= Utah State Route 39 =

State highway in Utah, United States

State Route 39
- 12th Street; Ogden River Scenic Byway

Route information
- Maintained by UDOT
- Length: 67.744 mi (109.023 km)
- Existed: 1911 as a state highway; 1927 as SR-39–present
- Restrictions: Closed in winter from mile 37 to 55.5

Major junctions
- West end: SR-134 near Marriott-Slaterville
- I-15 / I-84 in Marriott-Slaterville; US 89 in Ogden
- East end: SR-16 in Woodruff

Location
- Country: United States
- State: Utah

Highway system
- Utah State Highway System; Interstate; US; State; Minor; Scenic
← SR-38	→ US 40

State Route 39 (SR-39) is a state highway in northern Utah connecting Ogden to Woodruff via Ogden Canyon and Huntsville. The highway is locally designated as 12th Street in Ogden and the Ogden River Scenic Byway through Ogden Canyon. The route is 67.7 miles (109 km) long.

Prior to 1964, SR-39 was routed along 24th Street and Harrison Boulevard in Ogden. A change in the route moved the route north to 12th Street.

== Route description ==
The route begins heading east from the intersection at 4700 West (SR-134) as a two-lane highway in a relatively rural part of Weber County. By the junction of 1900 West (SR-126) in a more urban portion of the county, the route is widened to five lanes. The highway variates in direction after Monroe Boulevard, veering to the southeast. This portion of the route (specifically west of SR-203) is included in the National Highway System.

Once exiting Ogden, the route becomes more curved as it traverses Ogden Canyon on a two-lane road, still maintaining a general east-northeasterly direction. The Ogden River runs parallel to the highway during its tenure in Ogden Canyon. This portion of the route is named Ogden River Scenic Byway. As it enters the Ogden Valley, SR-158 splits off to the north, crossing Pineview Dam, while SR-39 continues to the east, along the southern edge of Pineview Reservoir. Right before entering Huntsville, the route turns north and becomes 7800 East. The route turns east and maintains an initial north-northeasterly direction before eventually turning northeast. It traverses scenic, remote areas of the Wasatch Range and this portion between Huntsville and Woodruff is closed during winter. The route terminates at Main Street (SR-16) in Woodruff.

== History ==
The road from Ogden to Huntsville was added to the state highway system in 1911, and in 1919 the state legislature extended it east to Randolph. The portion north from Woodruff to Randolph became part of a different highway (now SR-16) in 1921, and in 1927 the legislature defined the Ogden-Woodruff road as SR-39. The original alignment in Ogden followed 24th Street from US-91 (now US-89) east to Harrison Boulevard (SR-103, now SR-203), where it turned north and then east on Valley Drive to Ogden Canyon. State Route 205 was created in 1963, following 12th Street from SR-1 east to Harrison Boulevard, in exchange for giving SR-183A to the city. One year later, SR-39 was realigned to replace SR-205, continuing east on a new roadway from 12th Street and Harrison Boulevard to the canyon. The portion of SR-39 on Harrison Boulevard was renumbered as SR-203, which had ended at Valley Drive, and the portion on 24th Street became part of SR-37. In 1965, SR-39 was extended west to SR-84 (now SR-126), in order to form a direct connection between proposed I-15 and Ogden Canyon, and in 1969 it was extended farther to its present terminus at SR-40 (now SR-134).

== Major intersections ==
County	Location	mi	km	Destinations	Notes
Weber		0.000	0.000	SR-134 (4700 West)	Western terminus
Weber	Marriott-Slaterville	3.520	5.665	SR-126 (1900 West)	
Weber	Marriott-Slaterville	3.896– 4.098	6.270– 6.595	I-15 / I-84 – Salt Lake City, Cheyenne, Tremonton	
Weber	Ogden	5.965	9.600	SR-204 (Wall Avenue)	
Weber	Ogden	6.396	10.293	US 89 (Washington Boulevard)	
Weber	Ogden	7.713	12.413	SR-203 south (Harrison Boulevard)	
Weber		13.792	22.196	SR-158 north – Eden, Liberty	
Weber		17.492	28.151	SR-167 south – Snowbasin	
Cache	No major junctions				
Rich	Woodruff	67.744	109.023	SR-16 (Main Street) – Evanston, Randolph	Eastern terminus
1.000 mi = 1.609 km; 1.000 km = 0.621 mi
