= Utah State Route 158 =

State highway in Utah, United States

State Route 158
- SR-158 highlighted in red

Route information
- Maintained by UDOT
- Length: 11.691 mi (18.815 km)
- Existed: 1990 (south part as SR-162/163 in 1933)–present

Major junctions
- South end: SR-39 at Eden Junction
- North end: Parking lot at Powder Mountain Ski Resort

Location
- Country: United States
- State: Utah
- Counties: Weber

Highway system
- Utah State Highway System; Interstate; US; State; Minor; Scenic
← SR-157	→ SR-159

Utah State Route 158 is a state highway in the U.S. state of Utah. Spanning 11.6 miles (18.7 km), it connects Powder Mountain Ski Resort and the towns of Liberty and Eden with Utah State Route 39 in Ogden Canyon in Weber County. A portion of the road is designated as part of the Ogden River Scenic Byway.

== Route description ==
State Route 158 begins at Eden Junction, its intersection with SR-39 at the Pineview Dam which is at the top of Ogden Canyon. From this point, it travels north across the dam and follows the shore of Pineview Reservoir to the northeast, eventually turning to the north. As it continues north past the end of the reservoir, it passes the town of Eden and former SR-162 which connects to Liberty. Up to this point, the route is part of the Ogden River Scenic Byway. Continuing north, the route passes the Wolf Creek Golf Resort before entering the narrow, steep canyon on its climb to Powder Mountain. The road to Powder Mountain is one of the steepest state highways in Utah with an average grade of approximately 14% over 5 miles (8.0 km).

== History ==
The road from Eden Junction (SR-39 at Pineview Dam) north to Liberty was added to the state highway system in 1933 as a southern segment of State Route 163, and was transferred to State Route 162 in 1935. In 1955, SR-162 was extended north to the forest boundary, and truncated back to Liberty again in 1963. In 1965, SR-162 was extended north from Liberty to Avon, ending at the southern terminus of SR-163. In order to maintain continuity in the state highway system, SR-162 absorbed SR-163 the following year, resulting in SR-162 stretching from Eden Junction through Liberty to Hyrum.

In 1969, SR-162's northern end was moved back south to Liberty. In the process, the road from Liberty to Paradise was removed from the state highway system, and the road from Paradise to Hyrum was re-designated as part of State Route 165. As part of the same redesignation, the so-called "Eden Bypass", a short, 0.57 miles (0.92 km) road providing a shorter connection between SR-162 and the town of Eden was added to SR-162 as a spur/leg. Also in 1969, State Route 166 was added to the state highway system, designated as the road from SR-39 at Huntsville north and east around Pineview Reservoir to SR-162 in Eden (the northern end of SR-166 was the road bypassed by the south leg of SR-162). In 1975, the "Eden Bypass" section of SR-162 was split off and redesignated as State Route 89 and renumbered as State Route 169 two years later in the 1977 Utah state route renumbering, essentially swapping route numbers with former Utah State Route 169 which followed the alignment of US-89 between Salt Lake City and the north end of Bountiful.

These highways remained unchanged until 1990, when Utah Department of Transportation (UDOT) recommended the road from the intersection of SR-162 and SR-166 to the parking lot at Powder Mountain be added to the state highway system in exchange for deleting SR-166, SR-169, and part of SR-162. As a result, the portion of SR-162 north of the SR-162/SR-166 intersection was removed from the state highway system, along with all of SR-166 and SR-169, while the remainder of SR-162 was redesignated as State Route 158 along with the aforementioned road to Powder Mountain. The route has remained unchanged since.

== Major intersections ==
The entire route is in Weber County.

Location	mi	km	Destinations	Notes
Eden Junction	0.000	0.000	SR-39	Southern terminus
Eden	3.778	6.080	2200 North	Former SR-169 ("Eden bypass")
Eden	4.337	6.980	2500 West – Liberty	Former routing of SR-162 left, former terminus of SR-166 right
	11.691	18.815	Parking lot at Powder Mountain Ski Resort	Northern terminus
1.000 mi = 1.609 km; 1.000 km = 0.621 mi

== See also ==
- List of state highways in Utah
