= Utah State Route 203 =

Highway in Utah

State Route 203
- Harrison Boulevard

Route information
- Maintained by UDOT
- Length: 6.137 mi (9.877 km)
- Existed: 1941–present

Major junctions
- South end: US 89 in South Ogden
- North end: SR-39 in Ogden

Location
- Country: United States
- State: Utah

Highway system
- Utah State Highway System; Interstate; US; State; Minor; Scenic
← SR-202	→ SR-204

State Route 203 (SR-203) is a state highway in the U.S. state of Utah. Spanning 6.1 miles (9.8 km), it serves as a north–south principal arterial road through eastern Ogden, connecting US-89 (Washington Boulevard), Weber State University, and SR-39 (12th Street).

== Route description ==
State Route 203 begins in South Ogden at the intersection of Harrison Boulevard and Washington Boulevard (US-89. From there, it travels north via Harrison Boulevard through eastern Ogden, in the shadow of the Wasatch Range, passing Weber State University, Ogden High School, and the Ogden River before ending at 12th Street (SR-39) just below the mouth of Ogden Canyon.

The entire route is included in the National Highway System.

== History ==
Part of Harrison Boulevard was first added to the state highway system in 1911 as what would become Utah State Route 39. State Route 39 originally ran east up 24th Street to Harrison Boulevard, then north along Harrison, then turning east on Valley Drive up Ogden Canyon. Later, in 1935, Harrison Boulevard south of SR-39 was added to the state highway system as Utah State Route 103, running from Route 39 (24th Street at the time) south to Route 5 (modern US-89). Harrison Boulevard north from SR-39 at Valley Drive to 2nd street was added in 1941 as Route 203, designated as continuing north on Harrison, past the Utah State Tuberculosis Sanatorium to 2nd Street, then west to the Army Supply Depot. At this time, some 7.4 miles (11.9 km) of Harrison Boulevard, from 2nd Street in the north to Route 5 in the south, was in the state highway system, covered by three routes.

In 1953, the northern section of Harrison Boulevard was removed from SR-203, leaving that route entirely on 2nd Street. In 1964, SR-39 was realigned from Harrison and 24th to the new roadway constructed on 12th Street at the mouth of Ogden Canyon west to Washington Boulevard. At the same time, SR-203 was extended south along Harrison, re-adding the stretch between 2nd Street and Valley Drive, acquiring what had formerly been part of SR-39 between Valley Drive and 24th Street, and absorbing SR-103 in its entirety. As a result, SR-203 now ran from the Army Depot east along 2nd Street to Harrison, then south to the end of Harrison at present-day US-89, while SR-39 ran straight up 12th Street, and SR-103 was deleted from the state highway system until the route number was reused the following year.

In 1969, a number of minor state highways were deleted, and State Route 203 was not immune. The northmost 3.3 miles (5.3 km) of the route were removed, comprising the roadway from SR-39 north to 2nd Street and west to the Army Depot, leaving the north end of SR-203 at SR-39 (12th Street), where it still remains.

== Major intersections ==
The entire route is in Weber County.

Location	mi	km	Destinations	Notes
South Ogden	0.000	0.000	US 89 (Washington Boulevard)	Southern terminus
Ogden	2.420– 2.945	3.895– 4.740	SR-284	SR-284 is a loop around Weber State University with four outlets onto SR-203.
Ogden	3.920	6.309	SR-79 (30th Street)	
Ogden	4.787	7.704	24th Street	Former SR-39, SR-37
Ogden	6.137	9.877	SR-39 (12th Street)	Northern terminus
1.000 mi = 1.609 km; 1.000 km = 0.621 mi
