= Ogden Valley City, Utah =

Ogden Valley Ink-ah-we-in-da
- CCD
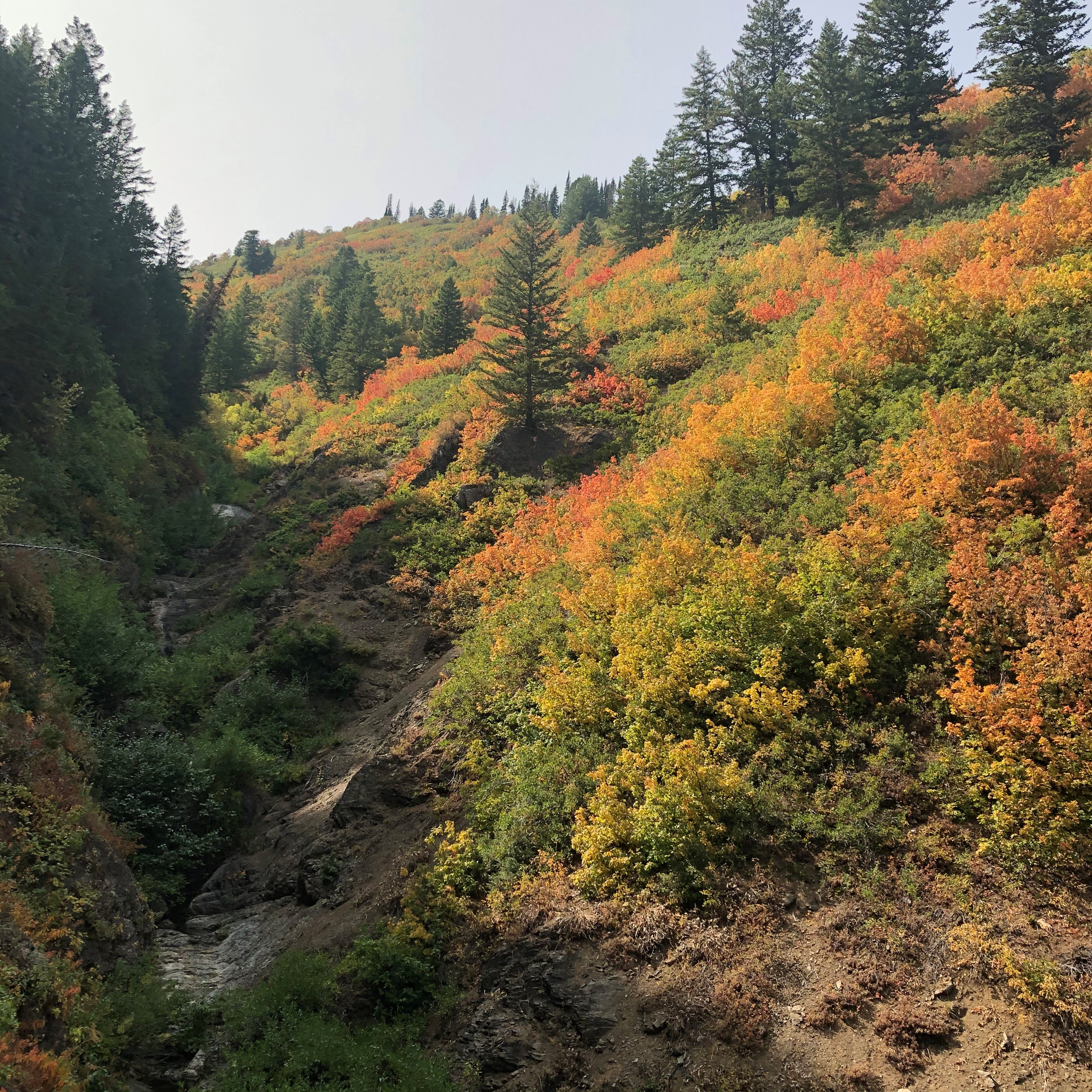
- Upper Cold Canyon in Ogden Valley, Utah
- Interactive map of Ogden Valley
- Coordinates: 41°20′33″N 111°51′54″W
- Country: United States
- State: Utah
- County: Weber
- Explored by the Hudson's Bay Company: May 16, 1825
- Named for: Peter Skene Ogden
- Elevation: 5,135 ft (1,565 m)

Population (2020)
  - Total: 7,855
- Time zone: UTC-7 (Mountain (MST))
  - Summer (DST): UTC-6 (MDT)
- ZIP code: 84310, 84317
- Area codes: 385, 801
- GNIS feature ID: 2584770

Ogden Valley (Shoshone: Ink-ah-we-in-da, “Red Pass Basin”) is a city, high mountain valley, and ski resort community in Weber County, Utah, United States. The population was 6,855 at the 2010 census. Planning in the valley is managed by a special county-level planning division, the Ogden Valley Planning Commission. The valley is a popular vacation and tourism destination with three ski resorts, Pineview Reservoir, Causey Reservoir, and national forest lands. Despite its name, the city of Ogden is not located in the Ogden Valley.

== History ==
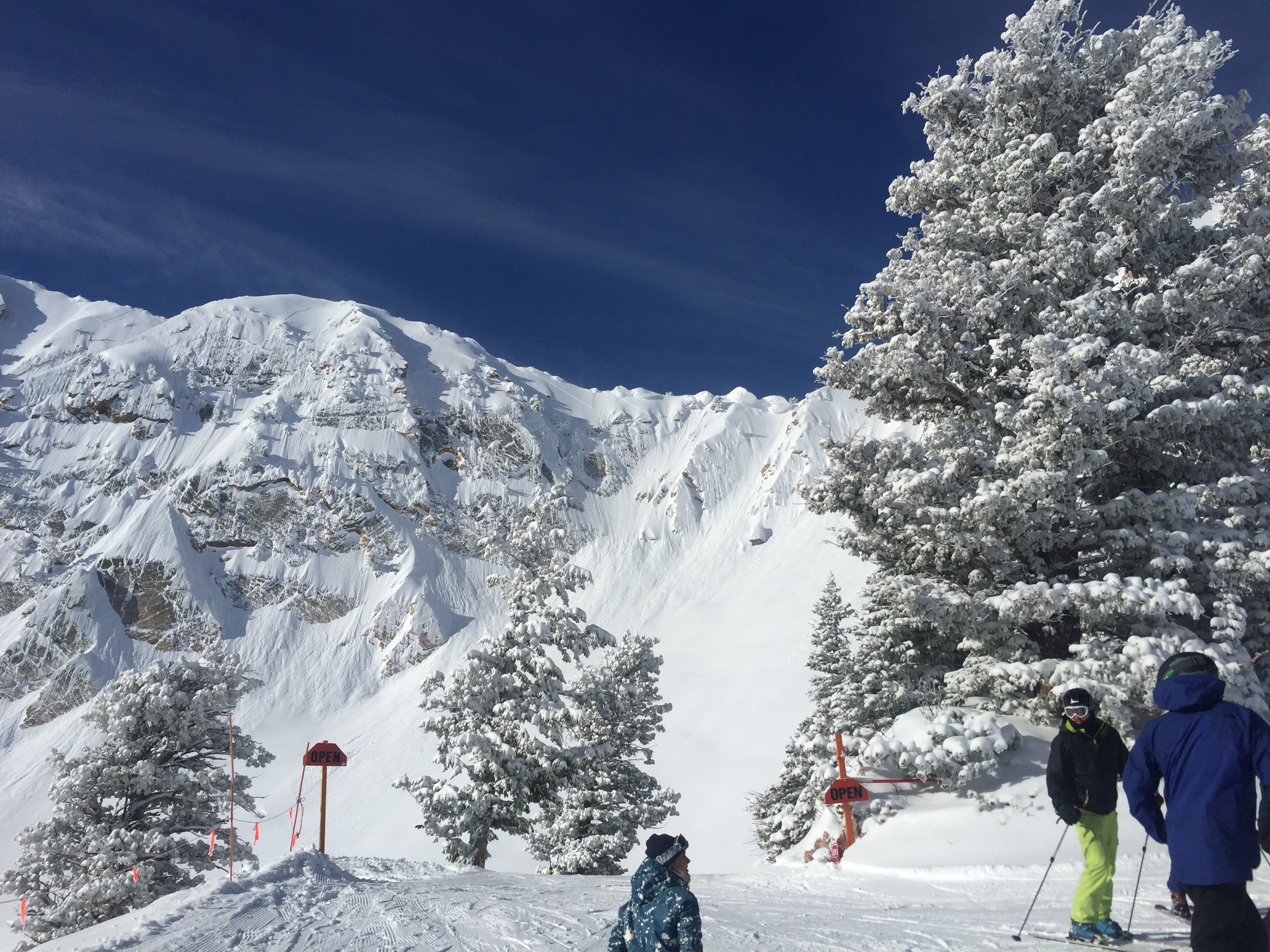
Snowbasin Ski Resort in 2019

Peter Skene Ogden entered the valley on May 16, 1825 with a band of trappers employed by the Hudson's Bay Company. William Kittson was in the group as well and drew a map of the area. They were trapping beaver as part of the company's campaign to eliminate all the furbearing animals between British-controlled territories and U.S. territory in order to keep American fur hunters from entering the Oregon Country. The HBC band left the Valley a few days later, but returned on May 25 after American trappers drove them away from Mountain Green at Deserter Point. In 1849 Captain Howard Stansbury of the U.S. Army explored the valley during an expedition to Northern Utah with Jim Bridger. Stansbury described the area as a "most lovely, broad, open valley" with its "numerous bright little streams of pure running water" a "scene...cheering in the highest degree".

In November 2024, a vote was held on whether to incorporate much of Ogden Valley as a new, independent city. There were 2,149 votes (67.94%) for and 1,014 (32.06%) against.

In November 2025, Janet Wampler won the city's first mayoral election.

== Geography ==
The Valley has three towns: Eden, Huntsville, and Liberty. Only Huntsville is incorporated as a town. Eden and Liberty are census-designated places. The Valley is centered around Pineview Reservoir, which is fed by the North, Middle and South forks of the Ogden River.

The Utah Geological Survey studied the water resources of the Valley and published their results in 2019.

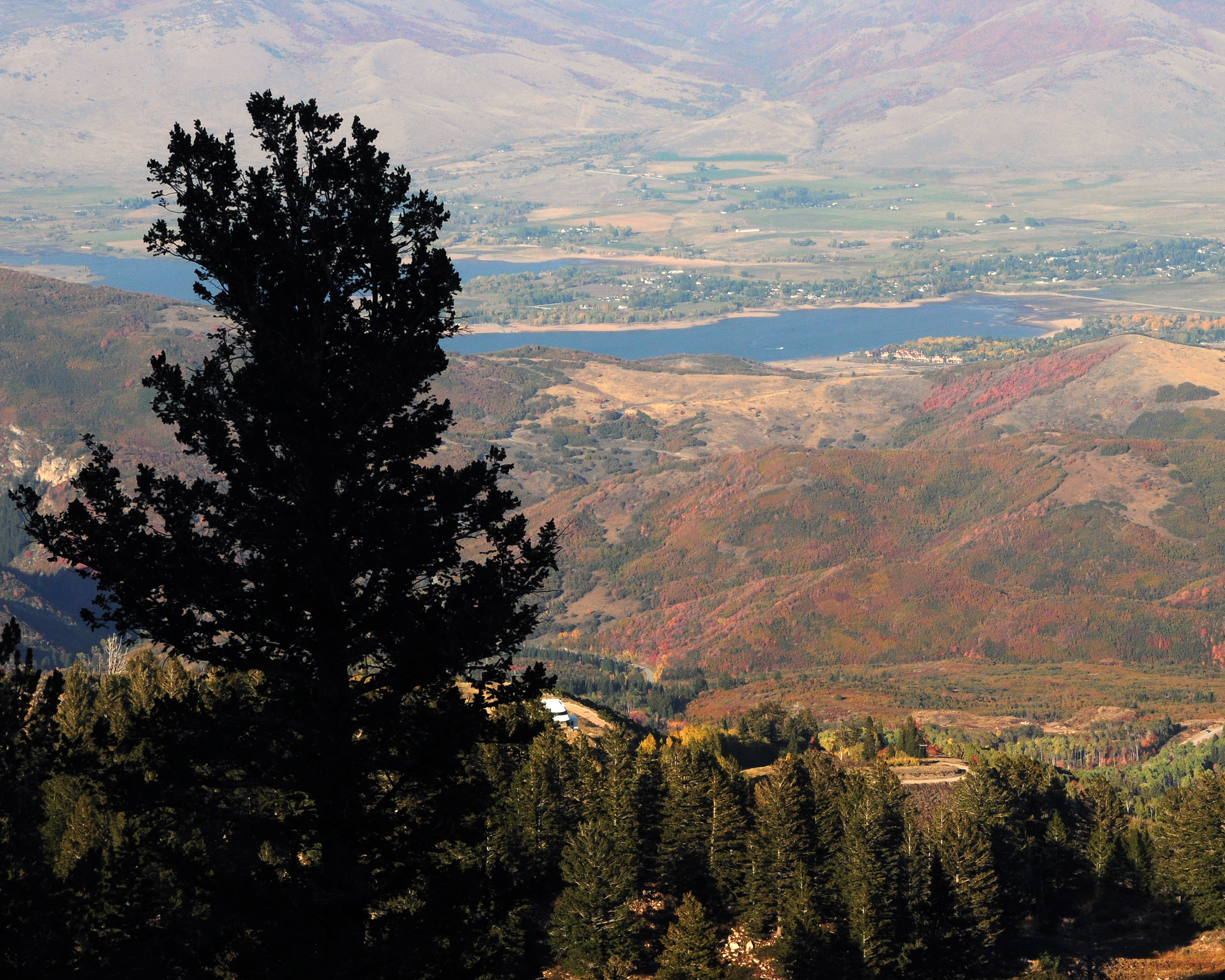
Looking down on Ogden Valley from Snowbasin Ski Resort

== Community ==
As of 2020, the Valley has eight churches, a grocery store, two post offices, three gas stations, an elementary school, and a junior high school. The county uses a master plan, published in 2016, as a guide for development.

Eden and Liberty share a post office. The Valley has one local newspaper, Ogden Valley News. Several nonprofit organizations serve Ogden Valley. The Ogden Valley Land Trust preserves open space through conservation easements. The Community Foundation of Ogden Valley distributes funds to charities and causes that help Ogden Valley's community interests. The Ogden Valley Emergency Response Team is a nonprofit emergency preparedness organization that "focuses on public education and awareness to help increase the emergency preparedness". Local businesses are represented by the Ogden Valley Business Association.

== Attractions ==
Three ski resorts are located in Ogden Valley: Snowbasin, Powder Mountain, and Nordic Valley. The Wasatch–Cache National Forest is found at all edges of the valley, with public access points throughout the area. Pineview Reservoir is located at the center of the valley.
