= West Haven, Utah =

City in Weber County, Utah, United States

- City
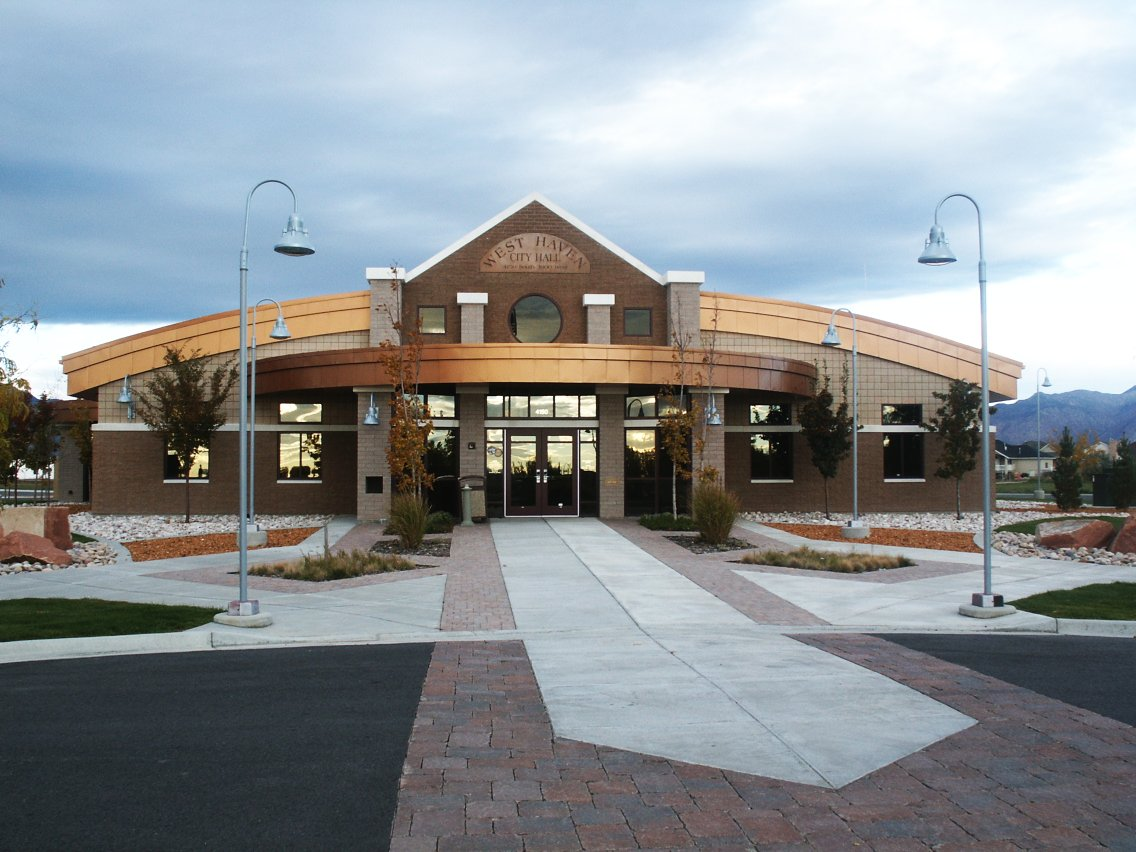
- West Haven city hall

- Location in Weber County and the state of Utah
- Coordinates: 41°13′20″N 112°01′40″W
- Country: United States
- State: Utah
- County: Weber
- Settled: 1854
- Incorporated: July 1, 1991

Area
  - Total: 10.64 sq mi (27.56 km^{2})
  - Land: 10.64 sq mi (27.55 km^{2})
  - Water: 0.0039 sq mi (0.01 km^{2})
- Elevation: 4,269 ft (1,301 m)

Population (2020)
  - Total: 16,739
  - Estimate (2023): 24,014
  - Density: 1,514.5/sq mi (584.77/km^{2})
- Time zone: UTC-7 (MST)
  - Summer (DST): UTC-6 (MDT)
- ZIP code: 84401
- Area codes: 385, 801
- FIPS code: 49-82930
- GNIS feature ID: 2412220
- Website: City of West Haven

West Haven is a city in Weber County, Utah, United States. The population was estimated at 24,014 as of 2023. It was incorporated on July 1, 1991, combining the unincorporated communities of Kanesville and Wilson.

West Haven is located approximately 35 miles (56 km) north of Salt Lake City, west of the Wasatch Mountains in northern Utah. The confluence of the Weber and Ogden Rivers is located inside the northeastern portion of the city. The city is bordered on the east by Ogden, on the south by Roy, on the west by Hooper, and on the north by Marriott-Slaterville. It is part of the Ogden-Clearfield metropolitan area.

West Haven has a city park which includes a historical monument. Plans provide for a River Parkway Trail that would include a fishing bridge, a pedestrian tunnel under 21st Street, picnic tables, places to rest and points of historical interest. Plans have this trail connect with the Weber County Centennial Trail. The current mayor is Rob Vanderwood who started his term on January 1, 2022.

== Geography ==
According to the United States Census Bureau, the city has a total area of 10.2 square miles (26.3 km^{2}), all land.

== History ==
=== Kanesville ===
The first settlers in what would become Kanesville arrived in 1868. At the time the area was known as Northwest Hooper. Kanesville was named for Thomas L. Kane. The name Kanesville was adopted when The Church of Jesus Christ of Latter-Day Saints first organized a ward there in 1882. The first bishop was Peter B. Peterson.

The name is retained by Kanesville School, a K-6 school in West Haven. Until October 2010 the Stake of The Church of Jesus Christ of Latter-day Saints in the city was the Kanesville Utah Stake. On October 17, 2010, the Kanesville Utah Stake was divided and a new stake, the West Haven Utah Stake, was formed. The old stake retained the Kanesville name.

=== Wilson ===
Wilson, Utah was formed in 1854. It was named after the four Wilson brothers who began farming in the area in 1854. An irrigation company was formed in 1879 and an LDS Ward was organized in 1882. The first bishop was Brigham Heber Bingham. The first settler to live in the area that became Wilson was John Martin. He moved from Ogden and was the first to move west of the Weber River in 1856. The Wilson Brothers started farming in the area west of the Weber River in 1854, but lived in Ogden. (History from the book, "Mormon John Martin" Utah Pioneer Family History copyright 1969 by Drucilla H. McFarland. Carr Printing.)

=== City of West Haven ===
West Haven installed a citywide sewer system in 2002. In 1994 the city purchased 40 acres for a park which was then developed with playground equipment and sports fields. There is also a historical marker in the park.

== Demographics ==
Historical population
Census	Pop.	Note	%±
1990	2,172		—
2000	3,976		83.1%
2010	10,272		158.4%
2020	16,739		63.0%
2023 (est.)	24,014		43.5%
U.S. Decennial Census

=== 2020 census ===
As of the 2020 census, West Haven had a population of 16,739 and a population density of 1,552.7 people per square mile (599.5/km^2). The population distribution by age was 5,078 (30.3%) under the age of 18, 10,209 (61.0%) from 18 to 64, and 1,452 (8.7%) who were at least 65 years old, with a median age of 30.2 years. There were 8,339 (49.82%) males and 8,400 (50.18%) females; for every 100 females there were 99.3 males and for every 100 females age 18 and over there were 97.7 males age 18 and over.

100.0% of residents lived in urban areas, while 0.0% lived in rural areas.

There were 5,442 households in West Haven, of which 44.5% had children under the age of 18 living in them. Of all households, 61.1% were married-couple households, 14.1% were households with a male householder and no spouse or partner present, and 17.9% were households with a female householder and no spouse or partner present. About 16.0% of all households were made up of individuals and 4.8% had someone living alone who was 65 years of age or older.

There were 5,733 housing units, of which 5.1% were vacant. The homeowner vacancy rate was 0.7% and the rental vacancy rate was 12.2%.

Racial composition as of the 2020 census
Race	Number	Percent
White	14,058	84.0%
Black or African American	182	1.1%
American Indian and Alaska Native	144	0.9%
Asian	290	1.7%
Native Hawaiian and Other Pacific Islander	49	0.3%
Some other race	742	4.4%
Two or more races	1,274	7.6%
Hispanic or Latino (of any race)	1,994	11.9%

According to the 2020 American Community Survey 5-year estimates, the median income for a West Haven household was $80,762 and the median family income was $88,309, with a per-capita income of $31,976. The median income for males that were full-time employees was $62,817 and for females $45,884. 4.9% of the population and 2.1% of families were below the poverty line.

In terms of educational attainment, out of the 8,316 people in West Haven 25 years or older, 222 (2.7%) had not completed high school, 2,503 (30.1%) had a high school diploma or equivalency, 2,922 (35.1%) had some college or associate degree, 2,160 (26.0%) had a bachelor's degree, and 509 (6.1%) had a graduate or professional degree.
