= Weber County Library System =

Public library system in northern Utah, United States

The Weber County Library System (WCLS) is a public library system in northern Utah, United States. The WCLS serves a population of approximately 213,000 Weber County residents, with interlocal agreements, extending access to 330,000 residents in surrounding counties. The WCLS consists of a main library in Ogden, and four branches located in Roy, North Ogden, Huntsville, and Washington Terrace.

== History ==
On January 22, 1864, the Legislative Assembly of the Territory of Utah created the first Ogden Library Board. Since there was no provision allowing local governments to levy a specific tax in support of a public library, local businessmen and citizens provided funding for Ogden's first library.

While the library service in Ogden City had its beginnings in the 1860s, it was not until 1903 that the Ogden Carnegie Free Library, the first public library building in Utah, opened. In 1968 the Weber County Main Library was dedicated, and the Carnegie Free Library's historical collection became a core resource of this new flagship of Utah's first county-wide system. This collection has since been systematically enhanced, facilities have been added, and programs have been created and honed to continually improve services to area residents. The WCLS has also evolved into a regional resource center, serving residents of six northern Utah counties.

The Weber County Library System also has an extensive periodical collection. This collection has a continuous run of titles from Pooles Index, and the indices that superseded it, from the mid-nineteenth century to the present. The facility houses an extensive collection of materials on local and state history, and an in-depth selection of fiction works by Utah and regional authors. The Main Library also maintains a non-circulating Special Collection that contains thousands of unique and mostly out-of-print titles on topics of importance to Utah and the West.

The WCLS serves a population of approximately 213,000 Weber County residents, with interlocal agreements, extending access to 330,000 residents in surrounding counties. The WCLS consists of a Main Library and a Public Law Library in Ogden, and four Branch libraries located in surrounding cities.

In 2013, Weber County voters approved a $45 million bond to renovate and upgrade the Ogden Valley Branch, Main Library, and North Branch while also constructing a new Southwest Branch that doubles as its headquarters. The Southwest Branch was completed in 2016 The final project of this bond was completed in the summer of 2018, with the completion of North Branch's renovation.

The library has approximately 100 staff members and an annual operating budget of just over $6,500,000. The WCLS is also supported by an active Friends of the Library organization and Development Foundation, which provides money for capital projects as well as more than 125 volunteers who work with the staff as literacy tutors, library specialists, and maintenance staff.

== Libraries in the system ==
=== Law Library ===
The Weber County Law Library is Utah's largest public law library north of Salt Lake City. The Law Library collection, which is almost entirely non-circulating, is primarily used for reference and research. Its holdings include state and federal appellate case reporters, legal encyclopedias, federal and state statutes, and a representative collection of major legal treatises. The Law Library has a unique historical collection of case law reporters that extend back to the 1880s, and also supports access to state-of-the-art online legal databases.

=== Ogden Branch Main Library ===
The Ogden Library houses the majority of the reference collection for the system and serves as a branch library for the communities that surround it. Its primary service areas are the cities of Ogden, South Ogden, Washington Terrace, and areas south to the county line, comprising approximately 92,000 people. After being closed for renovations since November 2016, the Main Library reopened on April 4, 2018, and was rededicated on April 7, 2018.

=== North Branch ===
The North Branch opened in 1983. It serves the communities in northern Weber County including North Ogden, Farr West, Plain City, Pleasant View, and Harrisville. The service area has a population of approximately 43,000 people. The majority of the areas served by the branch are suburban and rural residential, with a growing number of retail businesses. The library is located near the primary shopping area in the northern part of the county, and is next door to a senior center and the North Ogden City Hall. In April 2017, the North Branch closed in order to be renovated as well as to finish the 11,000-square-foot (1,000 m^{2}) basement, which served as the primary storage area for the Weber County Library System up until that point. The building was reopened the June 23, 2018.

=== Ogden Valley Branch ===
The Ogden Valley Branch opened in 1995 and serves the mostly unincorporated area located east of Ogden, as well as the towns of Huntsville, Eden, and Liberty. The year-round population is less than 5,000. The communities served are rural, including working farms and ranches, vacation homes, recreational businesses, and residential developments. The branch serves as a combination rural library and community center, with a large auditorium and adjoining community room.

=== Pleasant Valley Branch ===
This branch opened in April 2009. To meet the demand for library services in southern Weber County, the Pleasant Valley Branch was constructed in Washington Terrace and opened in April 2009. The building is home to the library system's main consumer health collection.

=== Southwest Branch/Headquarters Library ===
The Southwest Branch in Roy, opened in 1977 and serves the communities of Hooper, Roy, and West Haven, with a combined population of approximately 57,000. It is located in a heavily populated residential and commercial area, with a high school, junior high, and a number of elementary schools only a few blocks away. In 2013, Weber County approved a 45 million dollar bond to upgrade and expand the library system. As part of the bond, a new Southwest Branch building was constructed and opened its doors in February 2016. The new location includes administrative offices that were once located at the Ogden Main Library.

== Facts ==
- The Teen and Adult Summer Reading Program and Children's Summer Reading Program encourages people of all ages to read through the summer months, offering prizes for those who keep a reading log.
- America Reads is a free program that runs from June 3 - July 25, 2024 at all Weber County Library locations and is dedicated to helping school-aged children improve their reading and comprehension skills. Students attend a half hour reading session with a tutor, earning prizes for each session.
- The Southwest Branch features the Blackbox Theater, a large outdoor programming space, an Art Gallery, as well as a cafe.
- The Main, Southwest, and Ogden Valley branches offer Makerspaces where patrons can experiment and create with different resources. Some of the equipment includes: a laser engraver, embroidery machine, button maker, binding machine, PC software for editing.
- Weber County Library hosts an annual book sale. Proceeds from the sale go to support a variety of programs throughout the Weber County Library system such as Reading is FUNdamental, America Reads Challenge, and the Adult Proliteracy Literacy Tutoring Program.
