= Utah State Route 204 =

State highway in Utah, United States

State Route 204
- Wall Avenue
- SR-204 highlighted in red

Route information
- Maintained by UDOT
- Length: 5.419 mi (8.721 km)
- Existed: 1939–present

Major junctions
- South end: SR-26 in South Ogden
- North end: US 89 in Harrisville

Location
- Country: United States
- State: Utah

Highway system
- Utah State Highway System; Interstate; US; State; Minor; Scenic
← SR-203	→ SR-208

State Route 204 (SR-204), also known as Wall Avenue, is a state highway in the U.S. state of Utah. Spanning 5.4 miles (8.7 km), it serves as a north/south arterial road through the city of Ogden, from SR-26 (Riverdale Road) to US-89 just north of Ogden in Harrisville.

== Route description ==
State Route 204 begins just south of the Ogden-South Ogden border, at the intersection of Wall Avenue and Riverdale Road (SR-26). From there it travels north along Wall Avenue passing along the east edge of the Newgate Mall. As it travels north, it crosses the one-way pair of 31st and 30th streets (SR-79), one of several east-west arterials that provide access to Interstate 15 to the west. Continuing north, the route passes Union Station at the west end of Historic 25th Street. Just north of Union Station, Wall Avenue passes under the viaduct for 24th Street (SR-53), immediately followed by the Ogden Intermodal Hub on the west, which serves the FrontRunner commuter rail and Utah Transit Authority bus lines. At this point, the route also passes just one block west of Lindquist Field, the baseball stadium for the Ogden Raptors minor league baseball team. Continuing north, Wall Avenue crosses another one-way pair of streets, 21st and 20th streets (SR-104), followed by the Ogden River and 12th Street (SR-39), before ending just north of the city limits in Harrisville at Harrisville Road (US-89).

== History ==
In 1931, the Utah State Road Commission designated State Route 103 in the area of what would later become State Route 204. However, it is unclear whether this route followed the exact alignment of Route 204, based on the legislative descriptions of 1931 "From West Ogden northerly to junction with route 1 at North Ogden Hot Springs", and 1933 "From Ogden, at a point between Washington avenue and Wall avenue northerly to junction with Route 1 at North Ogden Hot Springs.". The route was deleted in 1935 and the route number was transferred to a section of Harrison Boulevard.

State Route 204 was first designated in 1939 as running from Utah Hot Springs (now the location of Hot Springs Junction southerly via a diagonal route and Wall Street to Route 1 on Riverdale Road (now SR-26). At the time, Route 1 ran from the hot springs southeast along what is now Pleasant View Drive through Pleasant View and North Ogden, then south along Washington Boulevard. In 1945, Route 1 in North Ogden was realigned to the south to follow the more southerly diagonal section of Route 204 (now US-89), truncating the latter to its current northern terminus where Wall Avenue ends at US-89, while the former alignment of Route 1 through Pleasant View was designated as State Route 235. The route has been unchanged since.

== Major intersections ==
The entire route is in Weber County.

Location	mi	km	Destinations	Notes
South Ogden	0.000	0.000	SR-26 (Riverdale Road)	Southern terminus
Ogden	1.074	1.728	SR-79 east (31st Street)	One-way pair
Ogden	1.217	1.959	SR-79 west (30th Street)	One-way pair
Ogden	2.076	3.341	SR-53 east (24th Street)	Interchange; no access to SR-53 west
Ogden	2.517	4.051	SR-104 east (21st Street)	One-way pair
Ogden	2.660	4.281	SR-104 west (20th Street)	One-way pair
Ogden	3.562	5.732	SR-39 (12th Street)	
Harrisville	5.419	8.721	US 89 (Harrisville Road)	Northern terminus
1.000 mi = 1.609 km; 1.000 km = 0.621 mi
