= Eden, Utah =

Eden
- CDP
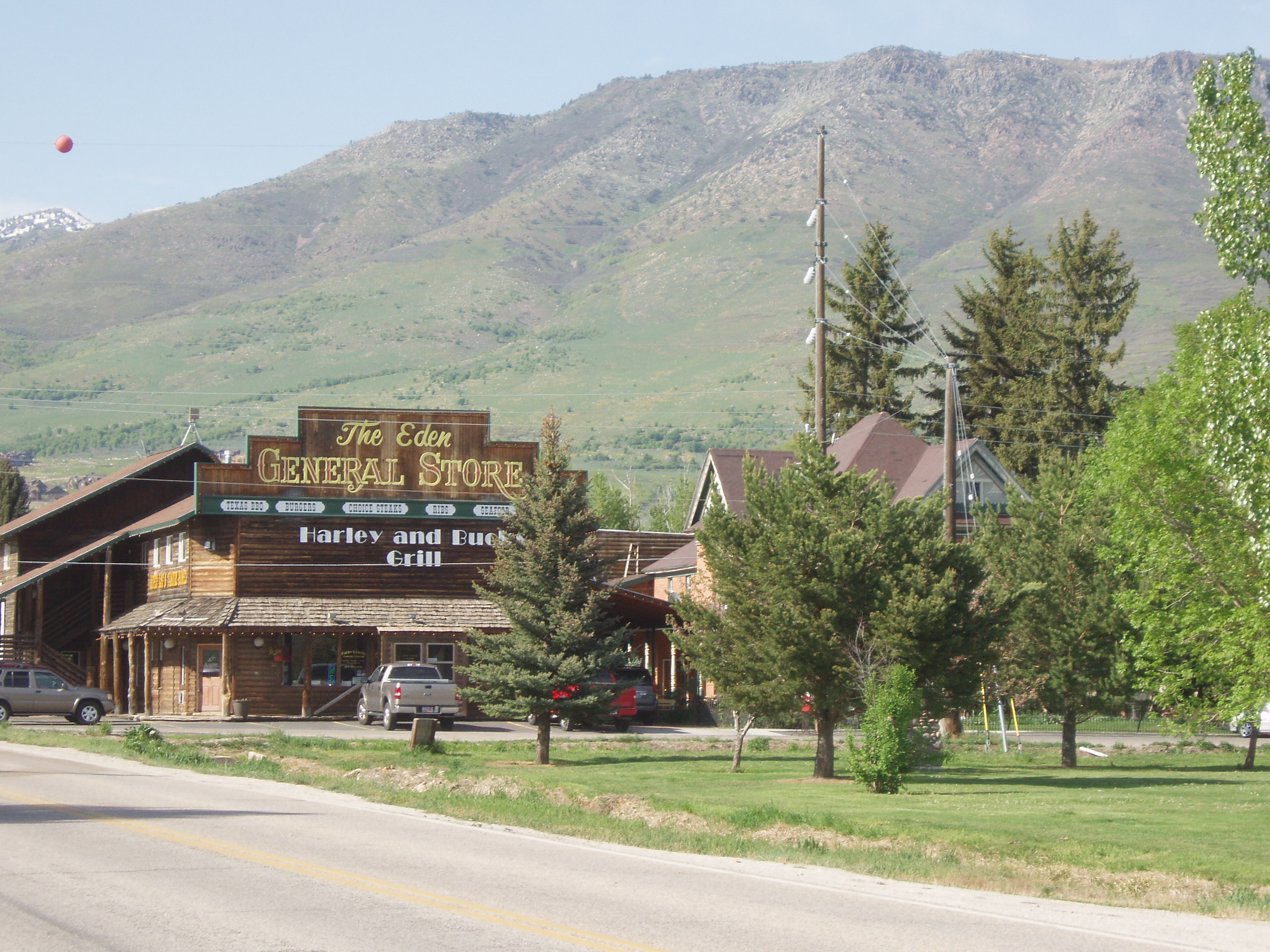

- Location in Weber County and the state of Utah
- Coordinates: 41°18′08″N 111°48′31″W
- Country: United States
- State: Utah
- County: Weber
- Elevation: 4,944 ft (1,507 m)

Population (2020)
  - Total: 690
- Time zone: UTC-7 (Mountain (MST))
  - Summer (DST): UTC-6 (MDT)
- ZIP codes: 84310
- Area codes: 385, 801
- GNIS feature ID: 2584764

Eden is a census-designated place in Weber County, Utah, United States. It is home to Powder Mountain ski resort. It lies between the North and Middle Fork of the Ogden River, north of Pineview Reservoir, in the Ogden Valley. The population was 690 at the 2020 census. It has a post office with the ZIP code 84310. Eden is part of the Ogden–Clearfield, Utah Metropolitan Statistical Area, as well as the Ogden Valley census county division

== History ==
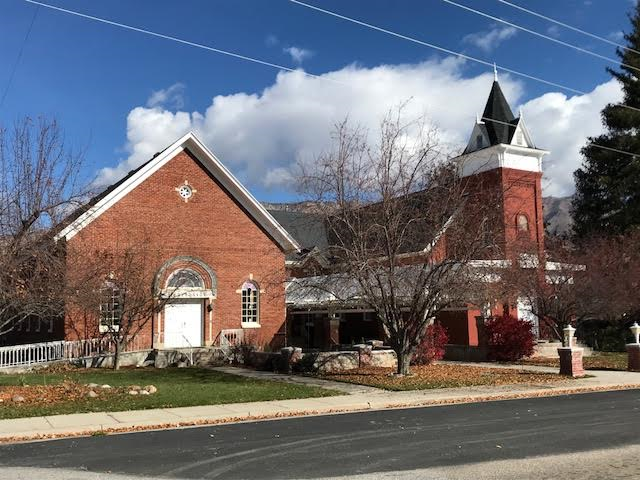
This historic 1896 pioneer chapel in Eden, Utah, is the oldest, continuously operating social venue in Ogden Valley, Utah. Pictured in November 2018.

The first home here was a log cabin built in 1857 for summer herdsmen Erastus Bingham and Joseph Hardy. A community was established in 1859 when fifteen families moved in via North Ogden Canyon and Pass. The settlers hired a government surveyor, Washington Jenkins, to plot the town. Jenkins said he thought the area was one of the most beautiful sites he had ever surveyed and suggested the biblical name "Eden". An earlier temporary name was North Fork Town.

== Climate ==
Climate data for Eden-Liberty, Utah, 1991–2020 normals, 2010–2020 snowfall: 5195ft (1583m)
Month	Jan	Feb	Mar	Apr	May	Jun	Jul	Aug	Sep	Oct	Nov	Dec	Year
Record high °F (°C)	54 (12)	59 (15)	73 (23)	78 (26)	89 (32)	95 (35)	98 (37)	98 (37)	95 (35)	83 (28)	72 (22)	57 (14)	98 (37)
Mean maximum °F (°C)	44.9 (7.2)	50.2 (10.1)	63.7 (17.6)	68.5 (20.3)	80.7 (27.1)	88.7 (31.5)	93.8 (34.3)	92.0 (33.3)	86.9 (30.5)	75.7 (24.3)	63.8 (17.7)	49.5 (9.7)	94.1 (34.5)
Mean daily maximum °F (°C)	33.0 (0.6)	37.4 (3.0)	48.7 (9.3)	56.2 (13.4)	66.4 (19.1)	77.3 (25.2)	87.2 (30.7)	85.8 (29.9)	75.9 (24.4)	62.8 (17.1)	46.9 (8.3)	34.4 (1.3)	59.3 (15.2)
Daily mean °F (°C)	24.1 (−4.4)	27.5 (−2.5)	37.4 (3.0)	44.4 (6.9)	52.6 (11.4)	61.3 (16.3)	69.6 (20.9)	68.5 (20.3)	59.0 (15.0)	47.6 (8.7)	35.8 (2.1)	25.3 (−3.7)	46.1 (7.8)
Mean daily minimum °F (°C)	15.2 (−9.3)	17.6 (−8.0)	26.0 (−3.3)	32.5 (0.3)	38.8 (3.8)	45.2 (7.3)	51.9 (11.1)	51.1 (10.6)	42.0 (5.6)	32.3 (0.2)	24.7 (−4.1)	16.1 (−8.8)	32.8 (0.5)
Mean minimum °F (°C)	−4.6 (−20.3)	1.9 (−16.7)	12.7 (−10.7)	21.2 (−6.0)	27.3 (−2.6)	36.3 (2.4)	43.7 (6.5)	42.2 (5.7)	32.5 (0.3)	18.8 (−7.3)	10.8 (−11.8)	−2.2 (−19.0)	−7.8 (−22.1)
Record low °F (°C)	−20 (−29)	−10 (−23)	7 (−14)	17 (−8)	22 (−6)	31 (−1)	37 (3)	37 (3)	28 (−2)	−4 (−20)	−2 (−19)	−9 (−23)	−20 (−29)
Average precipitation inches (mm)	3.40 (86)	2.76 (70)	2.64 (67)	2.79 (71)	2.75 (70)	1.89 (48)	0.90 (23)	0.97 (25)	1.70 (43)	2.95 (75)	2.49 (63)	2.96 (75)	28.2 (716)
Average snowfall inches (cm)	26.8 (68)	18.3 (46)	11.8 (30)	2.7 (6.9)	0.4 (1.0)	0.0 (0.0)	0.0 (0.0)	0.0 (0.0)	0.0 (0.0)	3.2 (8.1)	13.7 (35)	22.1 (56)	99 (251)
Source 1: NOAA
Source 2: XMACIS2 (snowfall, records and monthly max/mins)

== Demographics ==
Historical population
Census	Pop.	Note	%±
2010	600		—
2020	690		15.0%

As of the census of 2010, there were 600 people living in the CDP. There were 204 housing units. The racial makeup of the town was 95.8% White, 1.0% Black or African American, 0.2% American Indian and Alaska Native, 0.5% Asian, 0.3% Native Hawaiian and Other Pacific Islander, 1.0% some other race, and 1.2% from two or more races. Hispanic or Latino of any race were 3.2% of the population.

== Notable people ==
- Taylor Booth (born 2001) – soccer player and 2024 Olympian
- Zach Booth (born 2004) – soccer player
- David Eccles (1849–1912) – businessman and industrialist

== See also ==
- List of census-designated places in Utah
