= Lester Herrick =

American politician (1827–1892)

Lester J. Herrick
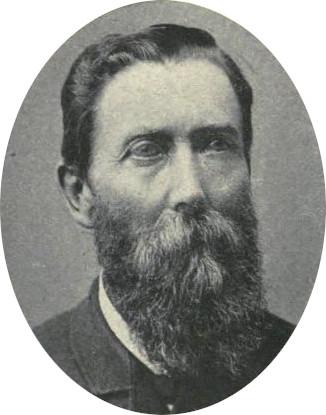
- Born: December 14, 1827
- Died: April 18, 1892 (aged 64)
- Known for: Mayor of Ogden, Utah

Lester James Herrick (14 December 1827 – 18 April 1892) was a Mormon missionary and politician. He was elected mayor of Ogden, Utah for seven two-year terms. He held the office in 1871, 1873, 1875, 1879, and 1881. He was a local businessman in the area and had earlier served as the Sheriff of Weber County, Utah, in 1860.
