= Pineview Dam =

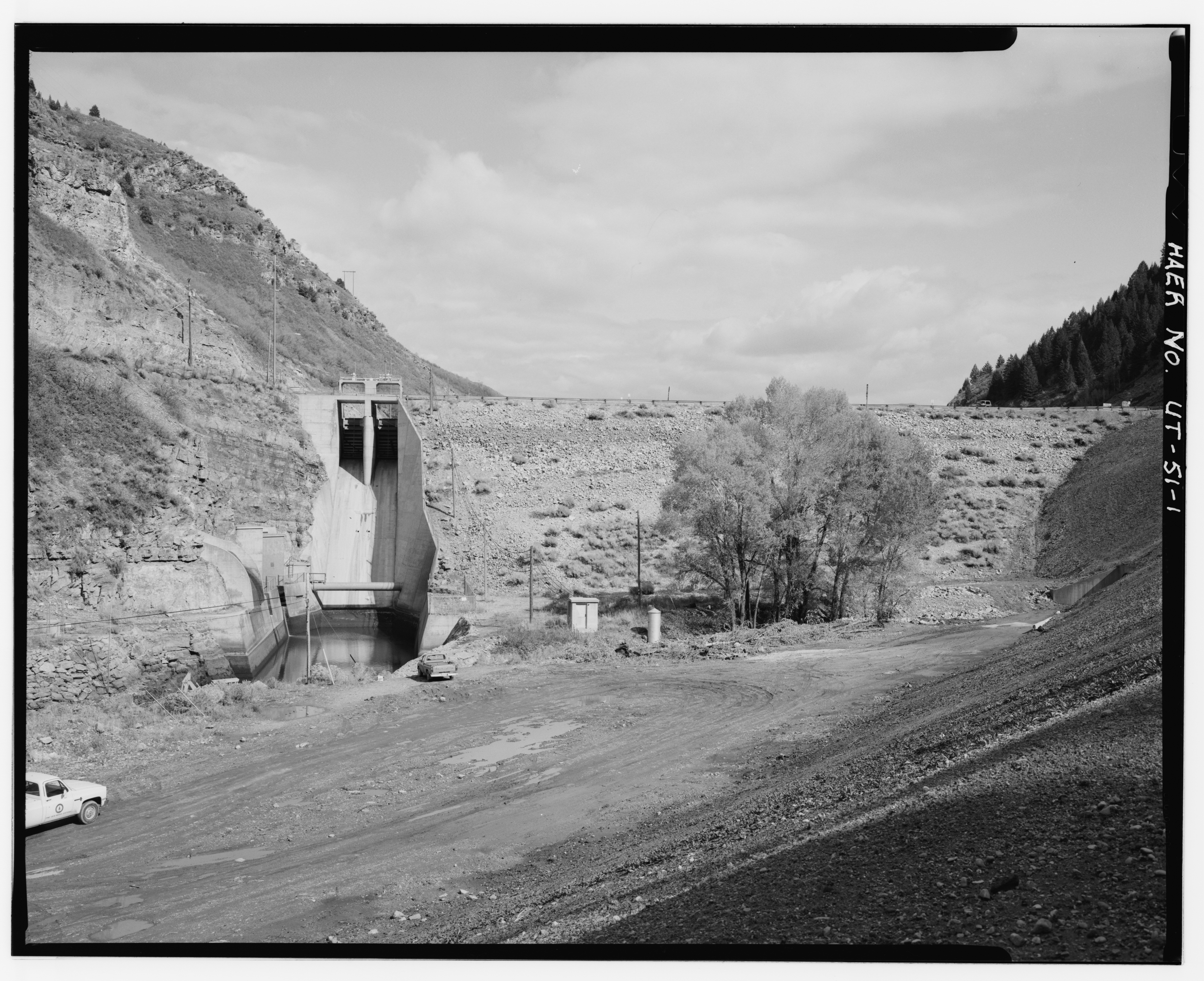
- Pineview Dam, 1987
- Interactive map of Pineview Dam
- Location: Weber County, Utah; United States
- Coordinates: 41.2544°N 111.8421°W
- Construction began: September 29, 1934

Dam and spillways
- Impounds: Ogden Canyon

Reservoir
- Creates: Pineview Reservoir

Pineview Dam is located in Ogden Canyon, 7 miles (11 km) east of Ogden, Utah, United States.

== Description ==
Pineview Dam is located at the eastern end of Ogden Canyon at the confluence of the north, south, and center forks of the Ogden River. The western half of present-day Huntsville is located between the central and southern bays of Pineview Reservoir. State Route 158 crosses the dam and runs adjacent on the north and west, former State Route 166 on the north and east, and State Route 39 on the southeast and south.

The dam was developed as a means of providing reliable irrigation to 25,000 acres (100 km^{2}) located between the Wasatch Range and the Great Salt Lake. It was built as part of the Ogden River Project, which included the Pineview Dam and Reservoir, Ogden Canyon Conduit, Ogden-Brigham Canal, South Ogden Highline Canal, and a gravity-pressure distribution located in the South Ogden Conservation District. Its shape is similar to that of an airliner or a bird.

== Climate ==
Climate data for Pineview Dam, Utah, 1991–2020 normals, 1940-2020 extremes: 4940ft (1506m)
Month	Jan	Feb	Mar	Apr	May	Jun	Jul	Aug	Sep	Oct	Nov	Dec	Year
Record high °F (°C)	60 (16)	63 (17)	74 (23)	83 (28)	91 (33)	100 (38)	100 (38)	99 (37)	102 (39)	86 (30)	74 (23)	61 (16)	102 (39)
Mean maximum °F (°C)	46.5 (8.1)	51.3 (10.7)	64.0 (17.8)	73.9 (23.3)	82.5 (28.1)	90.1 (32.3)	95.2 (35.1)	93.6 (34.2)	88.1 (31.2)	77.5 (25.3)	62.5 (16.9)	49.3 (9.6)	95.8 (35.4)
Mean daily maximum °F (°C)	31.7 (−0.2)	36.7 (2.6)	47.7 (8.7)	56.2 (13.4)	66.3 (19.1)	76.9 (24.9)	86.8 (30.4)	85.3 (29.6)	75.2 (24.0)	60.9 (16.1)	45.4 (7.4)	32.7 (0.4)	58.5 (14.7)
Daily mean °F (°C)	20.6 (−6.3)	24.9 (−3.9)	35.2 (1.8)	42.9 (6.1)	51.8 (11.0)	60.2 (15.7)	68.5 (20.3)	67.1 (19.5)	57.7 (14.3)	45.7 (7.6)	33.8 (1.0)	22.9 (−5.1)	44.3 (6.8)
Mean daily minimum °F (°C)	9.5 (−12.5)	13.2 (−10.4)	22.7 (−5.2)	29.7 (−1.3)	37.3 (2.9)	43.5 (6.4)	50.2 (10.1)	49.0 (9.4)	40.2 (4.6)	30.5 (−0.8)	22.1 (−5.5)	13.1 (−10.5)	30.1 (−1.1)
Mean minimum °F (°C)	−9.0 (−22.8)	−6.5 (−21.4)	6.3 (−14.3)	19.8 (−6.8)	27.0 (−2.8)	34.6 (1.4)	42.7 (5.9)	40.9 (4.9)	30.7 (−0.7)	19.3 (−7.1)	7.3 (−13.7)	−3.6 (−19.8)	−12.7 (−24.8)
Record low °F (°C)	−35 (−37)	−39 (−39)	−21 (−29)	3 (−16)	18 (−8)	26 (−3)	26 (−3)	30 (−1)	13 (−11)	1 (−17)	−17 (−27)	−36 (−38)	−39 (−39)
Average precipitation inches (mm)	4.13 (105)	3.16 (80)	3.33 (85)	3.20 (81)	3.09 (78)	1.83 (46)	0.66 (17)	1.02 (26)	1.66 (42)	2.68 (68)	2.64 (67)	3.24 (82)	30.64 (777)
Average snowfall inches (cm)	28.70 (72.9)	23.10 (58.7)	11.60 (29.5)	5.50 (14.0)	0.20 (0.51)	0.00 (0.00)	0.00 (0.00)	0.00 (0.00)	0.00 (0.00)	0.90 (2.3)	11.60 (29.5)	26.30 (66.8)	107.9 (274.21)
Source 1: NOAA
Source 2: XMACIS2 (records & monthly max/mins)

== History ==
The Ogden River irrigated approximately 3,000 acres (12 km^{2}) of land in the Ogden area before 1900. Increasing diversions led to a shortfall of irrigation flow during the late summer months. The Geological Survey 1921 established stream gauging stations along the river. A storage reservoir recommendation was made shortly after that by the Bureau of Reclamation, and investigations continued until 1932. The Pineview site was then adopted for a 30,000 acre-foot (37,000,000 m^{3}) reservoir.

President Roosevelt authorized the Ogden River Project on November 16, 1935. Fund allotment had begun in 1933 under the National Industrial Recovery Act. Construction began on September 29, 1934. Completion of the Pineview dam and Ogden-Brigham Canal occurred in June 1937. The South Ogden Highline Canal was constructed between 1938 and 1941.

Its construction is a zone earthfill dam type containing 15,500 cubic yards (11,900 m^{3}) of earth, rock and riprap materials. The crest of the dam is at 4,908.0 feet (1,496.0 m), is 30 feet (9.1 m) wide and 600 feet (180 m) long. Its initial height was 103 feet (31 m), resulting in a 44,175 acre-foot (54,489,000 m^{3}) capacity. The later Weber Basin Project increased the height of the dam to 137 feet (42 m), enlarging the capacity to 110,150 acre-feet (135,870,000 m^{3}). By using radial gates, the dam functions with an overflow, channel-type spillway allowing for a flow rate of 10,000 cubic feet per second (280 m^{3}/s).

The Ogden City Conduit is fed by a 72-by-75-inch (1.8 m × 1.9 m) conduit at 2,300 cubic feet per second (65 m^{3}/s). A stillout is fed from the same conduit through a 60-inch (1.5 m) outlet. A wye adapter on the 72-inch (1,800 mm) conduit allows additional discharge into the stillout, while 42-inch (1,100 mm) conduit feeds the Ogden City filtration plant located downstream. At 4.7 miles (7.6 km) down the Ogden River Canyon, the Ogden River Conduit splits into the Ogden-Brigham and South Ogden Highline canals. The Highline canal is fed through a 36-inch (0.91 m) diameter, 360 feet (110 m) long steel siphon suspended across the mouth of the canyon. The Ogden-Brigham canal has a flow rate of approximately 120 cubic feet per second (3.4 m^{3}/s), while the Highline canal flows at 35 cubic feet per second (0.99 m^{3}/s) over 5.2 miles (8.4 km).

== Benefits ==
At present capacity, the Pineview Reservoir is capable of irrigating 24,801 acres (100.37 km^{2}) of land. This greatly improved irrigation capacity and distribution, allowing for the growth of all manner of crops.

The reservoir also acts as a recreational area located very close to Ogden and the nearby areas. Camping, boating, water-skiing and personal watercraft use, as well as largemouth bass, smallmouth bass, crappie, sunfish, perch and tiger Muskellunge fishing are popular activities in the recreational area. Nearly one million people visited the area in 1996.

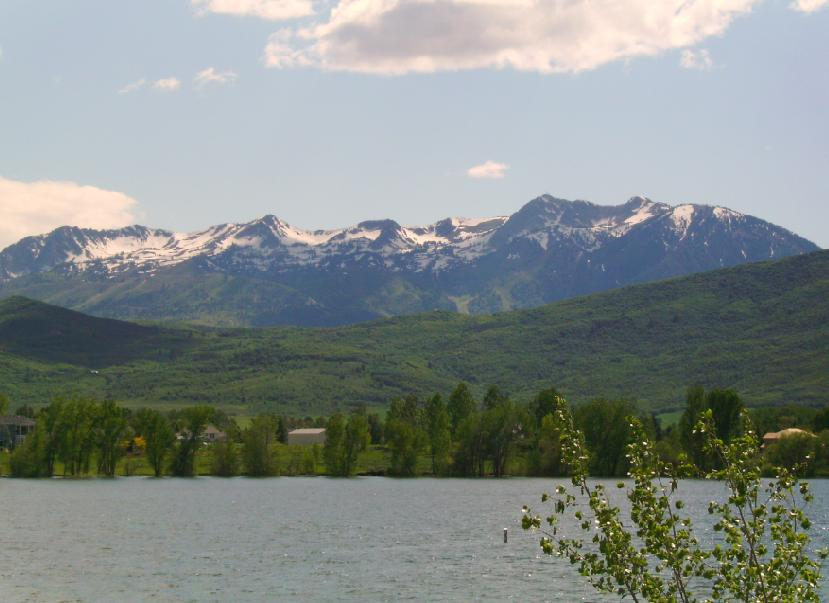
Mount Ogden with Pineview Reservoir in the foreground, June 2008

Flood control has been estimated at nearly ten million dollars between the years of 1950 and 1999. The capacity of the dam and its ability to discharge water at up to 1,600 cubic feet (45 m^{3}) per second into the Ogden River have proved beneficial during times of intense water accumulation.

Pineview also provides hydroelectric power to the grid via a 2,500 horsepower (1,900 kW), horizontal Francis turbine coupled to an 1,800 kW turbine. This project was completed in 1991, and diverts water from the 75-inch (1,900 mm) conduit, returning it after use. The operational capacity is rated between 130 and 300 cubic feet per second (3.7 and 8.5 m^{3}/s).

Pineview Reservoir is one of only three lakes in Utah that house the tiger muskie, a sterile hybrid fish. These fish have a torpedo shaped body, with vertical "tiger" striping on the sides. They also have many sharp canine like teeth. It is not uncommon for a tiger muskie to grow up to 3–4 feet (0.91–1.22 m) in length and weigh as much as 40 pounds (18 kg).
