= Weber County, Utah =

County in Utah, United States

- County
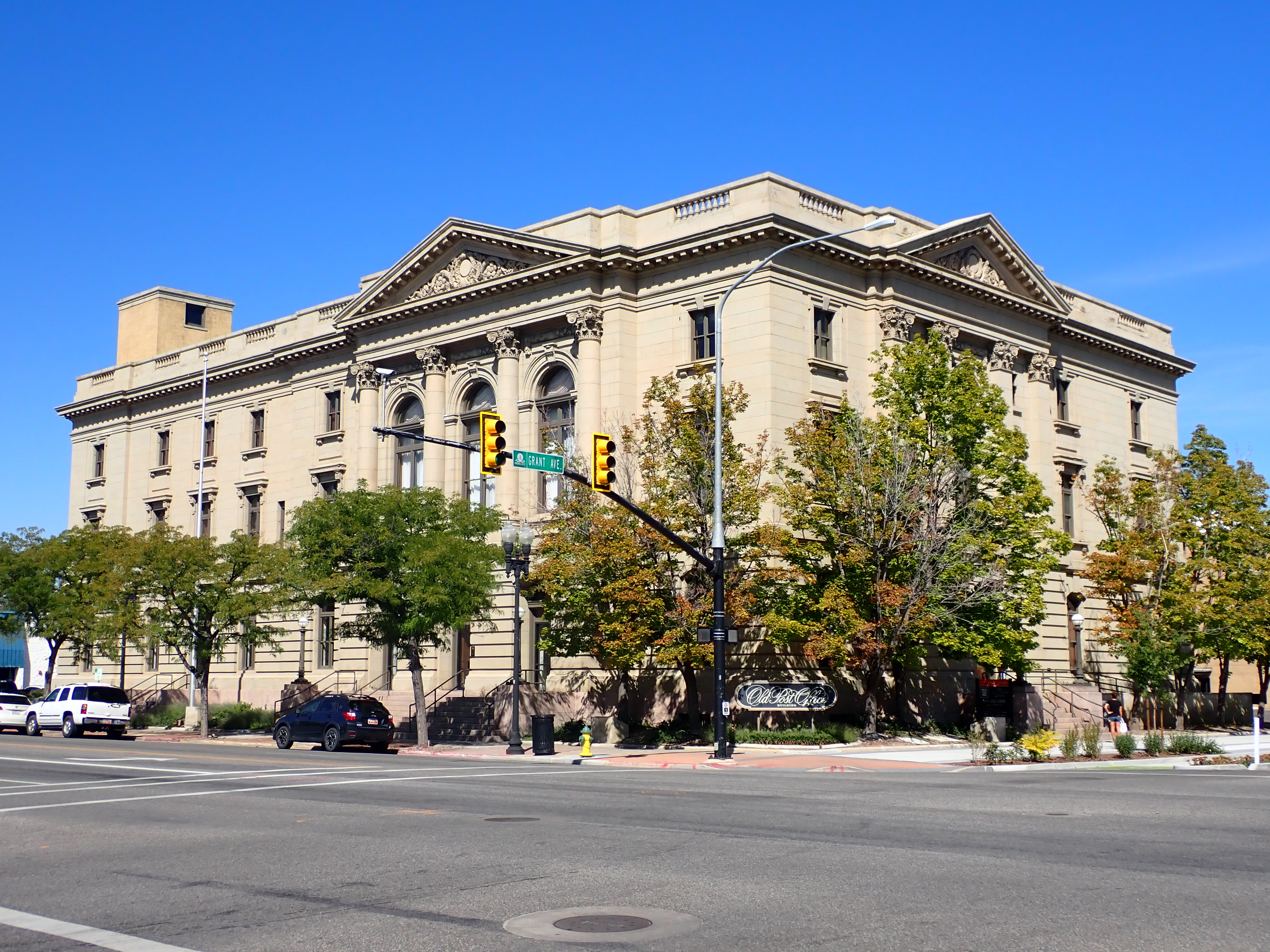
- Historic United States Post Office and Courthouse in Ogden, Utah.

- Location within the U.S. state of Utah
- Coordinates: 41°18′N 111°55′W
- Country: United States
- State: Utah
- Founded: January 31, 1850 (created); March 3, 1852 (organized)
- Named for: John Henry Weber
- Seat: Ogden
- Largest city: Ogden

Area
  - Total: 659 sq mi (1,710 km^{2})
  - Land: 576 sq mi (1,490 km^{2})
  - Water: 83 sq mi (210 km^{2}) 13%

Population (2020)
  - Total: 262,223
  - Estimate (2025): 278,174 ▲
  - Density: 472/sq mi (182/km^{2})
- Time zone: UTC−7 (Mountain)
  - Summer (DST): UTC−6 (MDT)
- Congressional district: 1st
- Website: www.webercountyutah.gov

Weber County (/ˈwiːbər/ WEE-bər) is a county in the U.S. state of Utah. As of the 2020 United States census, the population was 262,223, making it Utah's fourth-most populous county. Its county seat and largest city is Ogden, the home of Weber State University. The county was named after fur trapper John Henry Weber, an early explorer in the area.

Weber County is part of the Ogden-Clearfield metropolitan area as well as the Salt Lake City metropolitan area.

== History ==
The Weber Valley was visited by many trappers seeking beavers and muskrats along its streams. One of the first on record reached the area in 1824, traveling from Fort Bridger. He reported that the Bear River flowed into a salt bay. Peter Skene Ogden passed through in 1826, representing the Hudson's Bay Company. He traded in this area for several years, near present-day North Ogden. John C. Frémont explored the Weber Valley in 1843 and made maps of the area. The Fremont reports encouraged readers to seek their fortunes in the western frontier. Miles Goodyear was a fur trapper who constructed a way station on the Weber River in 1845. In 1847 he sold it to incoming Mormon pioneers. James Brown purchased and changed the site's name to Brownsville (later changed to Ogden).

After the Mormon pioneers began filling out into the future state of Utah, the fledgling government (as of 1849 known as State of Deseret) began a system of government. On January 31, 1850, the legislature provided for the creation of six counties to generally cover the area, named in this order:

- Weber (with Ogden as county seat)
- Great Salt Lake
- Utah
- San Pete
- Tuilla
- Little Salt Lake

The county boundaries were better defined by the 1852 Utah Territory legislature. The borders were adjusted by subsequent acts in 1855, 1856, and 1862. The creation of Nevada Territory in 1862 also administratively reduced the county's territory significantly since its 1852 description had it running to the Sierra Nevada mountains in central California. A final adjustment in 1880 concerning the various lands in the Great Salt Lake area brought the county's borders to their present configuration.

As of the 1852 description, the original Weber County stretched from California in the west, to the Oregon boundary on the north, to a point in the middle Davis County in the south. As Nevada and the State of Utah evolved, Weber County was trimmed so that it now occupies a stretch of the Wasatch Front, part of the eastern shores of Great Salt Lake, and much of the rugged Wasatch Mountains.

== Geography ==
The county extends from high in the Wasatch Range in the east into a portion of the Great Salt Lake to the west, where the county's elongated point exists. The Weber and Ogden rivers and their tributaries run through its valleys. The Weber County Surveyor's office divides the county into two regions, the "Lower Valley" and the "Upper Valley", divided by the ridge of the Wasatch front range south through the county. Lower Valley, adjacent to the Lake, is the county's more populous part. The Upper Valley consists mostly of the Ogden Valley, the watershed of the Ogden River. The county's highest elevation is Willard Peak in the Wasatch Mountains, at 9,763 ft (2,976 m) ASL. The county has an area of 659 square miles (1,710 km^{2}), of which 576 square miles (1,490 km^{2}) is land and 83 square miles (210 km^{2}) (13%) is water. It is the second-smallest county in Utah by land area and third-smallest by total area.

=== Major highways ===
Many roads in Weber County are named in a numerical grid system with a street name difference of 800 corresponding to one mile in a similar vein to Salt Lake County. In April 1947, North Ogden was the first municipality in Weber County to adopt the grid system, resulting in the north/south demarcator (1st Street) being placed in the northern half of the county. The east/west demarcator was selected as Wall Avenue which runs parallel to downtown Ogden.

- I-15
- I-84
- US 89
- SR-37
- SR-39
- SR-79
- SR-97
- SR-108
- SR-126
- SR-134
- SR-158
- SR-162
- SR-167
- SR-203
- SR-204

=== Adjacent counties ===
- Box Elder County - northwest
- Cache County - north
- Rich County - northeast
- Morgan County - southeast
- Davis County - south
- Tooele County - southwest

=== Protected areas ===
- Cache National Forest (part)
- Ogden Bay Waterfowl Management Area
- Weber Memorial Park
- Willard Bay Upland Game Management Area (part)

=== Lakes ===
- Beus Pond (aka Beus Reservoir)
- Bluebell Spring
- Box Spring
- Bybee Pond (aka Lybee Reservoir)
- Causey Reservoir
- Choke Spring
- Cold Springs
- Cutler Spring
- Deseret Spring (aka Desert Spring)
- Front Hollow Spring
- Glassman Pond
- Great Salt Lake (part)
- Green Pond
- Huntsville Reservoir
- Lime Kiln Spring
- Limestone Spring
- Little Monte Springs
- Lower Dry Bread Pond
- Meadow Creek Pond
- Monastery Spring
- Norma Springs
- Pineview Reservoir
- The Horseshoe Bend
- Twenty-First Street Pond
- Utaba Reservoir

== Demographics ==
Historical population
Census	Pop.	Note	%±
1850	1,186		—
1860	8,675		631.5%
1870	7,858		−9.4%
1880	12,344		57.1%
1890	22,723		84.1%
1900	25,239		11.1%
1910	35,179		39.4%
1920	43,663		24.1%
1930	52,172		19.5%
1940	56,714		8.7%
1950	83,319		46.9%
1960	110,744		32.9%
1970	126,278		14.0%
1980	144,616		14.5%
1990	158,330		9.5%
2000	196,533		24.1%
2010	231,236		17.7%
2020	262,223		13.4%
2025 (est.)	278,174	▲	6.1%
United States Census Bureau; 1790–1960 1900–1990; 1990–2000; 2010–2020, 2024

=== 2020 census ===
According to the 2020 United States census and 2020 American Community Survey, there were 262,223 people in Weber County with a population density of 429.1 people per square mile (165.7/km^{2}). Among non-Hispanic or Latino people, the racial makeup was 193,889 (73.9%) White, 3,209 (1.2%) African American, 1,394 (0.5%) Native American, 3,603 (1.4%) Asian, 948 (0.4%) Pacific Islander, 1,014 (0.4%) from other races, and 9,424 (3.6%) from two or more races. 48,742 (18.6%) people were Hispanic or Latino.

There were 131,864 (50.29%) males and 130,359 (49.71%) females, and the population distribution by age was 72,631 (27.7%) under the age of 18, 157,239 (60.0%) from 18 to 64, and 32,353 (12.3%) who were at least 65 years old. The median age was 32.9 years.

There were 89,595 households in Weber County with an average size of 2.93 of which 64,544 (72.0%) were families and 25,051 (28.0%) were non-families. Among all families, 48,636 (54.3%) were married couples, 5,660 (6.3%) were male householders with no spouse, and 10,248 (11.4%) were female householders with no spouse. Among all non-families, 19,876 (22.2%) were a single person living alone and 5,175 (5.8%) were two or more people living together. 33,909 (37.8%) of all households had children under the age of 18. 64,756 (72.3%) of households were owner-occupied while 24,839 (27.7%) were renter-occupied.

The median income for a Weber County household was $71,275 and the median family income was $80,961, with a per-capita income of $29,186. The median income for males that were full-time employees was $53,678 and for females $38,512. 8.6% of the population and 5.7% of families were below the poverty line.

In terms of education attainment, out of the 158,841 people in Weber County 25 years or older, 13,423 (8.5%) had not completed high school, 46,466 (29.3%) had a high school diploma or equivalency, 59,079 (37.2%) had some college or associate degree, 27,871 (17.5%) had a bachelor's degree, and 12,002 (7.6%) had a graduate or professional degree.

=== 2010 census ===
As of the 2010 United States census, there were 231,236 people in the county, organized into 78,784 households and 57,867 families. The population density was 351 people per square mile (136 people/km^{2}). There were 86,187 housing units at an average density of 131 units per square mile (51 units/km^{2}). The racial makeup of the county was 85.2% White, 1.4% Black or African American, 1.3% Asian, 0.8% Native American, 0.3% Pacific Islander, 6.59% from other races, and 3.0% from two or more races. 16.7% of the population were Hispanic or Latino of any race.

The median income for a household in the county was $62,036, and the median income for a family was $71,359. Males had a median income of $49,081 versus $34,954 for females. The per capita income for the county was $25,275. 12.1% of the population and 8.7% of families were below the poverty line. Out of the total population, 15.4% of those under 18 and 8.5% of those 65 and older lived below the poverty line. In the 2010 census, 67.0% of people over 16 were in labor, and 33.0% were not in labor. The unemployment rate was 3.2%.

=== Age distribution ===
Weber County Age Breakdown
Age Range	Number	Percent
Under 5 years	20,837	9.0
5 to 9 years	19,667	8.5
10 to 14 years	18,375	7.9
15 to 19 years	17,261	7.5
20 to 24 years	17,636	7.6
25 to 29 years	19,131	8.3
30 to 34 years	17,469	7.6
35 to 39 years	14,559	6.3
40 to 44 years	12,899	5.6
45 to 49 years	14,160	6.1
50 to 54 years	14,123	6.1
55 to 59 years	11,904	5.1
60 to 64 years	9,824	4.2
65 years and over	23,388	10.1

The median age was 30.7 years. For every 100 females, there were 100.7 males. For every 100 females aged 18 and over, there were 99.0 males.

=== Ancestry ===
As of 2017, the largest self-identified ancestry groups in Weber County, Utah were:

- English (21.6%)
- German (10.5%)
- "American" (7.5%)
- Irish (6.1%)
- Scottish (4.1%)
- Danish (3.9%)
- Italian (3.6%)
- Dutch (3.1%)
- Swedish (3.0%)
- Welsh (1.9%)
- Norwegian (1.9%)

== Politics and government ==
Like most of Utah, Weber County voters usually vote Republican. In no national election since 1964 has the county selected the Democratic Party candidate. Though Ogden has somewhat of a Democratic lean, the suburbs remain strongly Republican.

State elected offices
Position	District	Name	Affiliation	First elected
Senate	18	F. Ann Millner	Republican	2014
Senate	19	John D. Johnson	Republican	2020
Senate	20	D. Gregg Buxton	Republican	2016
House of Representatives	7	Ryan Wilcox	Republican	2020
House of Representatives	8	Steve Waldrip	Republican	2018
House of Representatives	9	Cal Musselman	Republican	2018
House of Representatives	10	Rosemary Lesser	Democrat	2021
House of Representatives	11	Kelly Miles	Republican	2016
House of Representatives	12	Mike Schultz	Republican	2014
House of Representatives	29	Matthew Gwynn	Republican	2020
Board of Education	1	Jennie Earl	Nonpartisan	2018
Board of Education	2	Scott Hansen	Nonpartisan	2018
Board of Education	4	Brent Strate	Republican	2020

United States presidential election results for Weber County, Utah
Year	Republican		Democratic		Third party(ies)	
Year	No.	%	No.	%	No.	%
1896	1,373	17.79%	6,343	82.21%	0	0.00%
1900	4,585	52.35%	4,092	46.72%	82	0.94%
1904	6,331	62.36%	3,108	30.61%	714	7.03%
1908	5,881	56.06%	3,965	37.80%	644	6.14%
1912	3,171	29.31%	2,986	27.60%	4,661	43.09%
1916	4,720	35.45%	8,139	61.14%	454	3.41%
1920	7,122	50.71%	5,239	37.30%	1,684	11.99%
1924	7,382	43.60%	3,970	23.45%	5,579	32.95%
1928	9,934	53.79%	8,361	45.27%	173	0.94%
1932	8,019	39.02%	11,541	56.16%	989	4.81%
1936	4,989	21.86%	17,594	77.08%	243	1.06%
1940	7,946	30.55%	18,037	69.35%	24	0.09%
1944	9,518	32.59%	19,639	67.25%	48	0.16%
1948	12,445	37.08%	20,861	62.16%	253	0.75%
1952	20,692	51.11%	19,795	48.89%	0	0.00%
1956	22,542	55.95%	17,747	44.05%	0	0.00%
1960	22,293	47.88%	24,239	52.06%	31	0.07%
1964	20,206	40.52%	29,666	59.48%	0	0.00%
1968	27,034	52.82%	20,465	39.98%	3,683	7.20%
1972	37,753	68.23%	14,503	26.21%	3,078	5.56%
1976	34,811	58.33%	23,111	38.72%	1,762	2.95%
1980	43,807	69.98%	15,404	24.61%	3,388	5.41%
1984	44,590	70.40%	18,346	28.97%	398	0.63%
1988	39,676	63.97%	21,431	34.56%	911	1.47%
1992	26,812	39.30%	17,795	26.09%	23,609	34.61%
1996	27,443	48.79%	21,404	38.06%	7,395	13.15%
2000	39,254	62.56%	19,890	31.70%	3,598	5.73%
2004	51,199	70.43%	19,862	27.32%	1,630	2.24%
2008	45,885	61.99%	25,666	34.67%	2,471	3.34%
2012	54,224	71.08%	19,841	26.01%	2,225	2.92%
2016	40,235	46.78%	23,131	26.89%	22,640	26.32%
2020	65,949	59.18%	40,695	36.52%	4,798	4.31%
2024	67,549	60.28%	41,238	36.80%	3,267	2.92%

== Education ==
Tertiary institutions and organizations of education in Weber County:

- Weber State University
- Ogden–Weber Technical College

The two K-12 school districts in the county are Ogden City School District and Weber School District.

There is also a state-operated school, Utah Schools for the Deaf and the Blind.

== Communities ==
=== Cities ===
- Farr West
- Harrisville
- Hooper
- Marriott-Slaterville
- North Ogden
- Ogden (county seat)
- Plain City
- Pleasant View
- Riverdale
- Roy
- South Ogden
- Uintah
- Washington Terrace
- West Haven

=== Towns ===
- Huntsville

=== Townships ===
- Reese
- Warren
- Weber
- West Weber

=== Census-designated places ===
- Eden
- Liberty
- Wolf Creek

=== Census county division ===
- Ogden Valley

=== Unincorporated communities ===
- Nordic Valley
- Taylor

== Notable residents ==
- Hal Ashby - film director
- Rodney Bagley - developed catalytic converter
- Gilbert Belnap - pioneer, sheriff of Weber County 1862-1870
- Solon Borglum - sculptor
- Fawn M. Brodie - historian
- John Browning - firearms manufacturer
- Bernard DeVoto - historian
- David Eccles - businessman
- Lester Herrick - pioneer, sheriff of Weber County in 1860
- Jefferson Hunt - founded Huntsville
- J. Willard Marriott - businessman
- Herbert B. Maw - Utah governor
- David O. McKay - ninth president of the Church of Jesus Christ of Latter-day Saints
- Olene S. Walker - Utah governor

== See also ==
- National Register of Historic Places listings in Weber County, Utah
- Weber County Library System
