= Ogden Canyon =

- Canyon
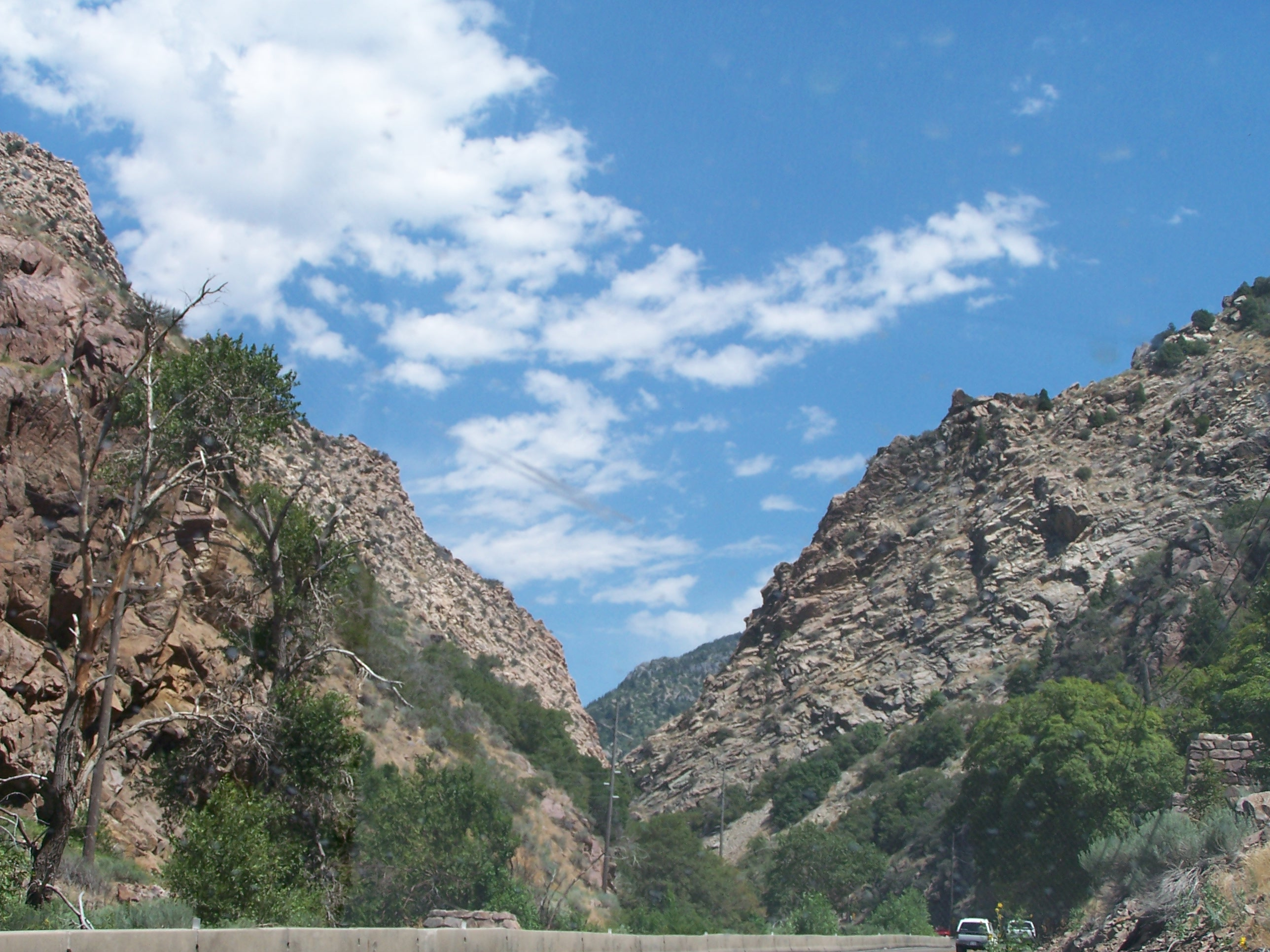
- Ogden Canyon, August 2005

- Location within Utah
- Coordinates: 41°15′15″N 111°52′30″W
- Location: Weber County, Utah
- Range: Wasatch Range

Dimensions
  - Length: 6 miles (9.7 km)

Ogden Canyon is a canyon in the Wasatch Range in eastern Weber County, Utah, United States, just east of Ogden.

== Geography ==
Ogden Canyon is a roughly 6 miles (9.7 km) long canyon with a series of smaller side canyons in the Wasatch Range. It was carved by the 35 miles (56 km) long Ogden River. The city of Ogden is at the western end of the canyon, and Pineview Dam is on the eastern end.

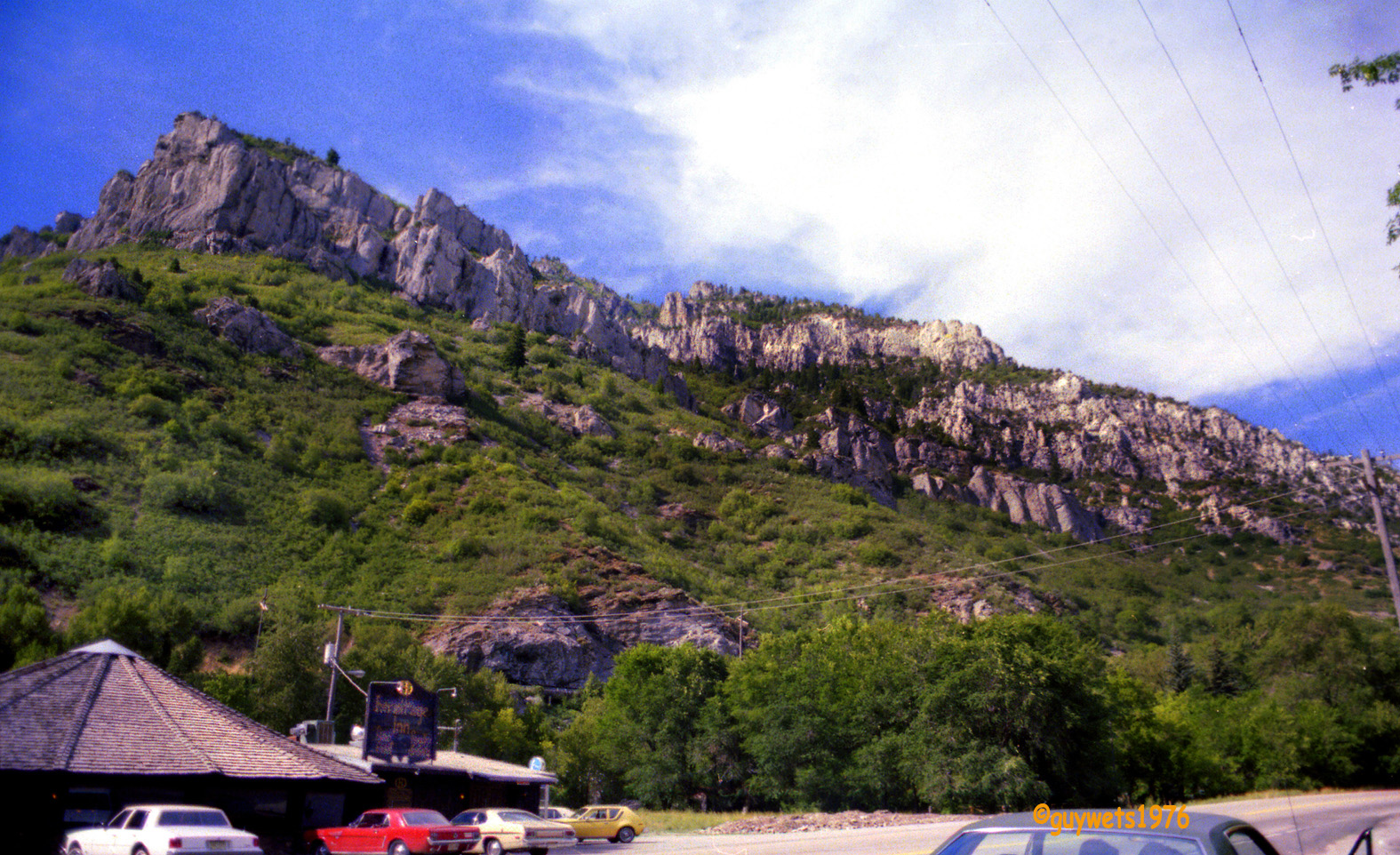
Hermitage Inn 1976

== History ==
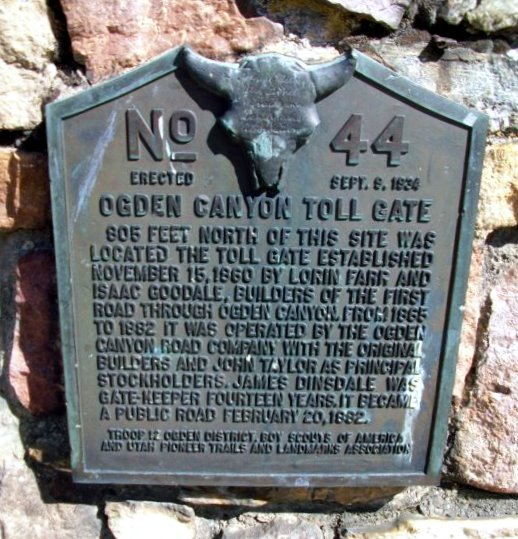
Toll gate monument plaque

Ogden Canyon is named for the Ogden River, which was named for Peter Skene Ogden, a 19th-century Canadian fur trader and explorer.

=== Toll gate ===
The first road through Ogden Canyon was built by Lorin Farr and Isaac Goodale. A toll gate was established in 1860, and from 1865 to 1882 was operated by the Ogden Canyon Road Company. It became a public road in 1882.

=== Lime kiln ===
A lime kiln was built in Ogden Canyon in 1865 to provide lime mortar for pioneer construction. Restoration of this kiln was completed in 2008.

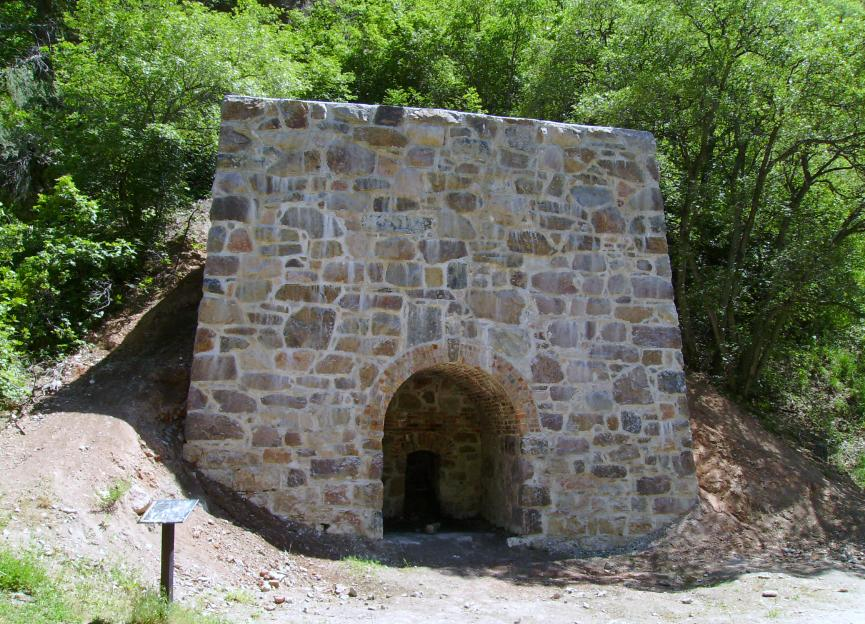
Restored lime kiln in Ogden Canyon, June 2009

== Ogden Canyon today ==
Ogden Canyon is home to several businesses and homes.

The Ogden River Scenic Byway (Utah State Route 39) begins at the mouth of Ogden Canyon.

=== Ogden marathon ===
The Ogden marathon goes through Ogden Canyon. It has been an annual event in Ogden since 2001.

== See also ==
- List of canyons and gorges in Utah
