= Marriott-Slaterville, Utah =

City in Utah, United States

- City
- Location in Weber County and the state of Utah
- Coordinates: 41°15′20″N 112°01′16″W
- Country: United States
- State: Utah
- County: Weber
- Settled: 1850s
- Incorporated: July 1999
- Named for: John Marriott and Richard Slater

Area
  - Total: 7.37 sq mi (19.10 km^{2})
  - Land: 7.21 sq mi (18.68 km^{2})
  - Water: 0.16 sq mi (0.42 km^{2})
- Elevation: 4,239 ft (1,292 m)

Population (2020)
  - Total: 2,135
  - Density: 263.1/sq mi (101.59/km^{2})
- Time zone: UTC-7 (Mountain (MST))
  - Summer (DST): UTC-6 (MDT)
- FIPS code: 49-48300
- GNIS feature ID: 2411040
- Website: www.marriott-slaterville.org

Marriott-Slaterville (also known as MSC) is a city in Weber County, Utah, United States. The population was 2,135 at the 2020 census. It is part of the Ogden–Clearfield, Utah Metropolitan Statistical Area. The city was incorporated in July 1999, in a merger of the previously unincorporated communities of Marriott and Slaterville.

== Geography ==
According to the United States Census Bureau, the city has a total area of 7.5 square miles (19.3 km^{2}), of which 7.3 square miles (19 km^{2}) is land and 0.2 square miles (0.52 km^{2}) (2.68%) is water.

== History ==
Marriott-Slaterville City was originally settled by several Latter Day Saint pioneer families, in 1852, including the Richard Slater family, and the Perry, Smout, Marriott, and Field families. Many living descendants of these families, including relatives of J. Willard Marriott, pioneer hotelier of the 20th century and founder of Marriott International, still reside within Marriott-Slaterville.

== Demographics ==
Historical population
Census	Pop.	Note	%±
2000	1,425		—
2010	1,701		19.4%
2020	2,135		25.5%
2023 (est.)	2,223		4.1%
U.S. Decennial Census

=== 2020 census ===
As of the 2020 census, Marriott-Slaterville had a population of 2,135. The median age was 36.5 years; 26.9% of residents were under the age of 18 and 15.1% were 65 years of age or older. For every 100 females there were 106.3 males, and for every 100 females age 18 and over there were 104.6 males age 18 and over.

76.3% of residents lived in urban areas, while 23.7% lived in rural areas.

There were 703 households in Marriott-Slaterville, of which 38.4% had children under the age of 18 living in them. Of all households, 60.2% were married-couple households, 17.6% were households with a male householder and no spouse or partner present, and 17.8% were households with a female householder and no spouse or partner present. About 15.8% of all households were made up of individuals and 8.1% had someone living alone who was 65 years of age or older.

There were 725 housing units, of which 3.0% were vacant. The homeowner vacancy rate was 0.0% and the rental vacancy rate was 3.8%.

Racial composition as of the 2020 census
Race	Number	Percent
White	1,798	84.2%
Black or African American	26	1.2%
American Indian and Alaska Native	24	1.1%
Asian	24	1.1%
Native Hawaiian and Other Pacific Islander	10	0.5%
Some other race	113	5.3%
Two or more races	140	6.6%
Hispanic or Latino (of any race)	271	12.7%

=== 2000 census ===
As of the 2000 census, there were 1,425 people, 458 households, and 381 families residing in the city. The population density was 196.4 people per square mile (75.8/km^{2}). There were 471 housing units at an average density of 64.9 per square mile (25.0/km^{2}). The racial makeup of the city was 96.14% White, 0.21% Native American, 0.49% Asian, 0.07% Pacific Islander, 2.11% from other races, and 0.98% from two or more races. Hispanic or Latino of any race were 3.37% of the population.

There were 458 households, out of which 38.4% had children under the age of 18 living with them, 70.1% were married couples living together, 7.9% had a female householder with no husband present, and 16.6% were non-families. 14.2% of all households were made up of individuals, and 6.3% had someone living alone who was 65 years of age or older. The average household size was 3.11 and the average family size was 3.43.

In the city, the population was spread out, with 29.4% under the age of 18, 10.7% from 18 to 24, 25.9% from 25 to 44, 23.1% from 45 to 64, and 10.9% who were 65 years of age or older. The median age was 34 years. For every 100 females, there were 102.1 males. For every 100 females age 18 and over, there were 105.7 males.

The median income for a household in the city was $49,732, and the median income for a family was $57,083. Males had a median income of $41,466 versus $27,788 for females. The per capita income for the city was $19,534. About 5.9% of families and 7.3% of the population were below the poverty line, including 6.4% of those under age 18 and 8.5% of those age 65 or over.

== Federal Representation ==
Marriott-Slaterville is located in Utah's First Congressional District For the 116th United States Congress, Utah's First Congressional District is represented by Blake Moore.

== See also ==
- List of cities and towns in Utah
