= Ogden River =

River in Weber County, Utah, United States

Coordinates: 41°14′05″N 112°00′09″W

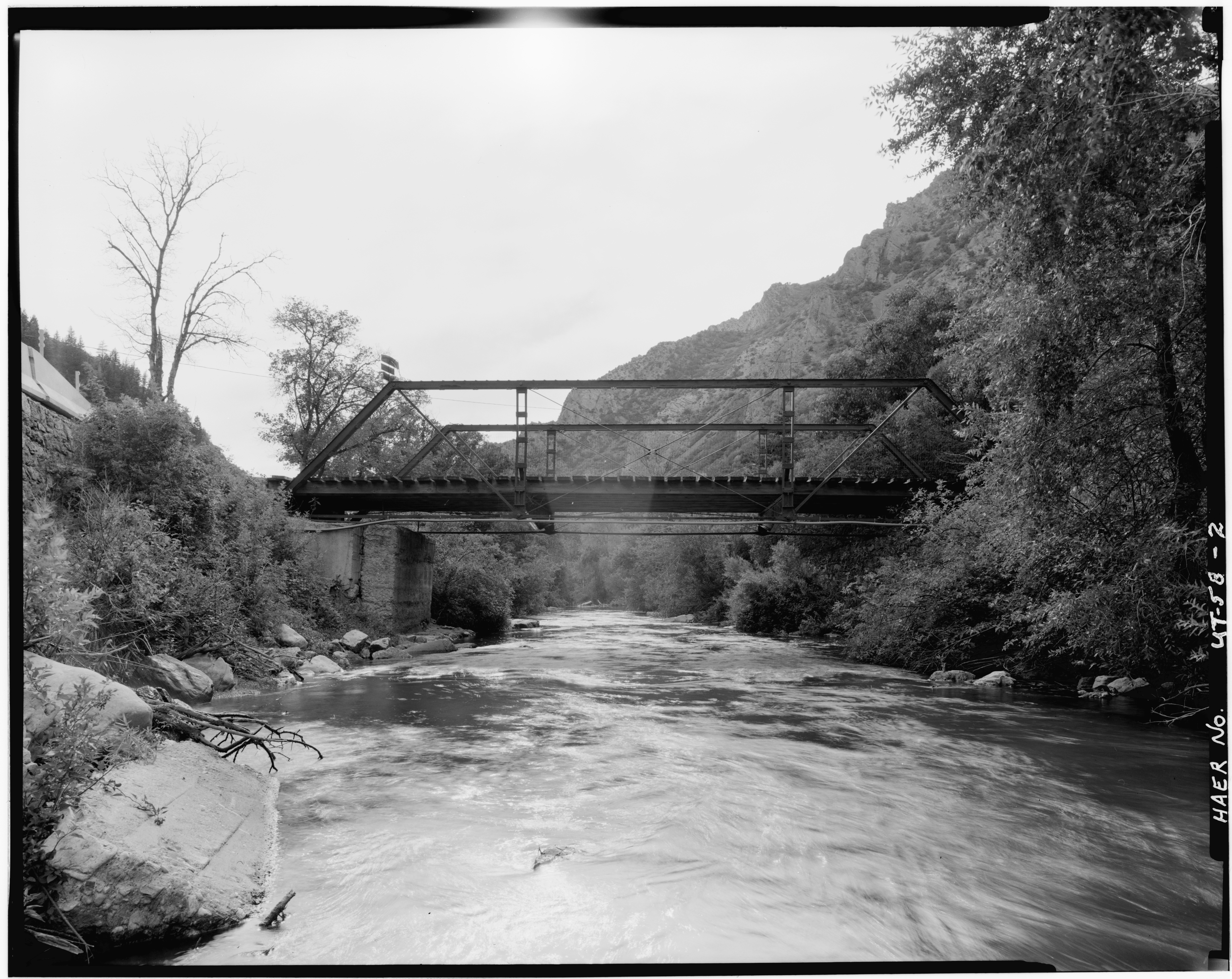
East at the Fairmont Bridge over the Ogden River in Ogden Canyon

The Ogden River is a 35-mile (56 km) long river in Weber County. Utah, United States.

== Description ==
The Ogden River's three forks (North, Middle, and South) begin in the Wasatch Range in Weber County and converge at Pineview Reservoir, near Huntsville. The river then flows southwest through Ogden Canyon, the city of Ogden, and the border of West Haven and Marriott-Slaterville where it joins the Weber River.

The Ogden River is older than the Wasatch Mountains. As the mountains slowly rose over the last 15 million years by periodic faulting on the Wasatch fault, the river was able to cut through the landscape to create the remarkable Ogden Canyon, which is a roughly 6-mile (9.7 km) long canyon with a series of smaller side canyons. The city of Ogden is at the western end of Ogden Canyon, with the eastern end at Pineview Dam.

Originally named after 19th-century fur trader Peter Skene Ogden, the Ogden River has been a source of irrigation since the early 20th century. Pineview Dam was completed in 1937 as one of a series of projects by the Bureau of Reclamation as part of the Ogden River Project. This project attempts to supply irrigation to 25,000 acres (100 km^{2}) of nearby land. Other related projects include the Ogden-Brigham Canal, which connects the river with Brigham City to the north, the reconstructed Ogden Canyon Conduit, and the South Ogden Highline Canal.

== See also ==
- List of rivers of Utah
