= Huntsville, Utah =

Town in the state of Utah, United States

- Town
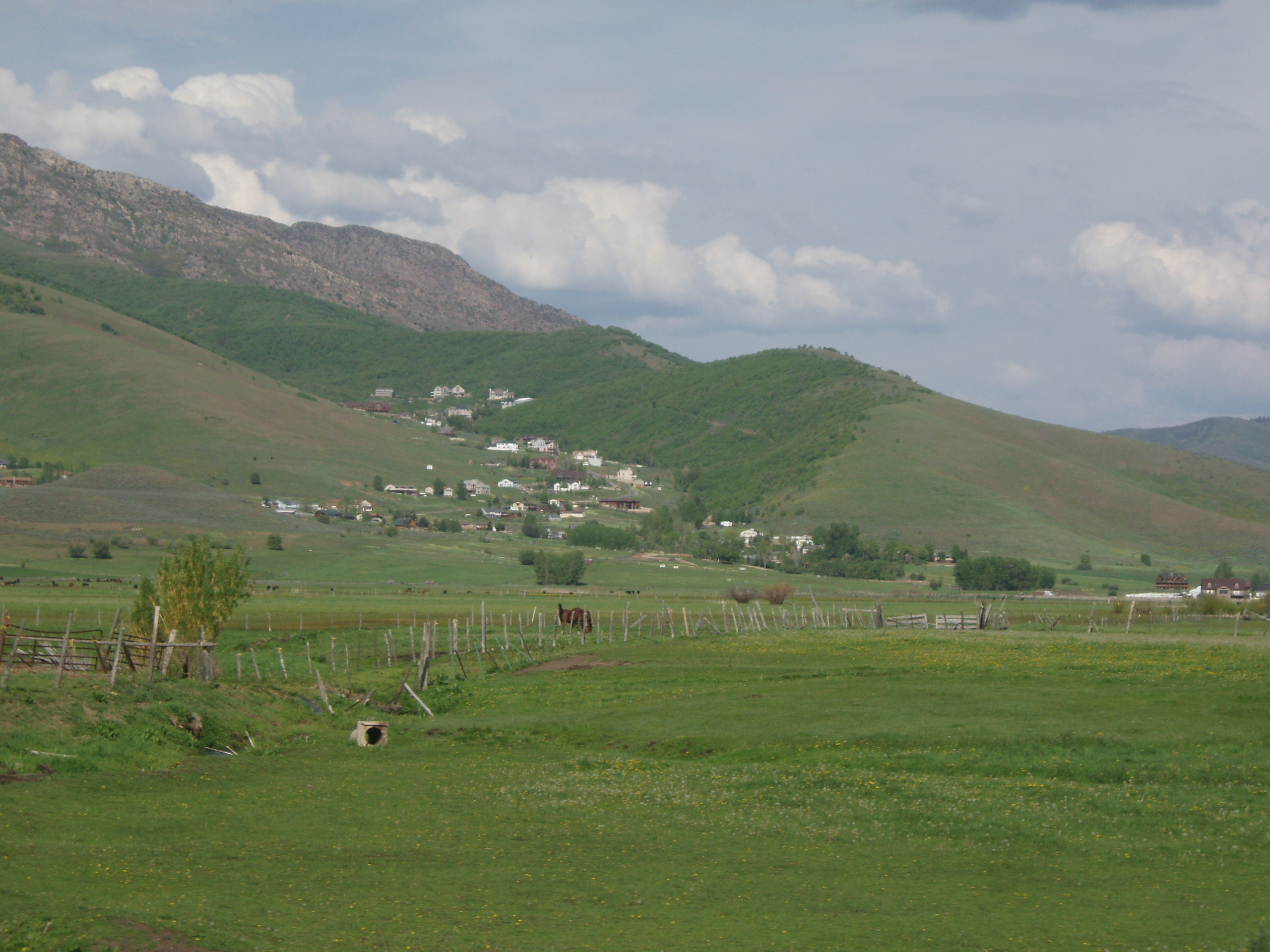
- The eastern part of Huntsville
- Nickname: McKayville
- Location in Weber County and the state of Utah
- Coordinates: 41°15′36″N 111°46′21″W
- Country: United States
- State: Utah
- County: Weber
- Founded: 1860
- Incorporated: 1924
- Founder: Jefferson Hunt

Area
  - Total: 0.89 sq mi (2.30 km^{2})
  - Land: 0.83 sq mi (2.15 km^{2})
  - Water: 0.058 sq mi (0.15 km^{2})
- Elevation: 4,931 ft (1,503 m)

Population (2020)
  - Total: 573
  - Density: 774.7/sq mi (299.13/km^{2})
- Time zone: UTC-7 (Mountain (MST))
  - Summer (DST): UTC-6 (MDT)
- ZIP code: 84317
- Area codes: 385, 801
- FIPS code: 49-37060
- GNIS feature ID: 1428949
- Website: huntsvilleutah.gov

Huntsville is a town in Weber County, Utah, United States. The population was 573 at the 2020 census. It is located in Ogden Valley. It is part of the Ogden–Clearfield, Utah Metropolitan Statistical Area, as well as the Ogden Valley census county division.

== History ==
Huntsville was founded in 1860 by Jefferson Hunt. An LDS ward was organized there in 1877 with Francis Hammond as Bishop, and he was succeeded in 1885 by David McKay. This David McKay was the father of David O. McKay, later president of the Church of Jesus Christ of Latter-day Saints. A Trappist monastery, the Abbey of Our Lady of the Holy Trinity, was established there in 1947, and closed after 70 years in 2017. The Shooting Star Saloon, the oldest continuously operating bar west of the Mississippi, is located in the town. It opened in 1879. It is known for the off-menu Star Burger: two patties with cheese, Polish knackwurst, and bacon.

== Geography ==
According to the United States Census Bureau, the town has a total area of 0.7 square miles (1.9 km^{2}), of which 0.6 square mile (1.7 km^{2}) is land and 0.1 square mile (0.2 km^{2}) (9.46%) is water.

=== Climate ===
This climatic region is typified by large seasonal temperature differences, with warm to hot (and often humid) summers and cold (sometimes severely cold) winters. According to the Köppen Climate Classification system, Huntsville has a humid continental climate, abbreviated "Dfb" on climate maps.

Climate data for Huntsville, Utah, 1991–2020 normals, 1976-2020 extremes: 5140ft (1567m)
Month	Jan	Feb	Mar	Apr	May	Jun	Jul	Aug	Sep	Oct	Nov	Dec	Year
Record high °F (°C)	57 (14)	62 (17)	77 (25)	86 (30)	93 (34)	97 (36)	102 (39)	102 (39)	95 (35)	88 (31)	73 (23)	64 (18)	102 (39)
Mean maximum °F (°C)	48.5 (9.2)	52.3 (11.3)	65.3 (18.5)	76.4 (24.7)	84.6 (29.2)	92.7 (33.7)	96.6 (35.9)	95.5 (35.3)	89.5 (31.9)	80.6 (27.0)	64.1 (17.8)	50.3 (10.2)	97.4 (36.3)
Mean daily maximum °F (°C)	34.2 (1.2)	40.7 (4.8)	51.2 (10.7)	60.3 (15.7)	71.3 (21.8)	81.9 (27.7)	90.1 (32.3)	89.1 (31.7)	79.2 (26.2)	64.3 (17.9)	47.7 (8.7)	35.0 (1.7)	62.1 (16.7)
Daily mean °F (°C)	22.6 (−5.2)	27.8 (−2.3)	37.6 (3.1)	45.5 (7.5)	54.2 (12.3)	62.2 (16.8)	69.5 (20.8)	68.2 (20.1)	59.3 (15.2)	47.2 (8.4)	34.8 (1.6)	23.8 (−4.6)	46.1 (7.8)
Mean daily minimum °F (°C)	10.9 (−11.7)	14.9 (−9.5)	24.0 (−4.4)	30.7 (−0.7)	37.2 (2.9)	42.6 (5.9)	48.9 (9.4)	47.3 (8.5)	39.3 (4.1)	30.2 (−1.0)	22.0 (−5.6)	12.7 (−10.7)	30.1 (−1.1)
Mean minimum °F (°C)	−9.6 (−23.1)	−8.2 (−22.3)	4.1 (−15.5)	16.7 (−8.5)	23.7 (−4.6)	30.5 (−0.8)	38.4 (3.6)	36.0 (2.2)	26.0 (−3.3)	16.3 (−8.7)	0.4 (−17.6)	−7.4 (−21.9)	−15.1 (−26.2)
Record low °F (°C)	−33 (−36)	−34 (−37)	−17 (−27)	0 (−18)	16 (−9)	24 (−4)	31 (−1)	23 (−5)	18 (−8)	9 (−13)	−16 (−27)	−37 (−38)	−37 (−38)
Average precipitation inches (mm)	2.76 (70)	2.19 (56)	2.00 (51)	1.90 (48)	2.14 (54)	1.34 (34)	0.69 (18)	0.78 (20)	1.31 (33)	1.79 (45)	1.80 (46)	2.44 (62)	21.14 (537)
Average snowfall inches (cm)	22.50 (57.2)	17.40 (44.2)	7.20 (18.3)	3.10 (7.9)	0.30 (0.76)	0.00 (0.00)	0.00 (0.00)	0.00 (0.00)	0.00 (0.00)	1.80 (4.6)	7.30 (18.5)	22.80 (57.9)	82.4 (209.36)
Source 1: NOAA
Source 2: XMACIS2 (records & monthly max/mins)

== Demographics ==
Historical population
Census	Pop.	Note	%±
1870	1,051		—
1880	819		−22.1%
1890	1,158		41.4%
1900	1,022		−11.7%
1910	906		−11.4%
1920	814		−10.2%
1930	520		−36.1%
1940	496		−4.6%
1950	494		−0.4%
1960	552		11.7%
1970	553		0.2%
1980	577		4.3%
1990	561		−2.8%
2000	649		15.7%
2010	608		−6.3%
2020	573		−5.8%
U.S. Decennial Census

As of the census of 2000, there were 649 people, 194 households, and 163 families residing in the town. The population density was 965.3 people per square mile (374.0/km^{2}). There were 219 housing units at an average density of 325.7 per square mile (126.2/km^{2}). The racial makeup of the town was 98.77% White, 0.15% African American, 0.31% Native American, 0.15% from other races, and 0.62% from two or more races. Hispanic or Latino of any race were 3.08% of the population.

There were 194 households, out of which 46.4% had children under the age of 18 living with them, 70.6% were married couples living together, 10.3% had a female householder with no husband present, and 15.5% were non-families. 13.4% of all households were made up of individuals, and 7.7% had someone living alone who was 65 years of age or older. The average household size was 3.35 and the average family size was 3.70.

In the town, the population was spread out, with 33.7% under the age of 18, 11.1% from 18 to 24, 21.4% from 25 to 44, 21.9% from 45 to 64, and 11.9% who were 65 years of age or older. The median age was 34 years. For every 100 females, there were 108.7 males. For every 100 females age 18 and over, there were 102.8 males.

The median income for a household in the town was $50,625, and the median income for a family was $52,656. Males had a median income of $37,411 versus $31,528 for females. The per capita income for the town was $16,232. About 4.3% of families and 5.9% of the population were below the poverty line, including 5.1% of those under age 18 and 7.6% of those age 65 or over.

== Gallery ==
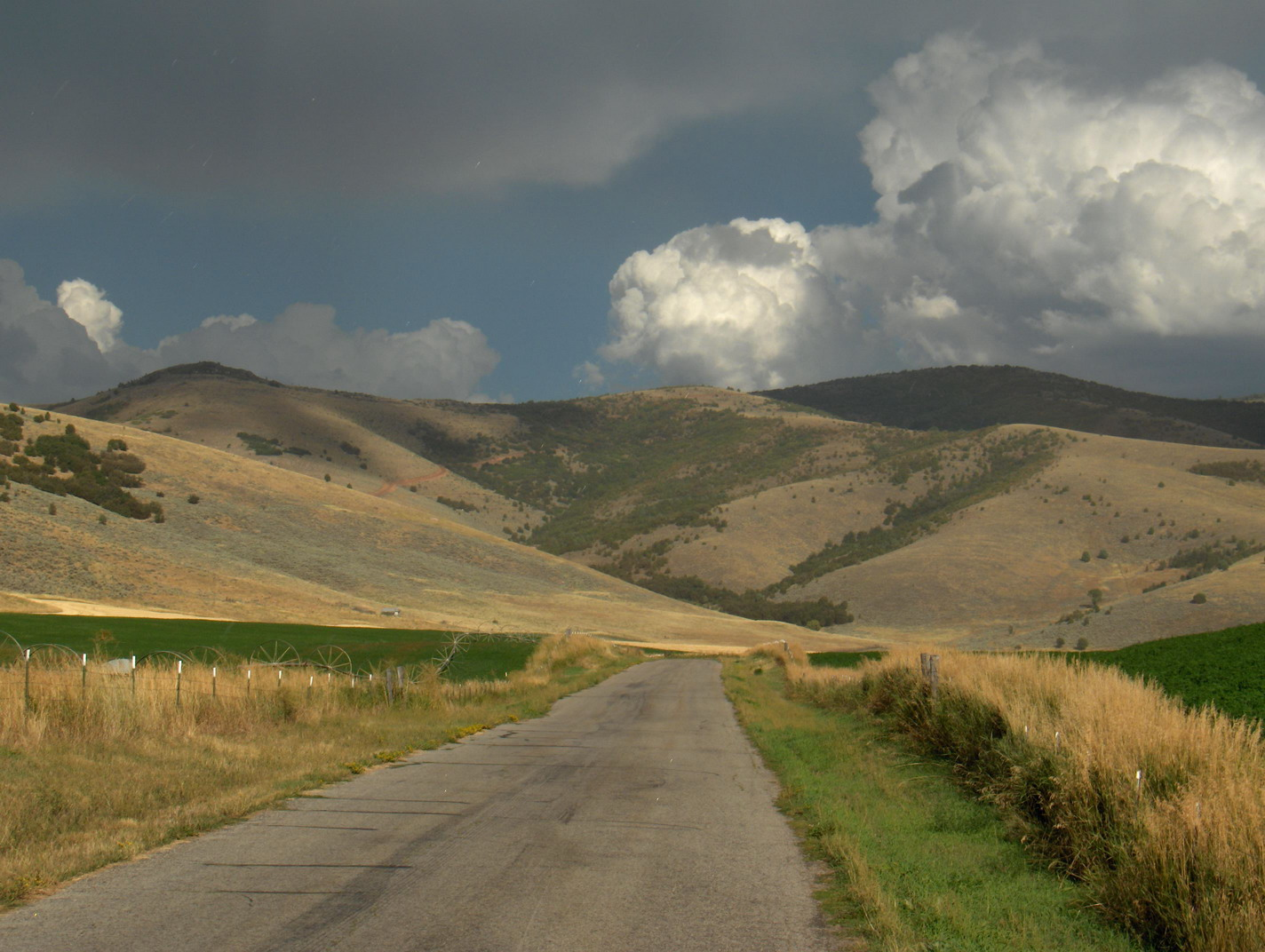
Abbey Road of the former monastery in Huntsville

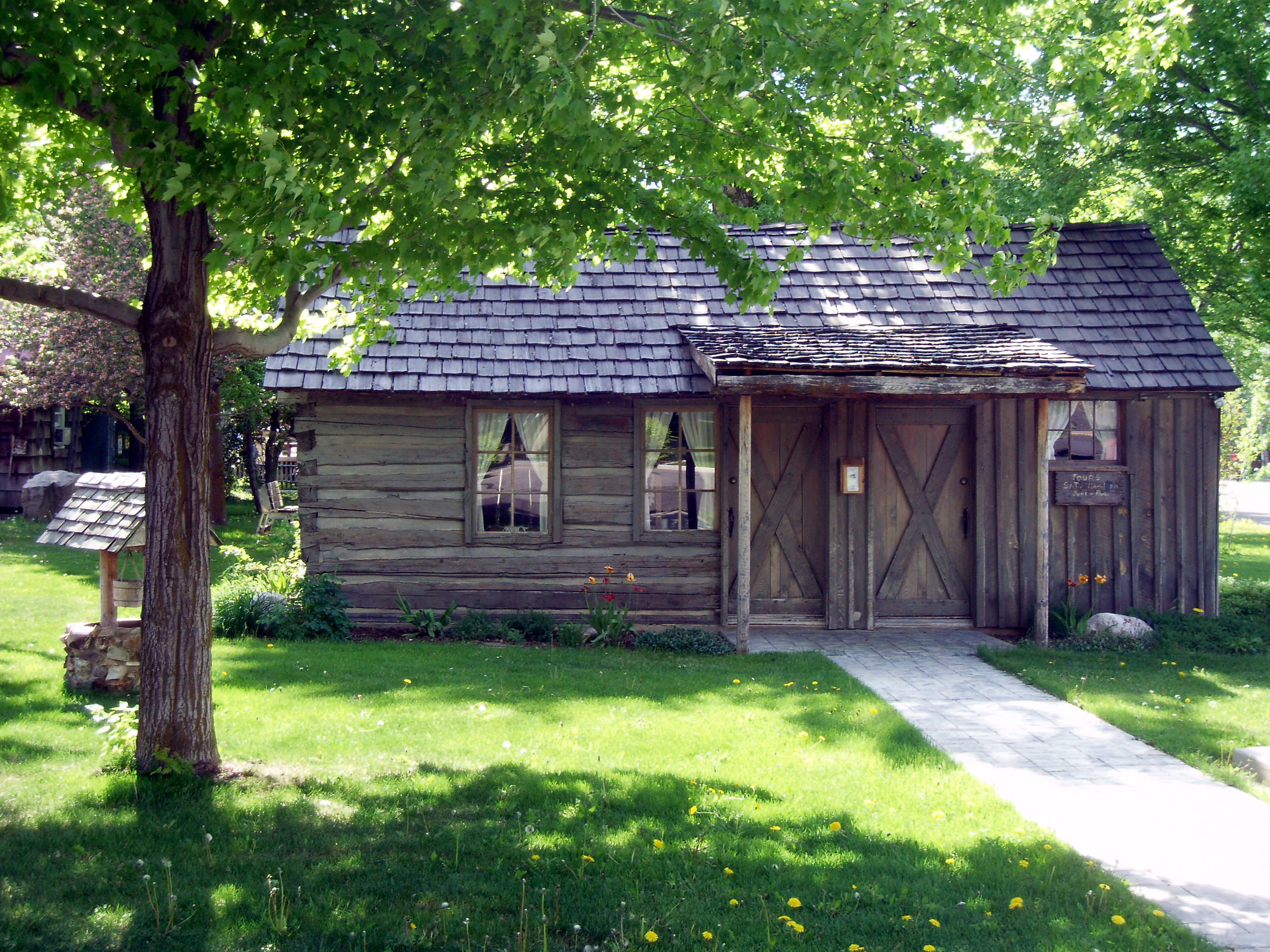
Aldous Cabin Huntsville

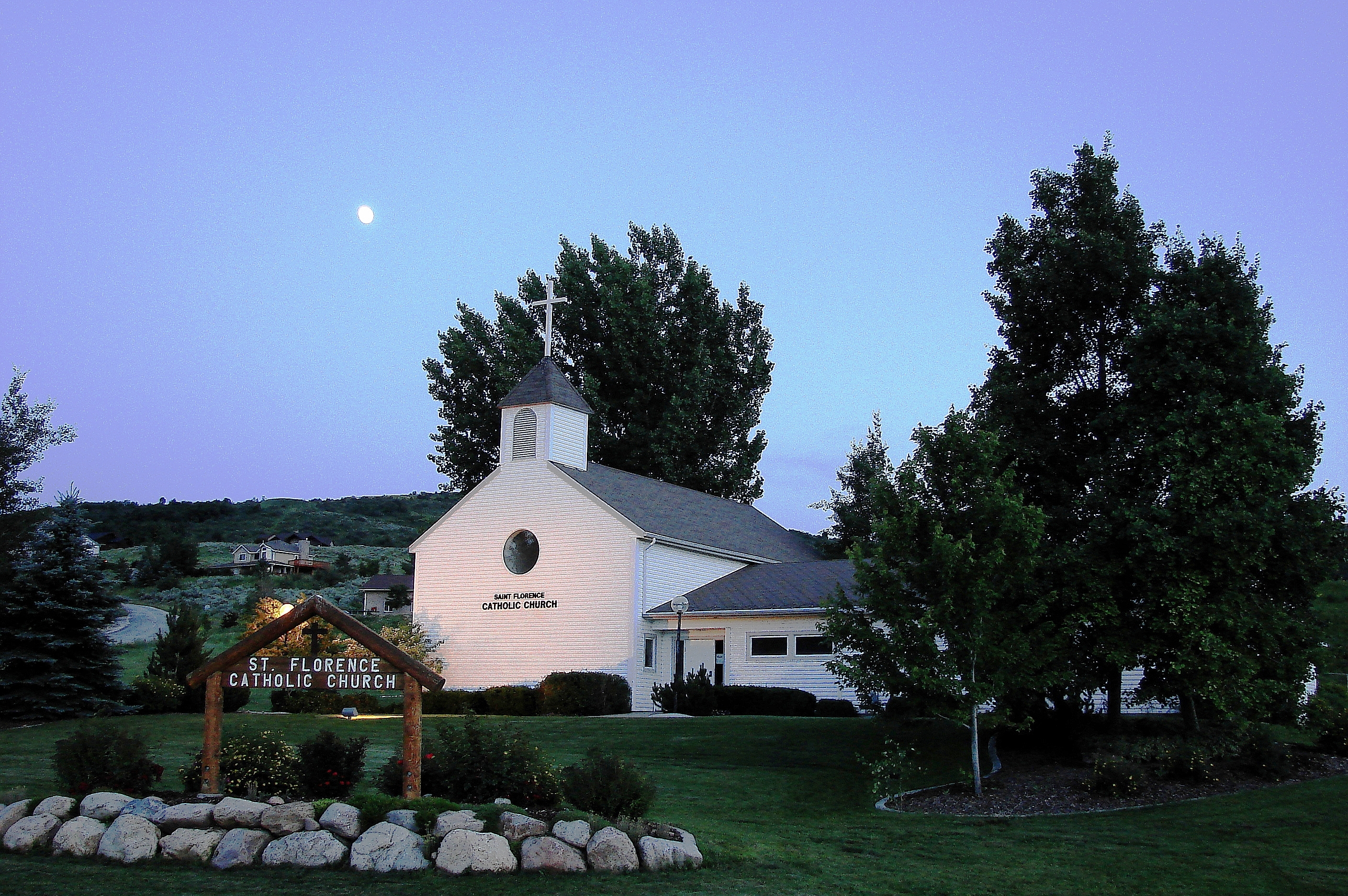
Saint Florence Catholic Church - Huntsville

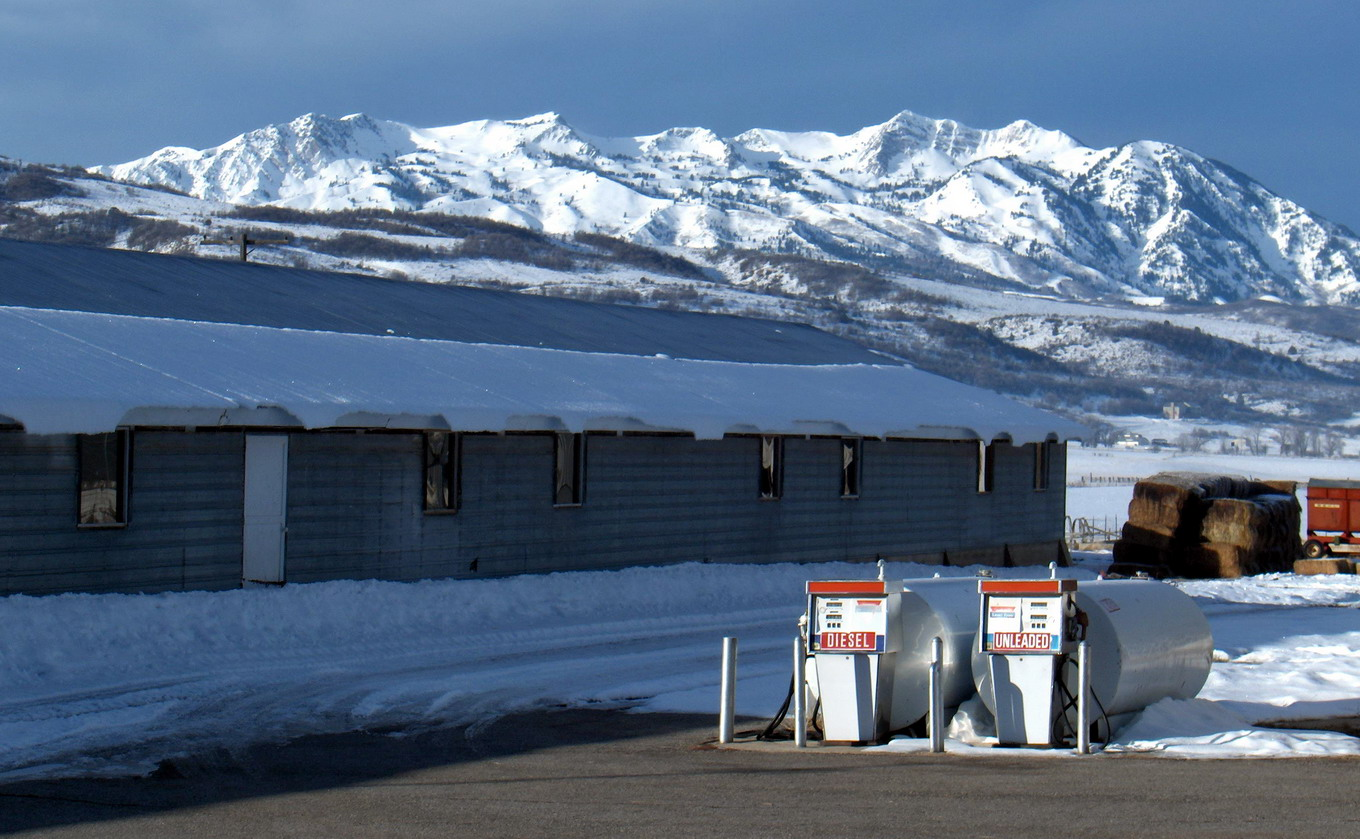
Snowbasin Ski Area from Huntsville

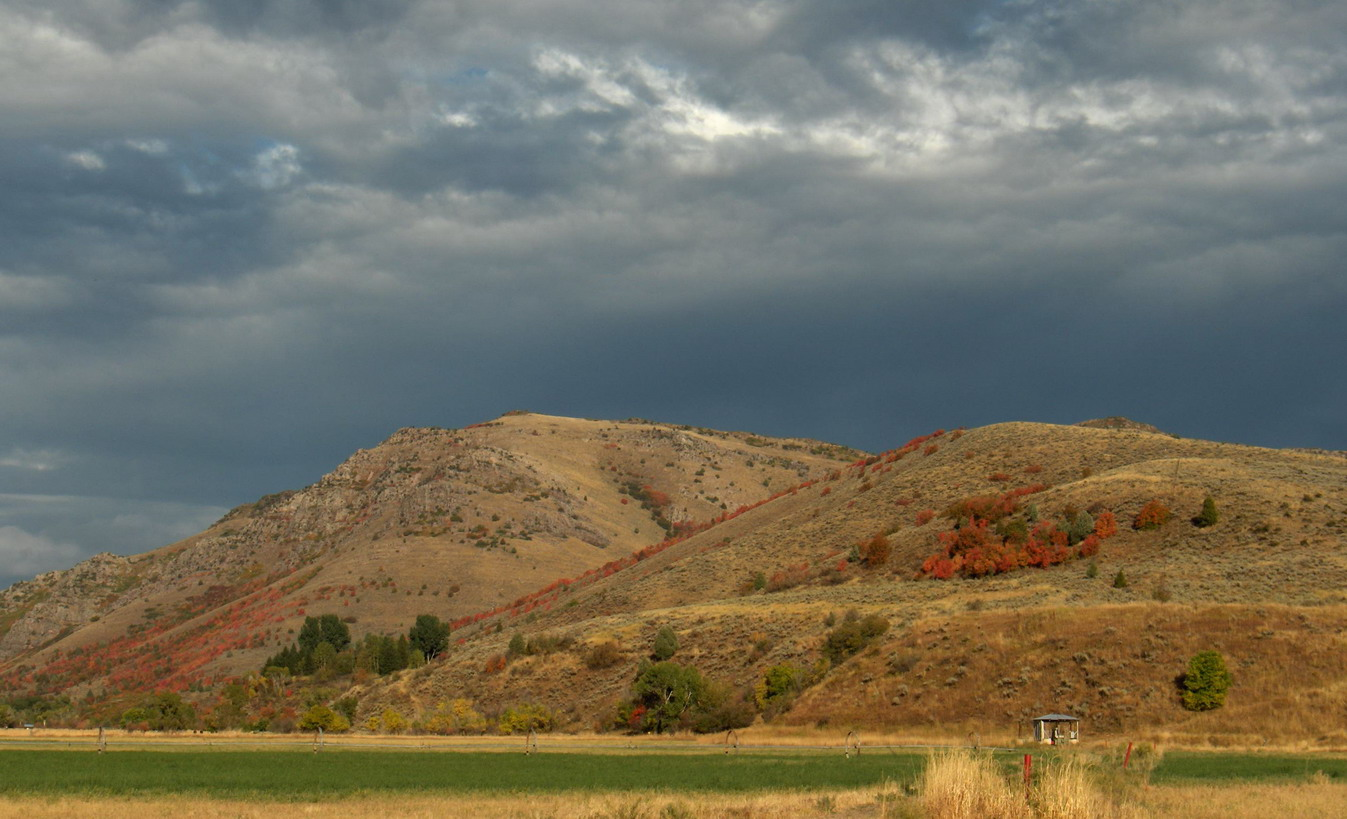
Fall clouds - Huntsville

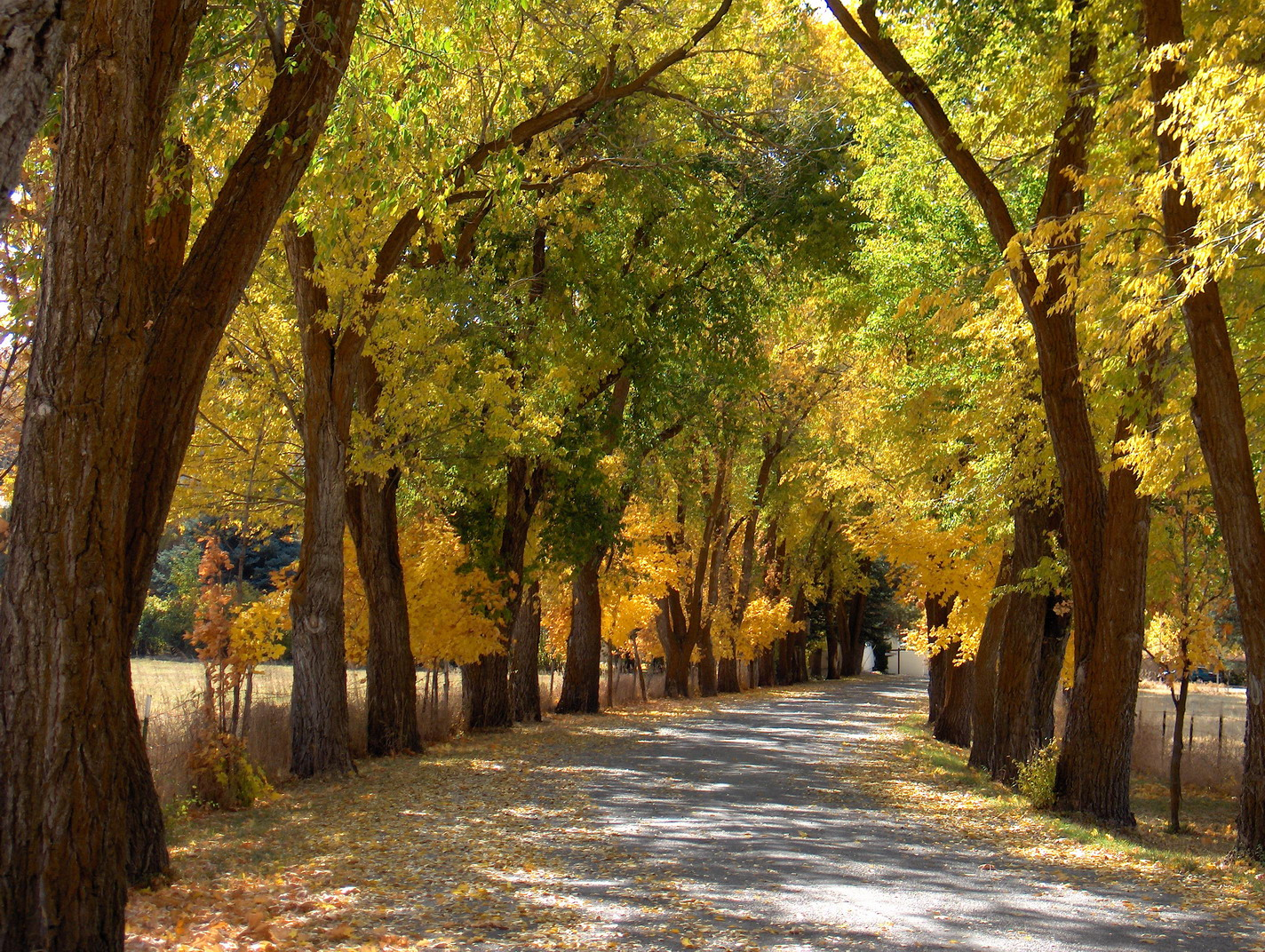
Fall leaves - Huntsville

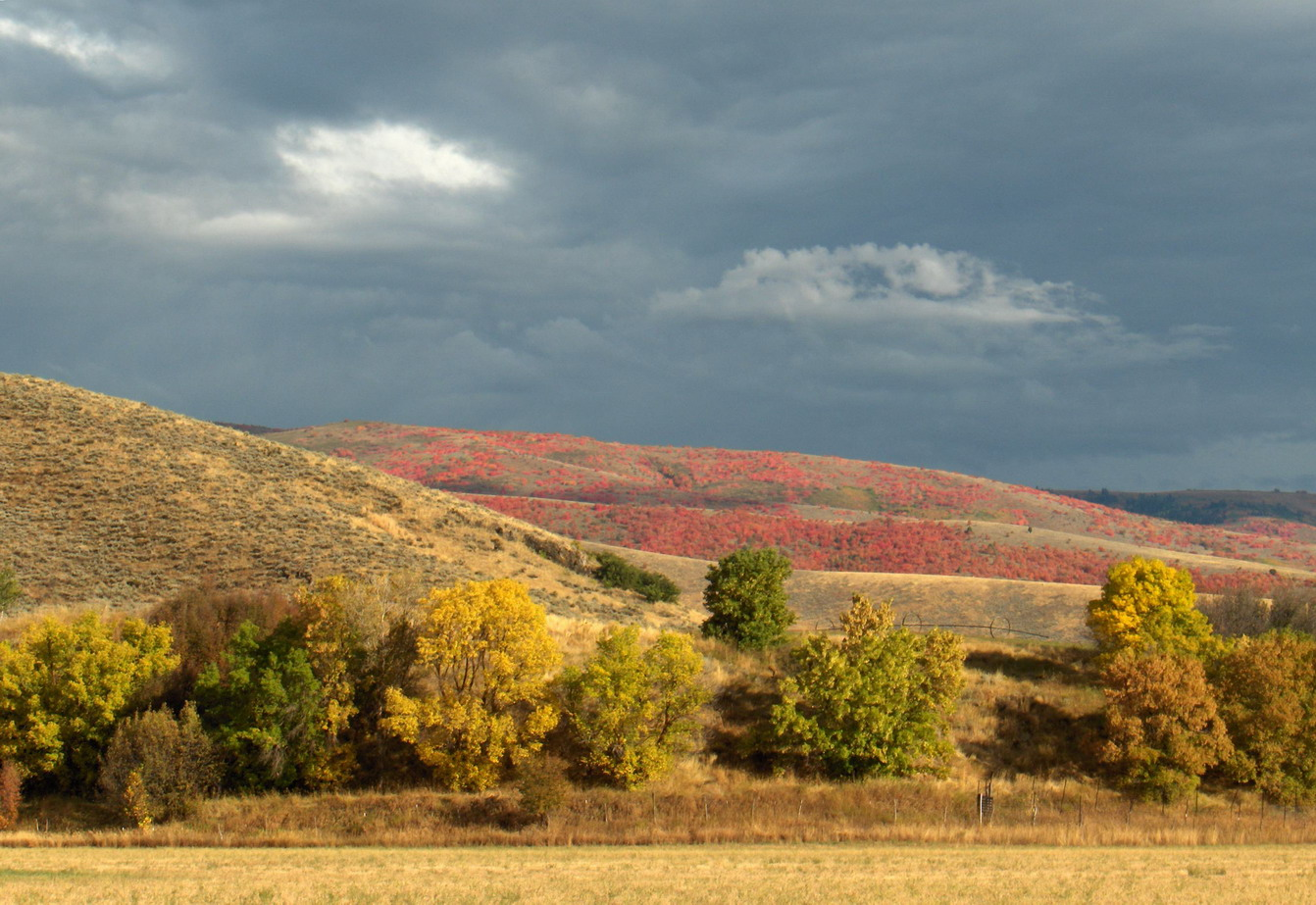
Fall colors - Huntsville

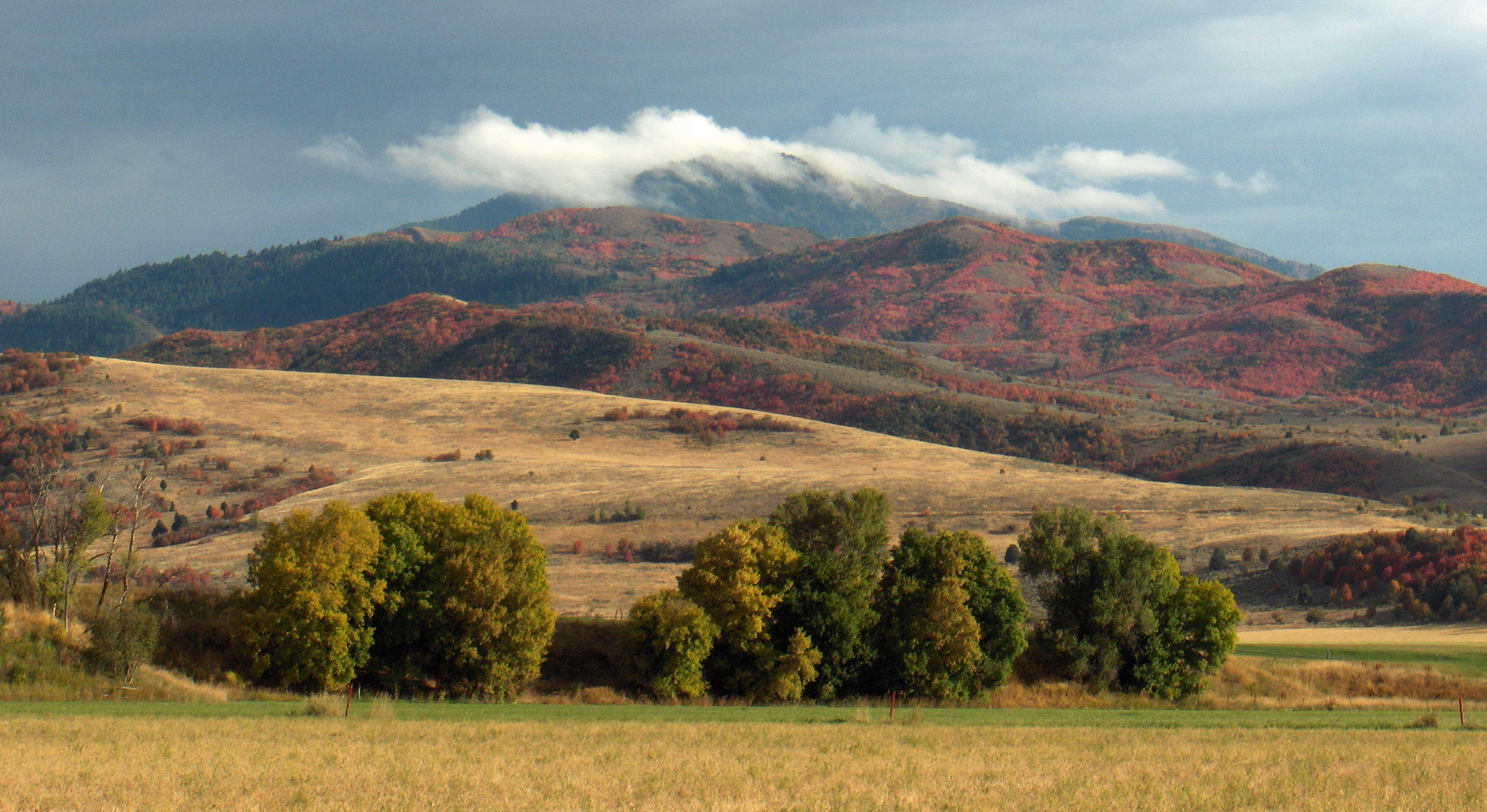
Cloud - Huntsville

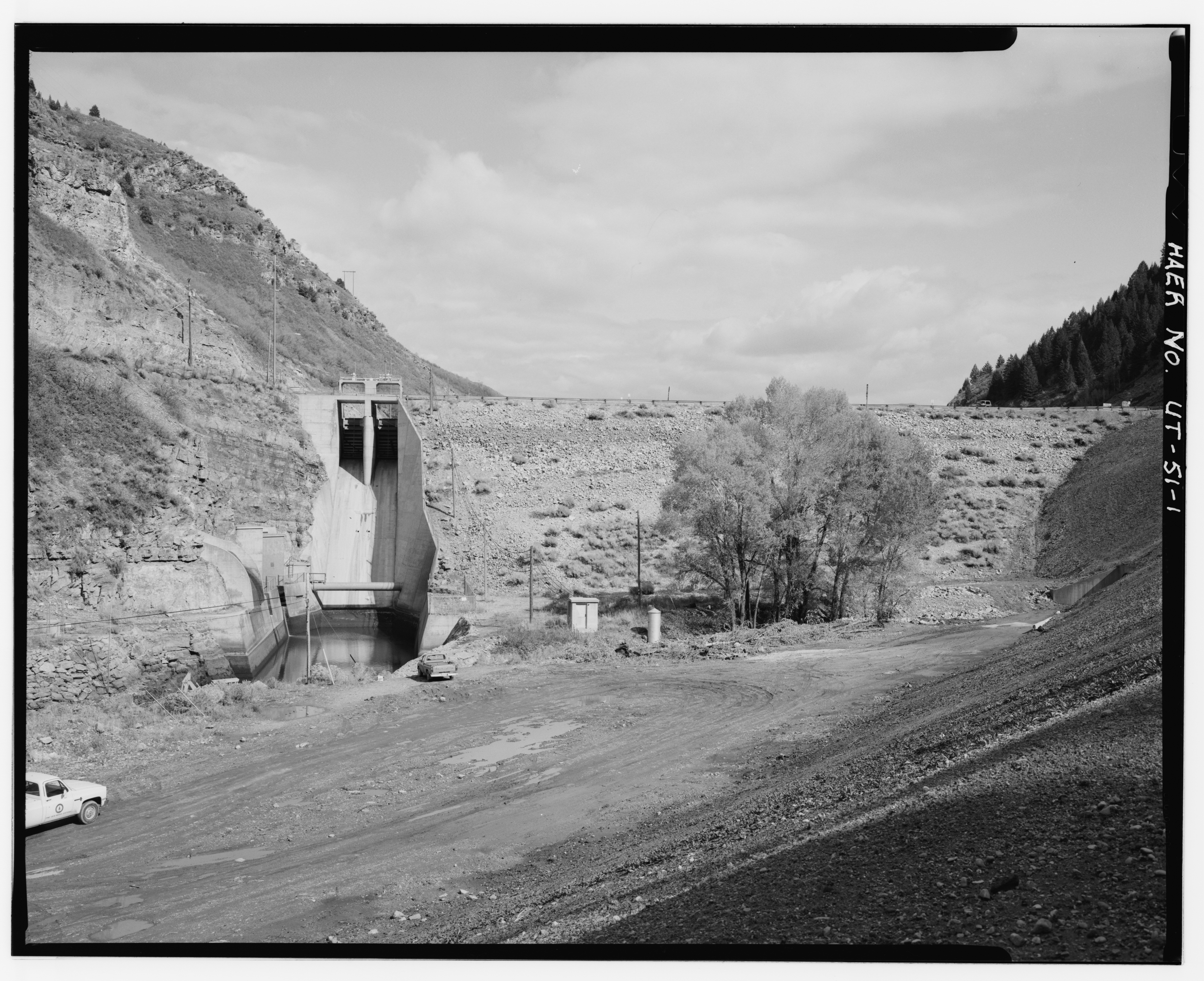
Pineview Dam

== Federal representation ==
Huntsville is located in Utah's First Congressional District. For the 117th United States Congress, this district is represented by Blake Moore (R-Ogden)

== See also ==
- List of municipalities in Utah
