= List of television stations in Utah =

This is a list of broadcast television stations that are licensed in the U.S. state of Utah.

== Full-power ==
- Stations are arranged by media market served and channel position.

Full-power television stations in Utah
Media market	Station	Channel	Primary affiliation(s)	Notes	Refs
Cedar City	KCSG	8	MeTV		
Logan	KUTF	12	Daystar		
Richfield	KUES	7	PBS	(Note: Satellite of KUED.)	
St. George	KMYU	12	MyNetworkTV, CBS on 2.1		
St. George	KUEW	18	PBS		
Salt Lake City	KUTV	2	CBS, MyNetworkTV on 2.2		
Salt Lake City	KTVX	4	ABC		
Salt Lake City	KSL-TV	5	NBC		
Salt Lake City	KUED	7	PBS		
Salt Lake City	KUEN	9	First Nations Experience	(Note: Licensed to Ogden, Utah.)	
Salt Lake City	KBYU-TV	11	BYU TV	(Note: Licensed to Provo, Utah.)	
Salt Lake City	KSTU	13	Fox		
Salt Lake City	KJZZ-TV	14	Independent		
Salt Lake City	KUPX-TV	16	Independent, Ion Television on 16.4		
Salt Lake City	KTMW	20	Telemundo, TeleXitos on 20.2		
Salt Lake City	KPNZ	24	TCT		
Salt Lake City	KUCW	30	The CW		
Salt Lake City	KUTH-DT	32	Univision, UniMás on 32.2		
Vernal	KEMS	16	Ion Television		

== Low-power ==
Low-power television stations in Utah
Media market	Station	Channel	Primary affiliation(s)	Notes	Refs
Logan	K08QL-D	8	MeTV		
Logan	KCVB-LD	26	Independent		
Logan	KUTA-LD	30	Various		
Logan	KJDN-LD	39	[Blank]		
Nephi	K05MX-D	26	[Blank]		
Richfield	KTTA-LD	8	Independent	(Note: Licensed to Monroe, Utah.)	
Salt Lake City	K08QQ-D	3	Various		
Salt Lake City	KPDR-LD	19	Various		
Salt Lake City	KBTU-LD	23	Various		
Salt Lake City	KSVN-CD	25	Various		
Salt Lake City	KUCL-LD	26	Hope Channel		
Salt Lake City	KSUD-LD	33	Daystar		
Salt Lake City	K16LW-D	43	Silent		
Wendover	K08QM-D	8	[Blank]		

== Translators ==
Television station translators in Utah
Media market	Station	Channel	Translating	Notes	Refs
Alton	K32LZ-D	2	KUTV		
Alton	K30OE-D	4	KTVX		
Alton	K29JA-D	5	KSL-TV		
Alton	K36NO-D	7	KUED		
Alton	K35JZ-D	8	KTTA-LD		
Alton	K31KP-D	9	KUEN		
Alton	K33NQ-D	11	KBYU-TV		
Alton	K27KH-D	13	KSTU	(Note: Licensed to Orderville, Utah.)	
Alton	K34FO-D	14	KJZZ-TV		
Antimony	K35NJ-D	2	KUTV		
Antimony	K36IG-D	4	KTVX		
Antimony	K34OC-D	5	KSL-TV		
Antimony	K33OO-D	7	KUED		
Antimony	K32MV-D	9	KUEN		
Antimony	K31OA-D	11	KBYU-TV		
Antimony	K30OS-D	13	KSTU		
Antimony	K29MB-D	14	KJZZ-TV		
Beaver	K31OK-D	2	KUTV		
Beaver	K30PH-D	4	KTVX		
Beaver	K33PF-D	5	KSL-TV		
Beaver	K07ZY-D	7	KUED		
Beaver	K32NB-D	8	KCSG		
Beaver	K09ZT-D	9	KUEN		
Beaver	K36FM-D	11	KBYU-TV		
Beaver	K13AAL-D	13	KSTU		
Beaver	K34OQ-D	14	KJZZ-TV		
Beaver	K35NW-D	16	KUPX-TV		
Beaver	K11XI-D	30	KUCW		
Beryl	K18MC-D	2	KUTV	(Note: Licensed to Enterprise, Utah.)	
Beryl	K27GB-D	2	KUTV		
Beryl	K05BU-D	4	KTVX		
Beryl	K32ND-D	4	KTVX	(Note: Licensed to Modena, Utah.)	
Beryl	K07ED-D	5	KSL-TV		
Beryl	K08EN-D	5	KSL-TV	(Note: Licensed to Pine Valley, Utah.)	
Beryl	K29FA-D	5	KSL-TV		
Beryl	K21EI-D	7	KUED		
Beryl	K30PJ-D	9	KUEN		
Beryl	K33JE-D	11	KBYU-TV		
Beryl	K31OI-D	12	KMYU	(Note: Licensed to Beryl and Modena, Utah.)	
Beryl	K25GY-D	13	KSTU		
Beryl	K23DV-D	14	KJZZ-TV		
Beryl	K35NV-D	16	KUPX-TV		
Beryl	K34OU-D	30	KUCW		
Blanding–Monticello	K08PY-D	2	KUTV		
Blanding–Monticello	K33OY-D	4	KTVX		
Blanding–Monticello	K10RK-D	5	KSL-TV		
Blanding–Monticello	K07ZU-D	7	KUED		
Blanding–Monticello	K13AAF-D	8	KJCT-LP		
Blanding–Monticello	K09ZN-D	9	KUEN		
Blanding–Monticello	K11XH-D	11	KBYU-TV		
Blanding–Monticello	K36AK-D	13	KSTU		
Blanding–Monticello	K35NO-D	14	KJZZ-TV		
Blanding–Monticello	K25JT-D	30	KUCW		
Blanding–Monticello	K34OO-D	30	KUCW		
Bluff	K18MQ-D	2	KUTV		
Bluff	K23KC-D	4	KTVX		
Bluff	K17JF-D	5	KSL-TV		
Bluff	K21KC-D	7	KUED		
Bluff	K19HE-D	11	KBYU-TV		
Bluff	K15HN-D	13	KSTU		
Bluff	K16MP-D	14	KJZZ-TV		
Boulder	K31JF-D	2	KUTV		
Boulder	K32HQ-D	4	KTVX		
Boulder	K33IZ-D	5	KSL-TV		
Boulder	K34IY-D	7	KUED		
Boulder	K36OO-D	8	KTTA-LD		
Boulder	K28OP-D	9	KUEN		
Boulder	K29MA-D	11	KBYU-TV		
Boulder	K30OV-D	13	KSTU		
Boulder	K35NL-D	14	KJZZ-TV		
Caineville	K30OO-D	2	KUTV		
Caineville	K32MP-D	4	KTVX		
Caineville	K33OM-D	5	KSL-TV		
Caineville	K34OF-D	7	KUED		
Caineville	K36OQ-D	8	KTTA-LD		
Caineville	K28OR-D	9	KUEN		
Caineville	K29IX-D	11	KBYU-TV		
Caineville	K31KN-D	13	KSTU		
Caineville	K35NM-D	14	KJZZ-TV		
Cedar Canyon	K05NG-D	2	KUTV		
Cedar Canyon	K06JA-D	4	KTVX		
Cedar Canyon	K03IW-D	5	KSL-TV		
Cedar Canyon	K31EI-D	7	KUED		
Cedar Canyon	K04RW-D	13	KSTU		
Cedar Canyon	K33EB-D	14	KJZZ-TV		
Cedar Canyon	K02RI-D	16	KUPX-TV		
Cedar City	K09CJ-D	2	KUTV		
Cedar City	K11CQ-D	4	KTVX		
Cedar City	K16MS-D	4	KTVX		
Cedar City	K13CP-D	5	KSL-TV		
Cedar City	K17NK-D	5	KSL-TV		
Cedar City	K07GQ-D	7	KUED		
Cedar City	K18MT-D	9	KUEN		
Cedar City	K20NK-D	11	KBYU-TV		
Cedar City	K08PJ-D	12	KMYU		
Cedar City	K10PN-D	13	KSTU		
Cedar City	K12QQ-D	14	KJZZ-TV		
Cedar City	K19LU-D	16	KUPX-TV		
Cedar City	K21NK-D	30	KUCW		
Cedar Mountain	K36PD-D	2	KUTV	(Note: Licensed to Green River, Utah.)	
Cedar Mountain	K35OB-D	4	KTVX		
Cedar Mountain	K34PC-D	5	KSL-TV		
Cedar Mountain	K33PK-D	7	KUED		
Cedar Mountain	K32NG-D	9	KUEN		
Cedar Mountain	K31OO-D	11	KBYU-TV		
Cedar Mountain	K30PN-D	13	KSTU		
Cedar Mountain	K29MS-D	14	KJZZ-TV		
Cedar Mountain	K28PN-D	16	KUPX-TV		
Cedar Mountain	K27NU-D	30	KUCW		
Circleville	K19GM-D	2	KUTV		
Circleville	K21IB-D	4	KTVX		
Circleville	K14RG-D	5	KSL-TV		
Circleville	K15KX-D	7	KUED		
Circleville	K17MB-D	8	KTTA-LD		
Circleville	K22MU-D	9	KUEN		
Circleville	K16MM-D	11	KBYU-TV		
Circleville	K18MI-D	13	KSTU		
Circleville	K20NB-D	14	KJZZ-TV		
Clear Creek	K34KP-D	2	KUTV		
Clear Creek	K35OD-D	4	KTVX		
Clear Creek	K33PO-D	5	KSL-TV		
Clear Creek	K32NI-D	7	KUED		
Clear Creek	K36JT-D	9	KUEN		
Clear Creek	K31OT-D	11	KBYU-TV		
Clear Creek	K28KP-D	13	KSTU		
Clear Creek	K30PQ-D	14	KJZZ-TV		
Clear Creek	K29IW-D	16	KUPX-TV		
Clear Creek	K27NY-D	30	KUCW		
Coalville	K15KQ-D	2	KUTV		
Coalville	K34OK-D	4	KTVX		
Coalville	K36OT-D	5	KSL-TV		
Coalville	K28OT-D	7	KUED		
Coalville	K29IN-D	11	KBYU-TV		
Coalville	K30KG-D	13	KSTU		
Coalville	K31KC-D	14	KJZZ-TV		
Coalville	K32IT-D	30	KUCW		
Delta	K31OJ-D	2	KUTV		
Delta	K35NU-D	4	KTVX	(Note: Licensed to Delta and Oak City, Utah.)	
Delta	K38JT-D	5	KSL-TV		
Delta	K32MI-D	7	KUED		
Delta	K25PF-D	8	KCSG		
Delta	K27NM-D	9	KUEN		
Delta	K49LR-D	11	KBYU-TV		
Delta	K29KD-D	12	KMYU		
Delta	K30PG-D	13	KSTU		
Delta	K36IK-D	14	KJZZ-TV		
Delta	K45LX-D	16	KUPX-TV		
Delta	K33KW-D	24	KPNZ		
Delta	K28PD-D	30	KUCW		
Duchesne	K30LF-D	2	KUTV		
Duchesne	K31JC-D	4	KTVX		
Duchesne	K32HX-D	5	KSL-TV		
Duchesne	K33LA-D	7	KUED		
Duchesne	K34FV-D	9	KUEN		
Duchesne	K35IK-D	11	KBYU-TV		
Duchesne	K36IM-D	13	KSTU		
Duchesne	K29MW-D	14	KJZZ-TV		
Duchesne	K28PH-D	16	KUPX-TV		
Duchesne	K27NP-D	30	KUCW		
Emery	K36PC-D	2	KUTV		
Emery	K35OA-D	4	KTVX		
Emery	K34PB-D	5	KSL-TV		
Emery	K33PJ-D	7	KUED		
Emery	K31LG-D	8	KTTA-LD		
Emery	K28KN-D	9	KUEN		
Emery	K29MR-D	11	KBYU-TV		
Emery	K28PI-D	13	KSTU		
Emery	K27IS-D	14	KJZZ-TV		
Emery	K32JI-D	14	KJZZ-TV		
Emery	K30KH-D	30	KUCW		
Escalante	K28OM-D	2	KUTV		
Escalante	K30OR-D	4	KTVX		
Escalante	K32MR-D	5	KSL-TV		
Escalante	K33OQ-D	7	KUED		
Escalante	K36ON-D	8	KTTA-LD		
Escalante	K34NY-D	9	KUEN		
Escalante	K35NG-D	11	KBYU-TV		
Escalante	K29HN-D	13	KSTU		
Escalante	K31JE-D	14; 16; 30	K28IT-D		
Ferron	K36PF-D	2	KUTV		
Ferron	K35OC-D	4	KTVX		
Ferron	K34PH-D	5	KSL-TV		
Ferron	K33PN-D	7	KUED		
Ferron	K32NH-D	9	KUEN		
Ferron	K31OS-D	11	KBYU-TV		
Ferron	K30PP-D	13	KSTU		
Ferron	K27KC-D	14	KJZZ-TV		
Ferron	K28KQ-D	16	KUPX-TV		
Ferron	K29IY-D	30	KUCW		
Fillmore	K25JJ-D	2	KUTV		
Fillmore	K28PC-D	4	KTVX		
Fillmore	K26OB-D	5	KSL-TV		
Fillmore	K27JT-D	7	KUED		
Fillmore	K36KI-D	8	KCSG		
Fillmore	K30PF-D	9	KUEN		
Fillmore	K35NX-D	11	KBYU-TV		
Fillmore	K29MN-D	13	KSTU		
Fillmore	K33QZ-D	16	KUPX-TV		
Fillmore	K34GO-D	24	K24NA-D		
Fillmore	K32JW-D	30	KUCW		
Fillmore	K31ON-D	32	KUTH-DT		
Fish Lake	K26NV-D	2	KUTV		
Fish Lake	K28OQ-D	4	KTVX		
Fish Lake	K30OW-D	5	KSL-TV		
Fish Lake	K23KP-D	7	KUED		
Fish Lake	K25LH-D	9	KUEN		
Fish Lake	K27KR-D	11	KBYU-TV		
Fish Lake	K29JQ-D	13	KSTU		
Fish Lake	K31LH-D	14	KJZZ-TV		
Ford Ridge	K22JZ-D	2	KUTV		
Ford Ridge	K24HP-D	4	KTVX		
Ford Ridge	K17NP-D	7	KUED	(Note: Licensed to Columbia, Utah.)	
Ford Ridge	K15LP-D	9	KUEN	(Note: Licensed to Rural Carbon County, Utah.)	
Ford Ridge	K23IV-D	11	KBYU-TV		
Ford Ridge	K18MY-D	13	KSTU	(Note: Licensed to East Carbon County, Utah.)	
Ford Ridge	K21EZ-D	14	KJZZ-TV		
Ford Ridge	K19MF-D	16	KUPX-TV		
Ford Ridge	K20NP-D	30	KUCW		
Fountain Green	K30KK-D	2	KUTV		
Fountain Green	K32JB-D	4	KTVX		
Fountain Green	K34KQ-D	5	KSL-TV		
Fountain Green	K35JK-D	7	KUED		
Fountain Green	K27NG-D	9	KUEN		
Fountain Green	K28OO-D	11	KBYU-TV		
Fountain Green	K29LZ-D	13	KSTU		
Fountain Green	K31NX-D	14	KJZZ-TV		
Fountain Green	K33OU-D	16	KUPX-TV		
Fountain Green	K36MI-D	30	KUCW		
Fremont	K30OQ-D	2	KUTV		
Fremont	K24HP-D	4	KTVX		
Fremont	K28OL-D	5	KSL-TV		
Fremont	K33OL-D	7	KUED		
Fremont	K29IV-D	9	KUEN		
Fremont	K34NZ-D	11	KBYU-TV		
Fremont	K35NE-D	13	KSTU		
Fremont	K36OH-D	14	KJZZ-TV		
Fremont	K31LA-D	16	KUPX-TV		
Fruita	K30ON-D	2	KUTV	(Note: Licensed to Capitol Reef National Park, Utah.)	
Fruita	K32MO-D	4	KTVX		
Fruita	K34OA-D	5	KSL-TV		
Fruita	718093	7	KUED		
Fruitland	K14RT-D	2	KUTV		
Fruitland	K15LO-D	4	KTVX		
Fruitland	K16NC-D	5	KSL-TV		
Fruitland	K17NY-D	7	KUED		
Fruitland	K34IV-D	9	KUEN		
Fruitland	K36IN-D	11	KBYU-TV		
Fruitland	K19MH-D	13	KSTU		
Fruitland	K20NV-D	14	KJZZ-TV		
Garfield	K15KS-D	2	KUTV		
Garfield	K16LZ-D	4	KTVX		
Garfield	K17MT-D	5	KSL-TV		
Garfield	K18MH-D	7	KUED		
Garfield	K13ZM-D	8	KTTA-LD		
Garfield	K19LG-D	9	KUEN		
Garfield	K20MR-D	11	KBYU-TV		
Garfield	K21MX-D	13	KSTU		
Garfield	K22MM-D	14; 16; 30	K28IT-D		
Garfield County	K31NP-D	2	KUTV		
Garfield County	K32ML-D	4	KTVX		
Garfield County	K33OJ-D	5	KSL-TV		
Garfield County	K34NW-D	7	KUED		
Garfield County	K10QG-D	8	KTTA-LD		
Garfield County	K35ND-D	9	KUEN		
Garfield County	K36OE-D	11	KBYU-TV		
Garfield County	K28GM-D	13	KSTU		
Garfield County	K30GA-D	14	KJZZ-TV		
Garrison	K36IR-D	2	KUTV		
Garrison	K31OM-D	4	KTVX		
Garrison	K33PH-D	5	KSL-TV		
Garrison	K35IR-D	7	KUED		
Garrison	K30PI-D	8	KCSG		
Garrison	K34PA-D	13	KSTU		
Garrison	K13AAM-D	16	KUPX-TV		
Garrison	K29MP-D	24	KBYU-TV; KUPX-TV; KMTI-LD; KTTA-LD		
Garrison	K32NE-D	30	KUCW		
Green River	K15HH-D	2	KUTV		
Green River	K16HD-D	4	KTVX		
Green River	K17HW-D	5	KSL-TV		
Green River	K18IT-D	7	KUED		
Green River	K19ID-D	9	KUEN		
Green River	K20JZ-D	11	KBYU-TV		
Green River	K21JV-D	13	KSTU		
Green River	K22JG-D	14	KJZZ-TV		
Green River	K23JV-D	16	KUPX-TV		
Green River	K24IN-D	30	KUCW		
Hanksville	K28OK-D	2	KUTV		
Hanksville	K29LX-D	4	KTVX		
Hanksville	K30OP-D	5	KSL-TV		
Hanksville	K31NU-D	7	KUED		
Hanksville	K36OP-D	8	KTTA-LD		
Hanksville	K32MU-D	9	KUEN		
Hanksville	K33OI-D	11	KBYU-TV		
Hanksville	K34NT-D	13	KSTU		
Hanksville	K35NC-D	14	KJZZ-TV		
Hanna	K31JB-D	2	KUTV		
Hanna	K32HP-D	4	KTVX		
Hanna	K34IW-D	5	KSL-TV		
Hanna	K35IJ-D	7	KUED		
Hanna	K36IL-D	11	KBYU-TV		
Hatch	K15HE-D	2	KUTV		
Hatch	K17HQ-D	4	KTVX		
Hatch	K19GJ-D	5	KSL-TV		
Hatch	K16MB-D	7	KUED		
Hatch	K21KI-D	8	KTTA-LD		
Hatch	K23JX-D	9	KUEN		
Hatch	K18MK-D	11	KBYU-TV		
Hatch	K14QX-D	13	KSTU		
Hatch	K20NA-D	14; 16; 30	K28IT-D		
Heber City	K35EW-D	2	KUTV		
Heber City	K31FP-D	4	KTVX		
Heber City	K27GC-D	5	KSL-TV		
Heber City	K33FX-D	7	KUED		
Heber City	K32MY-D	11	KBYU-TV	(Note: Licensed to Heber City and Midway, Utah.)	
Heber City	K29MC-D	13	KSTU		
Heber City	K15LE-D	14	KJZZ-TV		
Heber City	K26IK-D	30	KUCW		
Helper	K07AAA-D	2	KUTV		
Helper	K26LR-D	4	KTVX		
Helper	K08QG-D	5	KSL-TV		
Helper	K09ZV-D	7	KUED		
Helper	K10RN-D	9	KUEN		
Helper	K11XK-D	11	KBYU-TV		
Helper	K12XI-D	13	KSTU		
Helper	K13AAO-D	14	KJZZ-TV		
Helper	K25PM-D	16	KUPX-TV		
Helper	K27NQ-D	30	KUCW		
Henefer	K31OD-D	2	KUTV		
Henefer	K28OU-D	4	KTVX		
Henefer	K34OM-D	5	KSL-TV		
Henefer	K32IS-D	7	KUED		
Henefer	K30PC-D	11	KBYU-TV	(Note: Licensed to Henefer and Echo, Utah.)	
Henefer	K33LV-D	13	KSTU		
Henefer	K36OW-D	14	KJZZ-TV		
Henefer	K29FY-D	30	KUCW		
Henrieville	K14RH-D	2	KUTV		
Henrieville	K15LC-D	4	KTVX		
Henrieville	K16MH-D	5	KSL-TV		
Henrieville	K17NB-D	7	KUED		
Henrieville	K22MX-D	8	KTTA-LD		
Henrieville	K18ML-D	9	KUEN		
Henrieville	K19LL-D	11	KBYU-TV		
Henrieville	K20MY-D	13	KSTU		
Henrieville	K21NC-D	14; 16; 30	K28IT-D		
Hildale	K08PC-D	2	KUTV		
Hildale	K09SU-D	4	KTVX		
Hildale	K34CX-D	4	KTVX	(Note: Licensed to Apple Valley, Utah.)	
Hildale	K11QQ-D	5	KSL-TV		
Hildale	K21IL-D	7	KUED		
Hildale	K16II-D	7	KUED		
Hildale	K17JK-D	9	KUEN	(Note: Licensed to Cane Beds, Arizona and Hildale, Utah.)	
Huntington	K36PG-D	2	KUTV		
Huntington	K35OE-D	4	KTVX		
Huntington	K34PI-D	5	KSL-TV		
Huntington	K33PP-D	7	KUED		
Huntington	K27KE-D	8	KCSG		
Huntington	K32NJ-D	9	KUEN		
Huntington	K31OU-D	11	KBYU-TV		
Huntington	K30PS-D	13	KSTU		
Huntington	K28KR-D	16	KUPX-TV		
Huntington	K29IZ-D	30	KUCW		
Huntsville	K25IX-D	2	KUTV		
Huntsville	K17IP-D	4	KTVX		
Huntsville	K23IC-D	5	KSL-TV		
Huntsville	K35GG-D	7	KUED		
Huntsville	K28JK-D	13	KSTU	(Note: Licensed to Huntsville and Liberty, Utah.)	
Huntsville	K19LR-D	14	KJZZ-TV		
Kamas–Woodland	K07ZX-D	2	KUTV		
Kamas–Woodland	K08QD-D	4	KTVX		
Kamas–Woodland	K09ZR-D	5	KSL-TV		
Kamas–Woodland	K10RJ-D	7	KUED		
Kamas–Woodland	K11XF-D	11	KBYU-TV		
Kamas–Woodland	K13AAJ-D	13	KSTU		
Kamas–Woodland	K12XE-D	14	KJZZ-TV		
Kanab	K26NY-D	2	KUTV		
Kanab	K32DC-D	4	KTVX		
Kanab	K27JV-D	5	KSL-TV		
Kanab	K29MH-D	7	KUED		
Kanab	K34OP-D	8	KTTA-LD		
Kanab	K30PD-D	9	KUEN		
Kanab	K31OF-D	11	KBYU-TV		
Kanab	K33NT-D	13	KSTU		
Kanab	K28IT-D	14; 16; 30	KJZZ-TV; KUPX-TV; KUCW		
Kanarraville	K02KN-D	2	KUTV		
Kanarraville	K24MY-D	2	KUTV		
Kanarraville	K22NB-D	4	KTVX		
Kanarraville	K23OA-D	5	KSL-TV		
Kanarraville	K29ML-D	7	KUED	(Note: Licensed to Kanarraville and New Harmony, Utah.)	
Kanarraville	K26NZ-D	9	KUEN		
Kanarraville	K36PA-D	13	KSTU		
Kanarraville	K35NP-D	14	KJZZ-TV		
Kanarraville	K30PK-D	16	KUPX-TV		
Kanarraville	K33KF-D	16	KUPX-TV		
Kanarraville	K28PE-D	30	KUCW		
Koosharem	K14RD-D	2	KUTV		
Koosharem	K15KZ-D	4	KTVX		
Koosharem	K16MF-D	5	KSL-TV		
Koosharem	K17ND-D	7	KUED		
Koosharem	K18MN-D	9	KUEN		
Koosharem	K19LF-D	11	KBYU-TV		
Koosharem	K20MV-D	13	KSTU		
Koosharem	K21MZ-D	14	KJZZ-TV		
Laketown	K14RM-D	2	KUTV		
Laketown	K10LM-D	4	KTVX		
Laketown	K12MI-D	5	KSL-TV		
Laketown	K08PW-D	7	KUED		
Laketown	K21NH-D	9	KUEN		
Laketown	K16MK-D	11	KBYU-TV		
Leamington	K19MA-D	2	KUTV		
Leamington	K20NM-D	4	KTVX		
Leamington	K21NO-D	5	KSL-TV		
Leamington	K18MW-D	7	KUED		
Leamington	K16MT-D	8	KCSG		
Leamington	K09PF-D	9	KUEN		
Leamington	K14RP-D	11	KBYU-TV		
Leamington	K15LL-D	13	KSTU		
Leamington	K12QY-D	16	KUPX-TV		
Leamington	K09YW-D	24	K24NA-D		
Leamington	K17NN-D	30	KUCW		
Leamington	K10QR-D	32	KUTH-DT		
Logan	K34OI-D	2	KUTV		
Logan	K30OY-D	4	KTVX		
Logan	K20NC-D	5	KSL-TV		
Logan	K32MW-D	7	KUED		
Logan	K22MH-D	8	KCSG		
Logan	K36OR-D	9	KUEN		
Logan	K17II-D	10	KULX-CD		
Logan	K11XG-D	11	KBYU-TV		
Logan	K28OS-D	13	KSTU		
Logan	K18DL-D	14	KJZZ-TV		
Logan	KUTO-LD	15	KBYU-TV		
Long Valley Junction	K07ZT-D	2	KUTV		
Long Valley Junction	K08PX-D	4	KTVX		
Long Valley Junction	K04RU-D	5	KSL-TV		
Long Valley Junction	K09ZK-D	7	KUED		
Long Valley Junction	K10RF-D	9	KUEN		
Long Valley Junction	K11XB-D	11	KBYU-TV		
Long Valley Junction	K12WZ-D	13	KSTU		
Long Valley Junction	K13AAD-D	14	KJZZ-TV		
Manila	K30LY-D	2	KUTV		
Manila	K31JP-D	4	KTVX		
Manila	K32IA-D	5	KSL-TV		
Manila	K34JD-D	7	KUED		
Manila	K35KL-D	9	KUEN		
Manila	K36LE-D	11	KBYU-TV		
Manila	K33PQ-D	13	KSTU		
Manila	K29MX-D	14	KJZZ-TV		
Manila	K28PT-D	30	KUCW		
Manti	K28JN-D	2	KUTV		
Manti	K34OE-D	4	KTVX		
Manti	K26IH-D	5	KSL-TV		
Manti	K33FT-D	7	KUED		
Manti	KMTI-LD	8	KKTA-LD		
Manti	K27HR-D	9	KUEN		
Manti	K31FN-D	11	KBYU-TV		
Manti	K29EM-D	13	KSTU		
Manti	K25GS-D	14	KJZZ-TV		
Manti	K30KJ-D	16	KUPX-TV		
Manti	K36OI-D	30	KUCW		
Marysvale	K07ZW-D	2	KUTV		
Marysvale	K24MQ-D	4	KTVX		
Marysvale	K09ZQ-D	5	KSL-TV		
Marysvale	K10RI-D	7	KUED		
Marysvale	KSVC-LD	8	KTTA-LD		
Marysvale	K11XE-D	9	KUEN		
Marysvale	K13AAI-D	13	KSTU		
Marysvale	K26NW-D	14	KJZZ-TV		
Mayfield	K16HV-D	2	KUTV		
Mayfield	K17JE-D	4	KTVX		
Mayfield	K18IU-D	5	KSL-TV		
Mayfield	K14RJ-D	7	KUED		
Mayfield	K23NT-D	8	KTTA-LD		
Mayfield	K19LN-D	9	KUEN		
Mayfield	K20MZ-D	11	KBYU-TV		
Mayfield	K15CD-D	13	KSTU		
Mayfield	K21ND-D	14	KJZZ-TV		
Mayfield	K22IX-D	30	KUCW		
Mexican Hat	K19IG-D	2	KUTV		
Mexican Hat	K23MT-D	4	KTVX		
Mexican Hat	K15JV-D	5	KSL-TV		
Mexican Hat	K17JH-D	5	KSL-TV		
Mexican Hat	K14QC-D	7	KUED		
Mexican Hat	K22IG-D	7	KUED		
Mexican Hat	K20KC-D	9	KUEN		
Mexican Hat	K16HK-D	11	KBYU-TV		
Mexican Hat	K18IB-D	13	KSTU		
Mexican Hat	K21IW-D	14	KJZZ-TV		
Milford	K22FS-D	2	KUTV	(Note: Licensed to Beaver, Utah.)	
Milford	K18FU-D	4	KTVX	(Note: Licensed to Rural Beaver County, Utah.)	
Milford	K23KO-D	5	KSL-TV		
Milford	K24FE-D	5	KSL-TV		
Milford	K20GH-D	7	KUED		
Milford	K17HX-D	8	KCSG	(Note: Licensed to Minersville, Utah.)	
Milford	K16BO-D	9	KUEN		
Milford	K25PB-D	11	KBYU-TV	(Note: Licensed to Rural Iron, Utah.)	
Milford	K19GS-D	12	KMYU	(Note: Licensed to Rural Beaver, Utah.)	
Milford	K15FQ-D	13	KSTU		
Milford	K26EA-D	14	KJZZ-TV		
Milford	K21KL-D	16	KUPX-TV		
Milford	K27NJ-D	30	KUCW		
Montezuma Creek–Aneth	K18MR-D	2	KUTV		
Montezuma Creek–Aneth	K19HU-D	4	KTVX		
Montezuma Creek–Aneth	K16MQ-D	5	KSL-TV		
Montezuma Creek–Aneth	K17IH-D	7	KUED		
Montezuma Creek–Aneth	K15HM-D	11	KBYU-TV		
Montezuma Creek–Aneth	K23JC-D	13	KSTU		
Montezuma Creek–Aneth	K21IX-D	30	KUCW		
Morgan	K30JB-D	2	KUTV		
Morgan	K31IU-D	4	KTVX		
Morgan	K32HK-D	5	KSL-TV		
Morgan	K27NH-D	7	KUED		
Morgan	K28JL-D	13	KSTU		
Mount Pleasant	K15HG-D	2	KUTV		
Mount Pleasant	K19GN-D	4	KTVX		
Mount Pleasant	K21IC-D	5	KSL-TV		
Mount Pleasant	K22FW-D	7	KUED		
Mount Pleasant	K16IB-D	9	KUEN		
Mount Pleasant	K14QZ-D	11	KBYU-TV		
Mount Pleasant	K23NR-D	13	KSTU		
Mount Pleasant	K20MT-D	14	KJZZ-TV		
Mount Pleasant	K18IV-D	16	KUPX-TV		
Mount Pleasant	K17JD-D	30	KUCW		
Navajo Mountain	K22IE-D	2	KUTV		
Navajo Mountain	K20JE-D	4	KTVX		
Navajo Mountain	K17IE-D	5	KSL-TV		
Navajo Mountain	K19HA-D	7	KUED		
Navajo Mountain	K16HI-D	11	KBYU-TV		
Navajo Mountain	K18HZ-D	13	KSTU		
Navajo Mountain	K21IU-D	14	KJZZ-TV		
Nephi	K14RI-D	2	KUTV		
Nephi	K21JZ-D	4	KTVX		
Nephi	K16MI-D	5	KSL-TV		
Nephi	K31LC-D	7	KUED		
Nephi	K33KH-D	9	KUEN		
Nephi	K18MJ-D	11	KBYU-TV		
Nephi	K22OO-D	13	KSTU		
Nephi	K20OB-D	14	KJZZ-TV		
Nephi	K26PK-D	16	KUPX-TV		
Nephi	K25NN-D	30	KUCW		
Oljeto	K22IF-D	2	KUTV		
Oljeto	K20JF-D	4	KTVX		
Oljeto	K17IF-D	5	KSL-TV		
Oljeto	K19HB-D	7	KUED		
Oljeto	K16HJ-D	11	KBYU-TV		
Oljeto	K18IA-D	13	KSTU		
Oljeto	K21IV-D	14	KJZZ-TV		
Orangeville	K15LQ-D	2	KUTV		
Orangeville	K16MZ-D	4	KTVX		
Orangeville	K17NQ-D	5	KSL-TV		
Orangeville	K18MX-D	7	KUED		
Orangeville	K19MD-D	9	KUEN		
Orangeville	K20NQ-D	11	KBYU-TV		
Orangeville	K21NP-D	13	KSTU		
Orangeville	K22NF-D	14	KJZZ-TV		
Orangeville	K23OH-D	16	KUPX-TV		
Orangeville	K28PR-D	16	KUPX-TV	(Note: Licensed to Castle Dale, Utah.)	
Orangeville	K24ND-D	30	KUCW		
Orderville	K19KQ-D	2	KUTV		
Orderville	K20MF-D	4	KTVX		
Orderville	K24LX-D	5	KSL-TV		
Orderville	K22LW-D	7	KUED		
Orderville	K23NK-D	8	KTTA-LD		
Orderville	K15IA-D	9	KUEN		
Orderville	K17JC-D	11	KBYU-TV		
Orderville	K16BT-D	13	KSTU		
Orderville	K18ET-D	14; 16; 30	K28IT-D		
Panguitch	K14RE-D	2	KUTV		
Panguitch	K15LA-D	4	KTVX		
Panguitch	K16MG-D	5	KSL-TV		
Panguitch	K17NA-D	7	KUED		
Panguitch	K22MW-D	8	KTTA-LD		
Panguitch	K18MG-D	9	KUEN		
Panguitch	K19LK-D	11	KBYU-TV		
Panguitch	K20MX-D	13	KSTU		
Panguitch	K21NE-D	14	KJZZ-TV		
Park City	K15FL-D	2	KUTV		
Park City	K31FQ-D	4	KTVX		
Park City	K27GD-D	5	KSL-TV		
Park City	K34OJ-D	7	KUED		
Park City	K32MK-D	9	KUEN		
Park City	KULU-LD	10	KULX-CD		
Park City	K35OP-D	13	KSTU		
Park City	K29II-D	14	KJZZ-TV		
Park City	K33FY-D	30	KUCW		
Parowan	K32AG-D	2	KUTV		
Parowan	K34AG-D	4	KTVX		
Parowan	K36AI-D	5	KSL-TV		
Parowan	K28OW-D	7	KUED		
Parowan	K25PD-D	8	KCSG		
Parowan	K27NK-D	9	KUEN	(Note: Licensed to Parowan and Enoch, Utah.)	
Parowan	K29MI-D	11	KBYU-TV		
Parowan	K35NT-D	12	KMYU		
Parowan	K30PE-D	13	KSTU		
Parowan	K31OG-D	14	KJZZ-TV		
Parowan	K26OA-D	16	KUPX-TV	(Note: Licensed to Parowan, Enoch and Paragonah, Utah.)	
Parowan	K33OZ-D	30	KUCW		
Peoa	K33JG-D	2	KUTV		
Peoa	K14PF-D	4	KTVX		
Peoa	K35IS-D	5	KSL-TV		
Peoa	K31NK-D	7	KUED	(Note: Licensed to Peoa and Oakley, Utah.)	
Peoa	K22DM-D	9	KUEN		
Peoa	K36PK-D	13	KSTU		
Peoa	K29MF-D	30	KUCW		
Pine Valley	K11OO-D	4	KTVX		
Pine Valley	K17NL-D	7	KUED		
Pine Valley	K15LJ-D	11	KBYU-TV		
Price	K07ZZ-D	2	KUTV	(Note: Licensed to East Price, Utah.)	
Price	K08QF-D	4	KTVX		
Price	K09ZU-D	5	KSL-TV		
Price	K16NA-D	5	KSL-TV		
Price	K10RL-D	7	KUED		
Price	K11XM-D	9	KUEN		
Price	K12XH-D	11	KBYU-TV		
Price	K13AAP-D	13	KSTU		
Price	K25OZ-D	14	KJZZ-TV		
Price	K26OI-D	16	KUPX-TV		
Price	K27NW-D	30	KUCW		
Randolph	K35NN-D	2	KUTV	(Note: Licensed to Randolph and Woodruff, Utah.)	
Randolph	K34FR-D	4	KTVX		
Randolph	K36FS-D	5	KSL-TV		
Randolph	K31OB-D	7	KUED		
Randolph	K33PS-D	9	KUEN		
Randolph	K28PU-D	11	KBYU-TV		
Randolph	K30JG-D	13	KSTU		
Randolph	K32MX-D	14	KJZZ-TV		
Randolph	K29MY-D	30	KUCW		
Richfield	K14RC-D	2	KUTV		
Richfield	K15KY-D	4	KTVX		
Richfield	K16ME-D	5	KSL-TV		
Richfield	K17MV-D	9	KUEN		
Richfield	K18ME-D	11	KBYU-TV		
Richfield	K20MS-D	13	KSTU		
Richfield	K21MY-D	14	KJZZ-TV		
Richfield	K23NU-D	16	KUPX-TV		
Richfield	K22MP-D	30	KUCW		
Rockville	K31JX-D	2	KUTV		
Rockville	K05AR-D	5	KSL-TV		
Rockville	K33JW-D	7	KUED		
Rockville	K29MJ-D	11	KBYU-TV		
Roosevelt	K07AAB-D	2	KUTV		
Roosevelt	K08QH-D	4	KTVX		
Roosevelt	K09ZW-D	5	KSL-TV		
Roosevelt	K10RO-D	7	KUED		
Roosevelt	K11XL-D	9	KUEN		
Roosevelt	K12XG-D	11	KBYU-TV		
Roosevelt	K13AAN-D	13	KSTU		
Roosevelt	K24NC-D	14	KJZZ-TV		
Roosevelt	K25PH-D	16	KUPX-TV		
Roosevelt	K26OF-D	30	KUCW		
Rural Juab	K08QA-D	2	KUTV		
Rural Juab	K12XD-D	4	KTVX	(Note: Licensed to Aurora, Utah.)	
Rural Juab	K10RG-D	5	KSL-TV		
Rural Juab	K11XD-D	7	KUED		
Rural Juab	K07ZE-D	8	KTTA-LD		
Rural Juab	K09ZO-D	9	KUEN	(Note: Licensed to Juab, Utah.)	
Rural Juab	K14PA-D	13	KSTU		
Rural Juab	K13OG-D	13	KSTU		
Rural Juab	K18GX-D	16	KUPX-TV		
Salina	K07ZV-D	2	KUTV	(Note: Licensed to Salina and Sigurd, Utah.)	
Salina	K08QC-D	4	KTVX		
Salina	K09ZP-D	5	KSL-TV		
Salina	K10RH-D	7	KUED	(Note: Licensed to Salina and Redmond, Utah.)	
Salina	K11XC-D	9	KUEN		
Salina	K12XC-D	11	KBYU-TV		
Salina	K13AAH-D	13	KSTU		
Salina	K06QS-D	14	KJZZ-TV		
Salina	K04RV-D	16	KUPX-TV		
Salina	K05NF-D	30	KUCW		
Salt Lake City	KCSG-LD	8	K08QL-D		
Salt Lake City	KULX-CD	10	KTMW		
Salt Lake City	KEJT-CD	50	KTMW		
Samak	K14RL-D	2	KUTV		
Samak	K32MZ-D	4	KTVX		
Samak	K33OX-D	5	KSL-TV		
Samak	K34ON-D	7	KUED		
Samak	K29IM-D	11	KBYU-TV		
Samak	K28JS-D	13	KSTU		
Samak	K30KC-D	14	KJZZ-TV		
Samak	K36OX-D	30	KUCW		
Scipio	K22NC-D	2	KUTV		
Scipio	K18MV-D	4	KTVX	(Note: Licensed to Scipio and Holden, Utah.)	
Scipio	K21NN-D	5	KSL-TV		
Scipio	K20NN-D	9	KUEN		
Scipio	K17NM-D	11	KBYU-TV		
Scipio	K15LK-D	13	KSTU		
Scipio	K23OD-D	16	KUPX-TV		
Scipio	K19LY-D	24	K24NA-D		
Scipio	K14RN-D	30	KUCW		
Scipio	K16MU-D	32	KUTH-DT		
Scofield	K31JN-D	2	KUTV		
Scofield	K33JI-D	4	KTVX		
Scofield	K32IZ-D	5	KSL-TV		
Scofield	K35JJ-D	7	KUED		
Scofield	K34PF-D	9	KUEN		
Scofield	K30PO-D	11	KBYU-TV		
Scofield	K29MT-D	13	KSTU		
Scofield	K28PK-D	14	KJZZ-TV		
Scofield	K27NV-D	30	KUCW		
Sevier County	K14QY-D	2	KUTV		
Sevier County	K15KT-D	4	KTVX		
Sevier County	K16MC-D	5	KSL-TV		
Sevier County	K17MU-D	7	KUED		
Sevier County	K18MM-D	9	KUEN		
Sevier County	K19LO-D	11	KBYU-TV		
Sevier County	K20MW-D	13	KSTU		
Sevier County	K21NB-D	14	KJZZ-TV		
Spring Glen	K31MC-D	2	KUTV		
Spring Glen	K34PD-D	4	KTVX		
Spring Glen	K32NF-D	5	KSL-TV		
Spring Glen	K14RU-D	7	KUED		
Spring Glen	K30PM-D	9	KUEN	(Note: Licensed to Price, Utah.)	
Spring Glen	K29MV-D	11	KBYU-TV		
Spring Glen	K36JW-D	14	KJZZ-TV		
Spring Glen	K33KI-D	16	KUPX-TV		
Spring Glen	K28PG-D	30	KUCW		
St. George	K10RP-D	2	KUTV	(Note: Licensed to Santa Clara, Utah.)	
St. George	K23NY-D	4	KTVX		
St. George	K28EA-D	4	KTVX	(Note: Licensed to Washington, Utah.)	
St. George	K20GJ-D	5	KSL-TV	(Note: Licensed to Bloomington, Utah.)	
St. George	K35FS-D	5	KSL-TV		
St. George	K30OL-D	7	KUED		
St. George	K16DS-D	8	KCSG		
St. George	K27MQ-D	8	KCSG		
St. George	K19LV-D	9	KUEN		
St. George	K29OJ-D	9	KUEN		
St. George	K14RO-D	11	KBYU-TV		
St. George	K36FT-D	11	KBYU-TV		
St. George	KKRP-LD	13	KSTU		
St. George	K25PA-D	13	KSTU		
St. George	KVBT-LD	13	KSTU		
St. George	K24CY-D	14	KJZZ-TV		
St. George	K34OV-D	14	KJZZ-TV		
St. George	K33PC-D	30	KUCW		
St. George	K13AAK-D	30	KUCW		
St. George	KUWB-LD	30	KUCW		
Summit County	K20ND-D	2	KUTV		
Summit County	K24MU-D	4	KTVX		
Summit County	K23NV-D	5	KSL-TV		
Summit County	K21MU-D	7	KUED		
Summit County	K22DM-D	9	KUEN		
Summit County	KULU-LD	10	KULX-CD		
Summit County	K17DG-D	11	KBYU-TV		
Summit County	K25OY-D	13	KSTU		
Summit County	K19DU-D	14	KJZZ-TV		
Summit County	K18KO-D	30	KUCW		
Tabiona	K18JU-D	2	KUTV		
Tabiona	K19EY-D	4	KTVX	(Note: Licensed to Myton, Utah.)	
Tabiona	K21FT-D	5	KSL-TV		
Tabiona	K20NU-D	7	KUED	(Note: Licensed to Tabiona and Myton, Utah.)	
Tabiona	K16MX-D	8	KCSG		
Tabiona	K23FT-D	9	KUEN		
Tabiona	K22NE-D	13	KSTU		
Tabiona	K17DM-D	14	KJZZ-TV		
Tabiona	K15LW-D	16	KUPX-TV	(Note: Licensed to Utahn, Utah.)	
Tabiona	K14LW-D	30	KUCW		
Teasdale	K14RA-D	2	KUTV	(Note: Licensed to Teasdale and Torrey, Utah.)	
Teasdale	K15KU-D	4	KTVX		
Teasdale	K16MD-D	5	KSL-TV		
Teasdale	K17MZ-D	7	KUED	(Note: Licensed to Torrey, Utah.)	
Teasdale	K18MF-D	9	KUEN		
Teasdale	K19LH-D	11	KBYU-TV		
Teasdale	K20MU-D	13	KSTU	(Note: Licensed to Bicknell, Utah.)	
Teasdale	K21NA-D	14	KJZZ-TV	(Note: Licensed to Teasdale and Bicknell, Utah.)	
Teasdale	K22MV-D	16	KUPX-TV		
Toquerville	K11VY-D	2	KUTV		
Toquerville	K31IS-D	4	KTVX		
Toquerville	K07CG-D	5	KSL-TV		
Toquerville	K32NC-D	7	KUED		
Toquerville	K33PD-D	9	KUEN		
Toquerville	K34OT-D	11	KBYU-TV	(Note: Licensed to Toquerville and Leeds, Utah.)	
Tropic	K30OT-D	2	KUTV	(Note: Licensed to Tropic and Cannonville, Utah.)	
Tropic	K32MT-D	4	KTVX		
Tropic	K34OD-D	5	KSL-TV		
Tropic	K35NK-D	7	KUED	(Note: Licensed to Cannonville, Utah.)	
Tropic	K36OM-D	8	KTTA-LD		
Tropic	K31EL-D	9	KUEN		
Tropic	K28OJ-D	11	KBYU-TV		
Tropic	K29GJ-D	13	KSTU		
Tropic	K33HX-D	14; 16; 30	K28IT-D		
Vernal	K29LB-D	2	KUTV		
Vernal	K30KM-D	4	KTVX		
Vernal	K31JL-D	5	KSL-TV		
Vernal	K32HV-D	7	KUED		
Vernal	K33DO-D	9	KUEN		
Vernal	K34JB-D	11	KBYU-TV		
Vernal	K35IQ-D	13	KSTU		
Vernal	K27NO-D	14	KJZZ-TV		
Vernal	K36IQ-D	14	KJZZ-TV		
Vernal	K28PF-D	30	KUCW		
Virgin	K19HQ-D	2	KUTV		
Virgin	K13QK-D	4	KTVX		
Virgin	K08BO-D	5	KSL-TV		
Virgin	K22IP-D	7	KUED		
Virgin	K23JN-D	11	KBYU-TV		
Wanship	K14QS-D	2	KUTV		
Wanship	K36OV-D	4	KTVX		
Wanship	K34OL-D	5	KSL-TV		
Wanship	K28JR-D	7	KUED		
Wanship	K32IU-D	11	KBYU-TV		
Wanship	K29HX-D	13	KSTU		
Wanship	K30KE-D	30	KUCW		
Wendover	K18KC-D	2	KUTV		
Wendover	K20LF-D	5	KSL-TV		
Wendover	K15GZ-D	7	KUED		
Wendover	K21NI-D	9	KUEN		
Wendover	K16MN-D	13	KSTU		

== Defunct ==
- KCBU Price (2003–2009)
- KLOR-TV Provo/Salt Lake City (1958–1960)
- KUSU-TV Logan (1964–1970)
- KVOG-TV, KOET Ogden (1960–1973)
- KWCS-TV Ogden (1960–1971)
