= KUEN =

Television station in Ogden, Utah

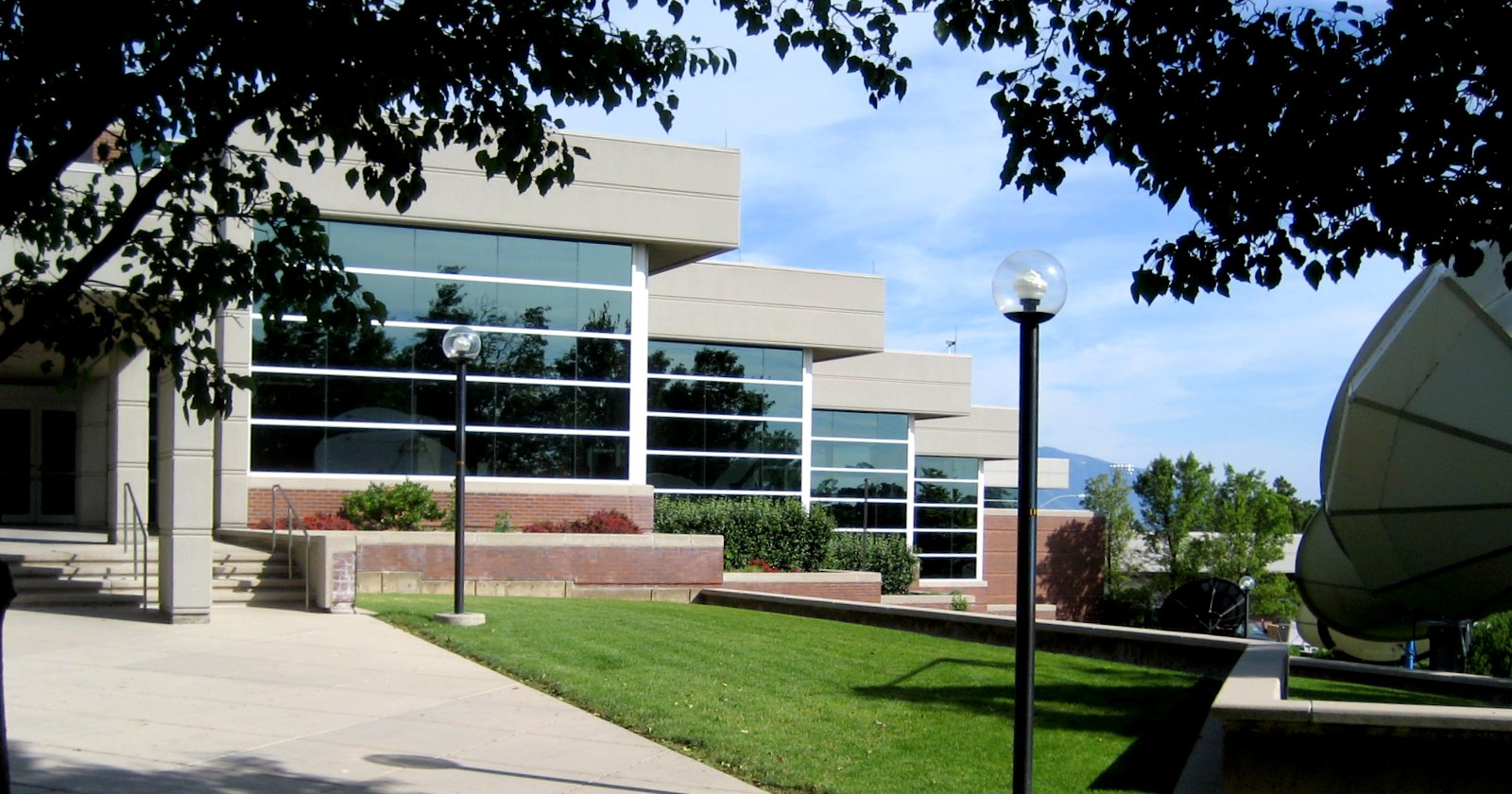
- The Eccles Broadcast Center on the University of Utah campus houses KUEN's broadcast operations
- Ogden–Salt Lake City, Utah; United States
- City: Ogden, Utah
- Channels: Digital: 36 (UHF); Virtual: 9

Programming
- Affiliations: 9.1: PBS Kids; for others, see § Subchannels

Ownership
- Owner: University of Utah
- Sister stations: KUED, KUER-FM

History
- Founded: March 21, 1984
- First air date: December 1, 1986
- Former call signs: KULC (1986–2004)
- Former channel numbers: Analog: 9 (VHF, 1986–2009)
- Former affiliations: Educational independent (1986–2025); First Nations Experience (2025–2026, now on 9.3)
- Call sign meaning: Utah Education Network, former owner

Technical information
- Licensing authority: FCC
- Facility ID: 69582
- ERP: 200 kW
- HAAT: 1,247 m (4,091 ft)
- Transmitter coordinates: 40°39′33″N 112°12′10″W

Links
- Public license information: Public file; LMS
- Website: www.pbsutah.org

KUEN (channel 9) is an educational television station licensed to Ogden, Utah, United States, serving Salt Lake City and the state of Utah. Its main channel broadcasts the PBS Kids 24/7 service. The station is owned by the University of Utah (U of U) alongside KUED (channel 7) and KUER-FM radio and operates from the Eccles Broadcast Center on the U of U campus; its transmitter is located at Farnsworth Peak in the Oquirrh Mountains, southwest of Salt Lake City, and is extended by dozens of broadcast translators across the state.

Channel 9, an educational channel since 1962, had been unused since 1973, when the Ogden school board shut down KOET. Weber State College obtained a construction permit to reactivate channel 9 in 1984, but it lacked funding to construct or operate the station. The permit transferred to the Utah Board of Higher Education in 1985, and the University of Utah was assigned to build and operate channel 9. The station began broadcasting on December 1, 1986, as KULC ("Utah's Learning Channel") with a selection of telecourses for college credit from institutions across the state.

In 1989, the Utah Education Network (UEN) was formed to coordinate this activity and, ultimately, internet connectivity for public schools in Utah. KULC, along with the University of Utah's public broadcasting stations, moved into the Eccles Broadcast Center in 1993. As part of efforts to reinforce its parent's brand, KULC changed its call sign to KUEN in 2004 and became known as UEN-TV. The station offered educational programming, secondary public television programming from independent producers, and a limited amount of local production. In 2025, it dropped this programming to air First Nations Experience after federal funding was stripped from the Corporation for Public Broadcasting. The broadcast licenses for KUEN and translators were transferred to the U of U, which now broadcasts PBS Kids on the station.

== Prior history of channel 9 in Ogden ==
Channel 9 in Ogden had originally been assigned as a commercial channel and went on the air as KVOG-TV on December 5, 1960. It operated as an independent station until the owner, Arch G. Webb, opted to exit the television business. The Ogden city school system, which had long planned educational television broadcasts, agreed to acquire KVOG-TV in January 1962. Upon acquiring KVOG-TV at a final cost of $155,500, the board changed the call sign to KOET, for "Ogden Educational Television", and converted the license to noncommercial operation.

As early as 1967, Ogden school officials wanted to sell KOET, one of them believing it would save the district money, but found that the noncommercial designation of the channel hindered their efforts. James Lavenstein agreed to buy KOET with the intention of converting it back to a commercial station; the sale application stalled at the Federal Communications Commission (FCC), which denied it in 1970 because of the recent or discussed closure of other educational stations in northern Utah, such as Logan's short-lived KUSU-TV and the Weber County school system's KWCS-TV. Commercial broadcasters, resisting competition, said that a fourth commercial station in Salt Lake would hinder the development of UHF broadcasting. KOET and KWCS-TV merged operations in 1971, but after Weber County withdrew from the partnership in 1973, the station closed. Ogden school leaders regretted changing the channel to noncommercial use. KOET was deleted by the FCC in February 1975.

== History ==
=== Weber State plans ===
Momentum for putting channel 9 to use again started with Weber State College in Ogden. By early 1982, it was preparing an application to the FCC for channel 9, which it hoped would be a laboratory for students learning broadcast journalism and a station providing local programming. Under an agreement with the Standard Corporation, parent of the Ogden Standard-Examiner and Salt Lake City TV station KUTV, Weber State would receive financial and facilities assistance. By November 1983, a second application had been received for the channel from Way of the Cross of Utah, a group based in Lexington, Kentucky.

Weber State received the construction permit in 1984; the college had already proposed building a transmitter on Mount Vision in the Oquirrh Mountains, southwest of Salt Lake City. In spite of corporate support and a federal grant, however, Weber State proved unable to raise the funds necessary to build channel 9. The federal grant required a local match, which was not feasible. One proposal that could have provided the funding came from KSTU (channel 20), which proposed swapping channels to move KSTU to channel 9 and the Weber State station to channel 20. However, channel swaps between public VHF and commercial UHF stations were controversial, leading college administrators to deny the offer. In addition, there was no source of funding for recurring expenses.

=== Construction and operation ===
As a result of Weber State's financial inability to build channel 9 and a desire to prevent the channel from being lost to the state, on May 18, 1985, the Utah State Board of Regents—the governing body for the state's higher education institutions—approved a plan to transfer the channel 9 construction permit to a consortium of institutions. Under the consortium, Channel 9 would share facilities and space with KUED (Channel 7), Utah's primary public television station, at the University of Utah.

KULC ("Utah's Learning Channel") began broadcasting on December 1, 1986. It originally broadcast for four hours a day on weekdays only before debuting a regular schedule in January 1987. The statewide microwave transmission system enabled institutions across the state to originate telecourses for KULC, including the University of Utah, Utah State University, Weber State College, Southern Utah State College, and Snow College. Course offerings ranged from the coursework for a pilot's license and electrical engineering to introductory American history and geology. The station's facilities in Gardner Hall on the University of Utah campus were described by station coordinator Don Bullen as "the size of a closet". The Utah Education Network was formed by the state in 1989 as a successor to the prior State Educational Telecom Operations Center (SETOC). Ground was broken on the larger Eccles Broadcast Center in 1989; KUED, KUER-FM, and KULC began broadcasting from the site in 1993. The station expanded its reach beyond the Wasatch Front with the installation of new translators in areas such as Richfield and St. George and Cedar City. Concomitant with this expansion, enrollment in KULC telecourses increased from 965 students in 1988 to 4,336 in 1993.

In 2000, KULC began 24-hour broadcasting, which allowed for overnight rebroadcasts of programs for K–12 schools as well as reairs of popular adult education programs. By this time, the station also aired children's programs and professional development programming for teachers, such as Critical Issues in School Reform and Principles for Principals. In 2001, an expansion was built to the Eccles Broadcast Center to accommodate the burgeoning Utah Education Network operation. The station changed call signs to KUEN on September 10, 2004, as part of a campaign to reinforce the UEN brand for its parent organization.

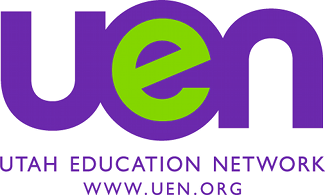
Logo of the Utah Education Network

In 2020, the Corporation for Public Broadcasting (CPB) ordered KUEN to repay more than $1.3 million in Community Service Grants it had received for the 2017–2018 and 2018–2019 fiscal years because the Utah Education Network had overstated its non-federal financial support by $11.5 million over the two-year period. For CPB purposes, KUEN and the services to schools of the Utah Education Network, part of the Utah Education and Telehealth Network, were combined. In fiscal year 2023, the Utah Education Network had revenue of $43.1 million, mostly from state appropriations and CPB grants, and expenses of $45.1 million.

UEN-TV's schedule consisted primarily of college-credit telecourses and instructional and educational programs for a variety of audiences. Local productions included Art Connection, SciTech Now, and PDTV.

=== Transfer to the University of Utah ===
In 2025, Congress stripped federal funding from the Corporation for Public Broadcasting. As a result, UEN-TV ceased broadcasting its educational program service. A message on its website indicated that, as a temporary measure, KUEN would broadcast programming from First Nations Experience (FNX) on its main subchannel. The Utah Board of Higher Education filed on November 25, 2025, to transfer KUEN's broadcast license and those of its dependent translators to the University of Utah, which is wholly owned by the board. The commission approved the transaction on December 4. The university announced its intention to broadcast PBS Kids from KUEN and did so beginning April 1, 2026.

== Technical information ==
=== Subchannels ===
The KUEN transmitter is on Farnsworth Peak. Its signal is multiplexed:

Subchannels of KUEN
Subchannel	Res.	Short name	Programming
9.1	1080i	KUEN-HD	PBS Kids
9.2	480i	KUEN-SD	[Blank]
9.3	480i	FNX	First Nations Experience
9.4	480i	NHK	NHK World-Japan
9.91	Audio only	KUER-FM	KUER-FM

=== Analog-to-digital conversion ===
KUEN shut down its analog signal, over VHF channel 9, on June 12, 2009, as part of the federally mandated transition from analog to digital television. The station's digital signal remained on its pre-transition UHF channel 36. Whereas KUEN's analog signal was located on Mount Vision, KUED and KUEN formed part of the DTV Utah consortium that built a shared digital transmission facility on Farnsworth Peak in 1999.

=== Translators ===
KUEN is rebroadcast on the following translators:

- Leamington: K08PF-D
- Blanding–Monticello: K09ZN-D
- Juab: K09ZO-D
- Beaver: K09ZT-D
- Long Valley Junction: K10RF-D
- Helper: K10RN-D
- Salina–Redmond: K11XC-D
- Marysvale: K11XE-D
- Roosevelt, etc.: K11XL-D
- East Price: K11XM-D
- Preston, ID: K14OA-D
- Orderville: K15IA-D
- Rural Carbon County: K15LP-D
- Milford, etc.: K16BO-D
- Mount Pleasant: K16IB-D
- Cane Beds, AZ–Hildale: K17JK-D
- Richfield, etc.: K17MV-D
- Torrey, etc.: K18MF-D
- Panguitch: K18MG-D
- Henrieville: K18ML-D
- Rural Sevier County: K18MM-D
- Koosharem: K18MN-D
- Cedar City: K18MT-D
- Green River: K19ID-D
- Orangeville: K19MD-D
- Rural Garfield County: K19LG-D
- Mayfield: K19LN-D
- St. George: K19LV-D
- Mexican Hat: K20KC-D
- Scipio: K20NN-D
- Laketown, etc.: K21NH-D
- Wendover: K21NI-D
- Rural Summit County: K22DM-D
- Circleville: K22MU-D
- Myton: K23FT-D
- Hatch: K23JX-D
- Fishlake Resort: K25LH-D
- Kanarraville–New Harmony: K26NZ-D
- Fillmore, etc.: K26OB-D
- Manti–Ephraim: K27HR-D
- Fountain Green: K27NG-D
- Parowan–Enoch, etc.: K27NK-D
- Delta, etc.: K27NM-D
- Emery: K28KN-D
- Boulder: K28OP-D
- Caineville: K28OR-D
- Fremont: K29IV-D
- Kanab: K30PD-D
- Beryl–Newcastle–Modena: K30PJ-D
- Price: K30PM-D
- Tropic, etc.: K31EL-D
- Alton: K31KP-D
- Washington, etc.: K32MH-D
- Park City: K32MK-D
- Hanksville: K32MU-D
- Antimony: K32MV-D
- Green River: K32NG-D
- Ferron: K32NH-D
- Huntington: K32NJ-D
- Vernal: K33DO-D
- Nephi: K33KH-D
- Toquerville–Hurricane: K33PD-D
- Randolph: K33PS-D
- Duchesne: K34FV-D
- Escalante: K34NY-D
- Scofield: K34PF-D
- Manila, etc.: K35KL-D
- Rural Garfield County, etc.: K35ND-D
- Clear Creek: K36JT-D
- Logan: K36OR-D

== See also ==
- Public broadcasting
- Distance education
