= KSTU =

Television station in Salt Lake City

- Salt Lake City, Utah; United States
- Channels: Digital: 28 (UHF); Virtual: 13
- Branding: Fox 13; Fox 13 News

Programming
- Affiliations: 13.1: Fox; for others, see § Technical information and subchannels

Ownership
- Owner: E. W. Scripps Company; (Scripps Broadcasting Holdings LLC)
- Sister stations: KUPX-TV

History
- First air date: October 24, 1978 (on channel 20) (Note: While the channel 13 license is separate, KSTU moved seamlessly to channel 13 on November 2, 1987. The channel 20 license was later surrendered; a new station, KTMW, began broadcasting a decade later.)
- Former channel number: Analog: 20 (UHF, 1978–1987), 13 (VHF, 1987–2009)
- Former affiliations: Independent (1978–1986)
- Call sign meaning: Springfield Television of Utah, original owners

Technical information
- Licensing authority: FCC
- Facility ID: 22215
- ERP: 350 kW
- HAAT: 1,210 m (3,970 ft)
- Transmitter coordinates: 40°39′32.8″N 112°12′10.8″W

Links
- Public license information: Public file; LMS
- Website: fox13now.com

KSTU (channel 13) is a television station in Salt Lake City, Utah, United States, affiliated with the Fox network. It is owned by the E. W. Scripps Company alongside KUPX-TV (channel 16), an independent station. The two stations share studios on West Amelia Earhart Drive in the northwestern section of Salt Lake City; KSTU's transmitter is located on Farnsworth Peak in the Oquirrh Mountains, southwest of Salt Lake City. More than 80 dependent translators carry its signal throughout Utah and portions of neighboring states.

KSTU went on the air in 1978 as the third attempt at an independent station in the Salt Lake City market. It was by far the most successful to date; it was the first independent in the market to last longer than two years. Broadcasting on channel 20, it was also the first commercial UHF outlet in the state. It was built by and named for its Massachusetts-based founding owner, Springfield Television. Adams Communications acquired KSTU in 1984 when it merged with Springfield Television. Channel 20 affiliated with Fox at its launch in 1986.

While KSTU was starting on channel 20, a decade-long proceeding began to assign VHF channel 13, which had been made available in Salt Lake City in 1980. Eight applicants submitted bids; Mountain West Television, a consortium of mostly local partners, emerged with the construction permit after buying out its competitors' interests. In what the partners later described as coerced action coordinated by their legal counsel and financial backers, the company bought KSTU's intellectual property and moved it to channel 13 in November 1987 instead of building and staffing its own station.

Between 1989 and 2007, KSTU was a Fox owned-and-operated station. In 1991, the station began producing local newscasts, which Fox and subsequent owners would use as the foundation for an emphasis on news. After Fox spun off its smaller owned-and-operated stations in 2007, KSTU has been owned in succession by Local TV LLC, Tribune Media, and Scripps. KSTU broadcasts the Scripps-owned Ion Television as a subchannel.

== History ==
What would become the Salt Lake City market had an ignominious history with independent television before KSTU. Two attempts to operate independent stations on the VHF band in the late 1950s and early 1960s both fell through. KLOR-TV signed on in 1958 from Provo. However, poor transmitter site selection hindered reception for many viewers in the Wasatch Front whose antennas were aimed at the Oquirrh Mountains. It signed off in 1960, having been placed in bankruptcy, and the license was sold to Brigham Young University for reactivation as KBYU-TV. At the other end of the Wasatch Front, in Ogden, KVOG-TV began on channel 9 in 1960 but was sold to the Ogden city school board in 1962 and converted to educational use as KOET, which ceased broadcasting in 1973. During KOET's life, the Federal Communications Commission (FCC) blocked an attempt by the school board to sell the station back to a buyer to be reverted to commercial use because of the effects such a reclassification would have on the development of UHF, then an agency priority, and on educational broadcasting in northern Utah.

=== The channel 20 years ===
Channel 20 was allocated to Salt Lake City in 1952, but there was no interest in the channel until a 1967 application was made by the Great Desert Broadcasting Company, which was never granted.

In September 1977, Springfield, Massachusetts–based Springfield Television, whose other holdings were NBC-affiliated flagship WWLP in Springfield and ABC affiliate WKEF in Dayton, Ohio, applied to the FCC for channel 20. There had been a previous full-service UHF educational station in the state: KWCS-TV (channel 18) in Ogden, owned by the Weber County school system. The Springfield Television application came at a time when the Salt Lake market appeared "ripe" for a fourth station. By this time, two other events were occurring: another attempt was being made to restore channel 9 at Ogden to commercial status, and the FCC was also considering adding channel 13 to Salt Lake City.

In March 1978, the FCC granted a construction permit to Springfield Television, which had previously announced that channel 20 would be Utah's only independent station and only commercial UHF outlet. Office space in the Salt Lake International Center, west of the airport, was constructed, KSTU began broadcasting on October 24, 1978, with a programming lineup typical of independent stations and broadcasting from a transmitter site leased from KSL-TV in the Oquirrh Mountains. As the first UHF station in Utah in five years and the first-ever UHF outlet serving the full Salt Lake market, station promotions prior to the launch explained to viewers how to tune in: "Ever wonder what that other dial is for? It's for 'U'!" Almost immediately, Springfield Television also began building translators of its own in order to match the total coverage area of the existing local stations. The first KSTU-owned translator, on Levan Peak serving Aurora, went into service in September 1979. Even though Washington County rejected KSTU's initial proposal when the station did not offer funding to connect KSTU into the county translator network, new translators continued to come into service for several years in areas such as Orangeville, Cedar City, and Vernal.

Springfield Television reached an agreement to sell its entire group to Adams Communications in 1983 for $47.3 million. The Adams offer met the conditions for Springfield to sell: the stations were sold together, the current management was retained, and the price was agreeable. The deal was closed in 1984. On October 9, 1986, the station became a charter affiliate of the new Fox network. However, like most early Fox affiliates, the station was still mostly programmed as an independent due to Fox's limited output.

=== Channel 13 drops in ===
When the FCC allocated television channels, the station spacing guidelines meant that inserting channel 13 in Salt Lake City was not possible. In 1968, the FCC denied a petition by Salt Lake radio station KLUB to add channel 13 to Salt Lake City so it could apply to build a companion TV station, which would have required changes in unused VHF assignments in Richfield, Vernal, and Rock Springs, Wyoming. That petition was opposed by Great Desert, which at the time was seeking channel 20; the Salt Lake VHF stations; and educational television interests in Utah, including KWCS-TV, who were concerned that a commercial station on channel 13 would affect the translators they used to rebroadcast their programming.

The concept of VHF drop-ins—changes to station spacing that permitted the insertion of new VHF channel allocations in cities across the United States—continued to be of interest, particularly because, in other cities, there were not enough VHF television stations for all three major networks. In 1977, the FCC initially approved four drop-ins nationwide—including channel 13 for Salt Lake—having whittled down the number of proposed new channels in the preceding years. Its studies found that Salt Lake could support not one but two independent VHF outlets. Springfield Television, then still applying for a permit, asked for a chance to establish itself in the market before a VHF station was dropped in; the group contended that a VHF station would not mean automatic failure for a new UHF. The FCC reaffirmed the decision on a 4–3 vote in 1980. The approval came even though KSTU and KSL-TV had expressed renewed concern over a high-power channel 13 in Salt Lake City causing problems for the translator system.

While KSTU was busy building translators to extend channel 20's reach, interested parties were busy filing applications for channel 13. In December 1980, the first application was received from Utah Television Associates, whose principals included Salt Lake businessman Richard S. McKnight. David and Deanna Williams, owners of a paging service and an AM station in Bountiful, submitted a bid on March 10, 1981, under the name Intermountain Broadcasting. By May, when the commission set a deadline to receive other applications, the field had grown to eight with six further bidders:

- American Television of Utah, a subsidiary of Salt Lake City–based American Stores Company, which had also applied for the unused UHF channel 14;
- West Valley City Television Associates Limited Partnership, led by Salt Lake advertising and real estate figures;
- Mountain West Television Company, in which the largest shareholders were KCPX radio news director Joseph C. Lee and Salt Lake City land developer Sidney Foulger;
- Rocky Mountain Broadcasting, owned by real estate investor John Price;
- Salt Lake City Family TV, consisting primarily of Pennsylvania and Tennessee interests;
- Salt Lake City Utah T.V., a company of Malcolm Glazer, who owned network-affiliated stations in three smaller markets.

This made Salt Lake City the first of the four drop-ins to attract more than one application. By 1984, however, there were multiple applications in all four cities, and Salt Lake was the last of the four to receive a designation for comparative hearing among the applicants, on February 10, 1984. By that time, two of the eight applicants had dropped out. American Television had already won the channel 14 construction permit (which eventually materialized as KXIV in 1989), and Rocky Mountain Broadcasting was no longer in contention by the time the hearing designation order was issued.

FCC administrative law judge Edward Kuhlmann issued an initial decision in May 1985 that looked toward granting Salt Lake City Family TV the permit because of its superior proposal for the integration of ownership and management. With Glazer's application having been abandoned, the four other contestants objected to the commission, whose review board scheduled oral argument in the case. Mountain West Television retained the advice of Wiley Rein, a Washington, D.C., law firm.

=== KSTU moves to channel 13; sale to Fox ===
Wiley Rein attracted two other clients which had interest in channel 13. One was Northstar Communications, a Washington company financially backed by insurer Allstate. The Mountain West principals, with Northstar, formed MWT Limited Partnership; Northstar insisted that Mountain West buy out the other applicants, leading to it obtaining the channel 13 permit. MWT then signed an agreement to purchase all of KSTU's non-license assets from Adams for $30 million in June 1987. Under the terms of the deal, MWT would operate channel 20 until the channel 13 facility was ready to be activated, after which it would surrender the channel 20 license. The Mountain West partners later said that Northstar had refused to provide the financing to outfit a new station, essentially forcing the company to buy KSTU for relocation. It was later reported that Adams was a client of Wiley Rein. To pay for the transaction, Mountain West borrowed $22.5 million; the deal included $10 million in a non-compete agreement with Adams. On November 2, 1987, with the new transmitter facility complete, KSTU's intellectual property (call letters, Fox affiliation, syndicated programming and staff) moved from channel 20 to channel 13. It also moved to channel 13 on local cable systems. Due to the manner in which the changeover was structured legally, the FCC reckons KSTU's current facility on channel 13 as a new license dating from 1987; it was issued a construction permit under the call letters KTMW on July 17 and changed its call letters to KSTU on November 9.

The obligations incurred by the Mountain West partners were financially debilitating. In August 1989, Mountain West and Farragut Communications—part of the Northstar group—put KSTU on the market. While multiple bidders, including Meredith Broadcasting and a group led by then-Fox executive Jamie Kellner, inspected the station, the Fox network itself purchased KSTU. Fox had just sold WFXT in Boston, meaning it had the ability to buy another station. The $41 million deal resulted in the first network-owned TV station in Utah.

The sale's outcome led to long-running litigation. Mountain West's partners said that Northstar capitalized on their weakened position to squeeze them out of profits on the sale to Fox. In 1990, they sued Wiley Rein for $20 million, which they calculated as the financial value if Northstar had financed their venture as a competing independent station. The case became one of the longest civil trials in Utah history; while a trial court initially dismissed the case, the Utah Court of Appeals ordered a trial be held in 1996. After a three-month trial in which 1,000 exhibits were presented and the case record filled 31 volumes, a jury awarded the partners a net total of $18 million in December 1998, but the Utah Supreme Court discarded the monetary award in 2001 and ordered another trial be held, finding that the trial judge had improperly instructed jurors.

Under MWT, KSTU replaced KSL-TV as the exclusive broadcast television home of Utah Jazz basketball in 1988, having carried some Jazz games over the preceding four seasons. However, KSTU indicated that it would not renew the deal after 1993, due to Fox initiating programming seven nights a week. This resulted in KXIV being purchased by Jazz owner Larry H. Miller and becoming KJZZ-TV.

Under Fox, KSTU began airing local news programming in December 1991, progressively expanding its offerings through the next 15 years. At one time in the early 1990s, Elisabeth Murdoch, Rupert Murdoch's daughter, served as programming manager. In 2000, when Fox Television Stations acquired the Chris-Craft Industries station group, it traded away ABC affiliate KTVX to keep KSTU.

=== Local TV and Tribune ownership ===
On June 13, 2007, Fox announced the sale of KSTU and seven other owned-and-operated stations to Local TV LLC, a subsidiary of Oak Hill Capital Partners. The sale was finalized on July 14, 2008. Under Local TV LLC, KSTU bought the adjacent building to double its studio footprint to 26,000 square feet (2,400 m^{2}), part of a construction project that also outfitted the station for high-definition news production. On July 1, 2013, the Tribune Company acquired Local TV for $2.75 billion; the sale was completed on December 27. That year, KSTU ranked third in revenue among the four major Salt Lake TV stations, far behind KSL and KUTV but well ahead of KTVX.

=== Sinclair and Fox purchase attempt; sale to Scripps ===
Sinclair Broadcast Group entered into an agreement to acquire Tribune Media on May 8, 2017, for $3.9 billion plus the assumption of $2.7 billion in Tribune-held debt. As Sinclair already owned KUTV, KJZZ-TV, and KMYU in the market, the company offered to sell KSTU back to Fox Television Stations as part of a $910 million deal; Howard Stirk Holdings concurrently agreed to purchase KMYU. The merger was terminated on August 9, 2018, by Tribune Media, nullifying both transactions; this followed a public rejection of the deal by FCC chairman Ajit Pai and vote by the commission to designate it for hearing by an administrative law judge, which was seen as a death knell for the proposed transaction.

Following the collapse of the Sinclair merger, Nexstar Media Group announced its intention to purchase Tribune Media on December 3, 2018, for $6.4 billion in cash and debt. Due to Nexstar owning KTVX and KUCW, the E. W. Scripps Company agreed to purchase KSTU as part of $1.32 billion in overall divestments by Nexstar in order to meet regulatory approval. The sale was completed on September 19, 2019.

In the 2023–24 NHL season, during Vegas Golden Knights conflicts on KUPX-TV, select Arizona Coyotes hockey games aired on KSTU's second digital subchannel, which usually carried Antenna TV.

== News operation ==
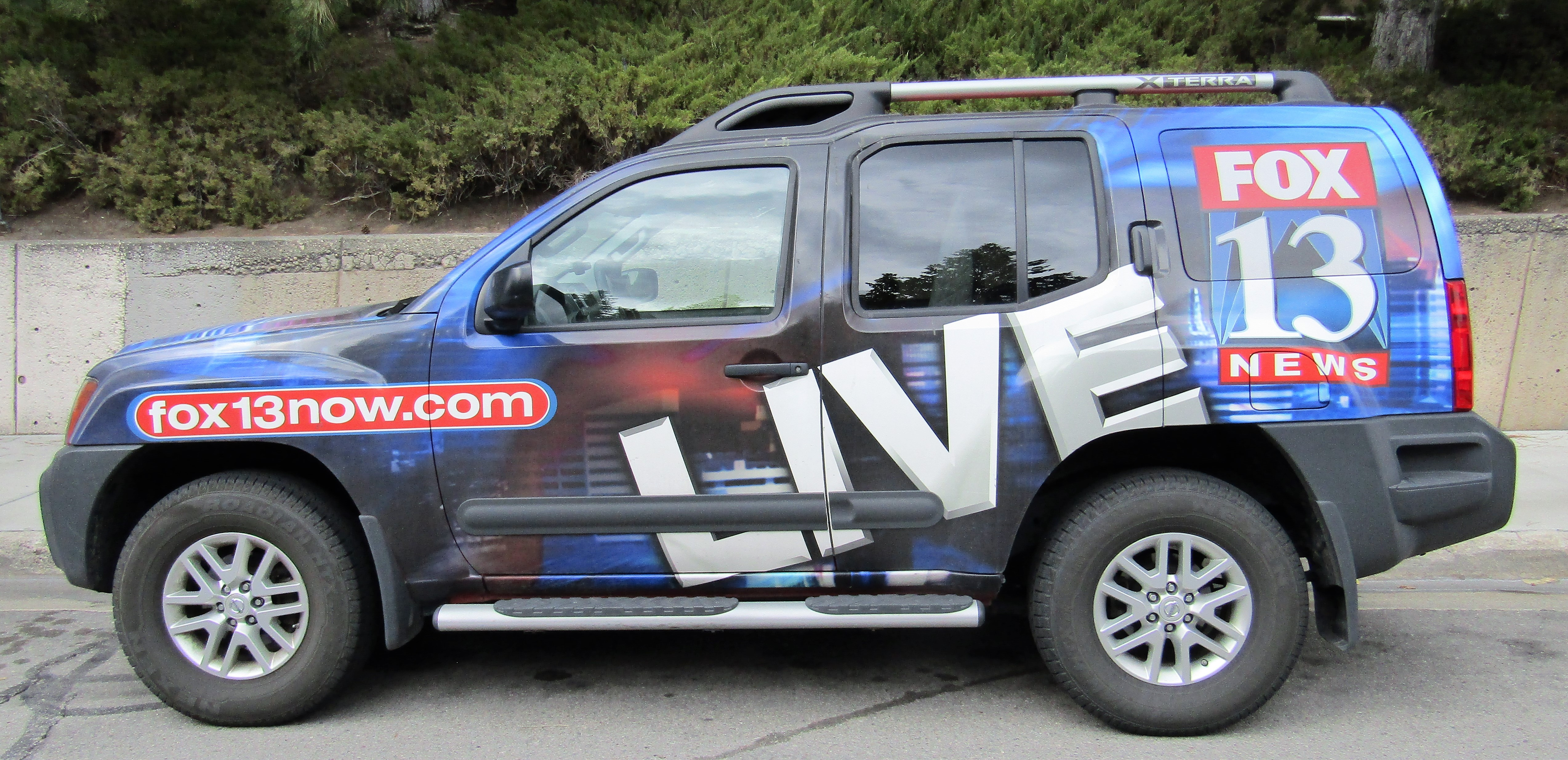
A KSTU news van in 2018

In 1984, when the station was an independent owned by Adams, KSTU general manager Vickie Street told Electronic Media that the station could not hope to compete with the well-established VHF stations in news, commenting, "We have two giants here. Their news budget is bigger than my entire operations budget. It would be David versus Goliath." However, the acquisition by Fox made KSTU one of just two stations owned by the company not to produce local news programming (the other was KDAF in Dallas). As part of a corporate push to bring news to the remaining stations, in 1991, KSTU began building out a news department. Nick Clooney, a veteran television anchor and the father of actor George Clooney, was the original news anchor. In addition to serving the Salt Lake market, the KSTU newscast was intended as a prototype for the development of similar newsrooms at mid-market Fox affiliates, and it also functioned as a test bed for Sony and Fox to test a new video camera system based on the Hi8 format.

The Fox News at Nine debuted on December 31, 1991. It was not the first 9 p.m. newscast in modern Utah television, as KXIV briefly aired a KSL-TV-produced newscast between October 1991 and September 1992. Clooney was dismissed in 1993 as part of a change in direction for the local newscast. These changes were driven by Lisa Gregorisch-Dempsey—later the producer of syndicated newsmagazine Extra—who was placed at KSTU by Murdoch and increased the pace of the format. Gregorisch-Dempsey then left Salt Lake in 1994 to start a newsroom at KDAF in Dallas, which was eventually scrapped when Fox announced its plans to sell the station and move its affiliation. The half-hour newscast became an hour-long show in 1994.

The mid-1990s saw the start of KSTU's expansion beyond prime time news coverage with the addition of noon and morning newscasts in 1996. While the noon newscast initially rated poorly, the morning news—now known as Good Day Utah—was expanded to a second hour the next year. With expansions of newscasts in a variety of time slots, KSTU was producing eight hours of news a day by 2012, ten hours by 2015, and 10 1/2 hours—part of 62 1/2 hours of news output a week—in 2016.

On September 12, 2025, in the aftermath of the assassination of Charlie Kirk, two men were arrested after an incendiary device planted under a KSTU news vehicle failed to detonate.

=== Notable former on-air staff ===
- Brad Giffen – anchor

== Technical information and subchannels ==
The KSTU transmitter is on Farnsworth Peak. Its signal is multiplexed:

Subchannels of KSTU
Subchannel	Res.	Short name	Programming
13.1	720p	KSTU-HD	Fox
13.2	720p	ION	Ion
13.3	480i	COURTTV	Court TV
13.4	480i	BOUNCE	Bounce TV
13.5	480i	QVC	QVC
13.6	480i	QVC2	QVC2
13.7	480i	HSN	HSN

=== Analog-to-digital conversion ===
KSTU shut down its analog signal, over VHF channel 13, on June 12, 2009, as part of the federally mandated transition from analog to digital television. The station's digital signal remained on its pre-transition UHF channel 28, using virtual channel 13.

=== Translators ===
More than 80 retransmitters broadcast KSTU's signal throughout Utah and into portions of neighboring states.

- Antimony: K30OS-D
- Beaver, Utah: K13AAL-D
- Beryl, Modena, Newcastle: K25GY-D
- Bicknell, etc.: K20MO-D
- Blanding, Monticello: K36AK-D
- Bluff & Area: K15HN-D
- Boulder: K30OV-D
- Caineville: K31KN-D
- Cedar Canyon: K04RW-D
- Cedar City: K10PN-D
- Circleville, etc.: K18MI-D
- Clear Creek: K28KP-D
- Coalville, etc.: K30KG-D
- Delta, Oak City: K30PG-D
- Duchesne, etc.: K36IM-D
- East Carbon County: K18MY-D
- East Price: K13AAP-D
- Emery: K28PI-D
- Escalante: K29HN-D
- Ferron: K30PP-D
- Fillmore, etc.: K29MN-D
- Fishlake Resort: K29JQ-D
- Fountain Green: K29LZ-D
- Fremont: K35NE-D
- Fruitland: K19MH-D
- Garfield, etc.: K21MX-D
- Garrison, etc.: K34PA-D
- Green River: K21JV-D, K30PN-D (Cedar Mountain)
- Hanksville: K34NT-D
- Hatch: K14QX-D
- Heber City: K29MC-D
- Helper: K12XI-D
- Henefer, etc.: K33LV-D
- Henriville: K20MY-D
- Huntington: K30PS-D
- Huntsville, Liberty: K28JK-D
- Kanab: K28OS-D
- Kanab: K33NT-D
- Kanarraville, etc.: K36PA-D
- Koosharem: K20MV-D
- Laketown, etc.: K48GV-D
- Leamington: K15LL-D
- Logan: K28OS-D
- Long Valley Junction: K12WZ-D
- Manila, etc.: K33PQ-D
- Manti, Ephraim: K29EM-D
- Marysvale: K13AAI-D
- Mayfield: K15CD-D
- Mexican Hat: K18IB-D
- Milford, etc.: K15FQ-D
- Montezuma Creek, Aneth: K23JC-D
- Morgan, etc.: K28JL-D
- Mount Pleasant: K23NR-D
- Myton: K22NE-D
- Navajo Mountain: K18HZ-D
- Nephi: K22OO-D
- Oljeto: K18IA-D
- Orangeville: K21NP-D
- Orderville: K16BT-D, K27KH-D (Alton)
- Panguitch, etc.: K20MX-D
- Park City: K35OP-D
- Peoa, etc.: K36PK-D
- Randolph, Woodruff: K30JG-D
- Richfield, etc.: K20MS-D
- Roosevelt: K13AAN-D
- Rural Garfield County: K28GM-D
- Rural Juab, etc.: K13OG-D
- Rural Juab County: K14PA-D
- Rural Sevier County: K20MW-D
- Salina, Redmond: K13AAH-D
- Samak: K28JS-D
- Santa Clara, etc.: K26QF-D
- Scofield: K29MT-D
- Scipio: K15LK-D
- St. George: KKRP-LD 21, K25PA-D
- Summit County: K25OY-D
- Tropic, Cannonville: K29GJ-D
- Vernal, etc.: K35IQ-D
- Wanship: K29HX-D
- Wendover: K16MN-D
- Woodland, Kamas: K13AAJ-D
- Cortez, CO: K23LH-D
- Holbrook, ID: K33QF-D
- Malad City, ID: K16MW-D
- Mink Creek, ID: K07XM-D
- Montpelier, ID: K34OH-D
- Preston, ID: K19EW-D
- Soda Springs, ID: K25OI-D
- Big Piney, etc., WY: K24DA-D
