= UEN =

UEN may refer to:

- Ueno Station, JR East station code
- Union for Environment and Nature
- Union for Europe of the Nations
- Urban East Norwegian
- Utah Education Network
