= Eccles Broadcast Center =

Broadcasting facility in Salt Lake City, Utah

Coordinates: 40.7674°N 111.8378°W

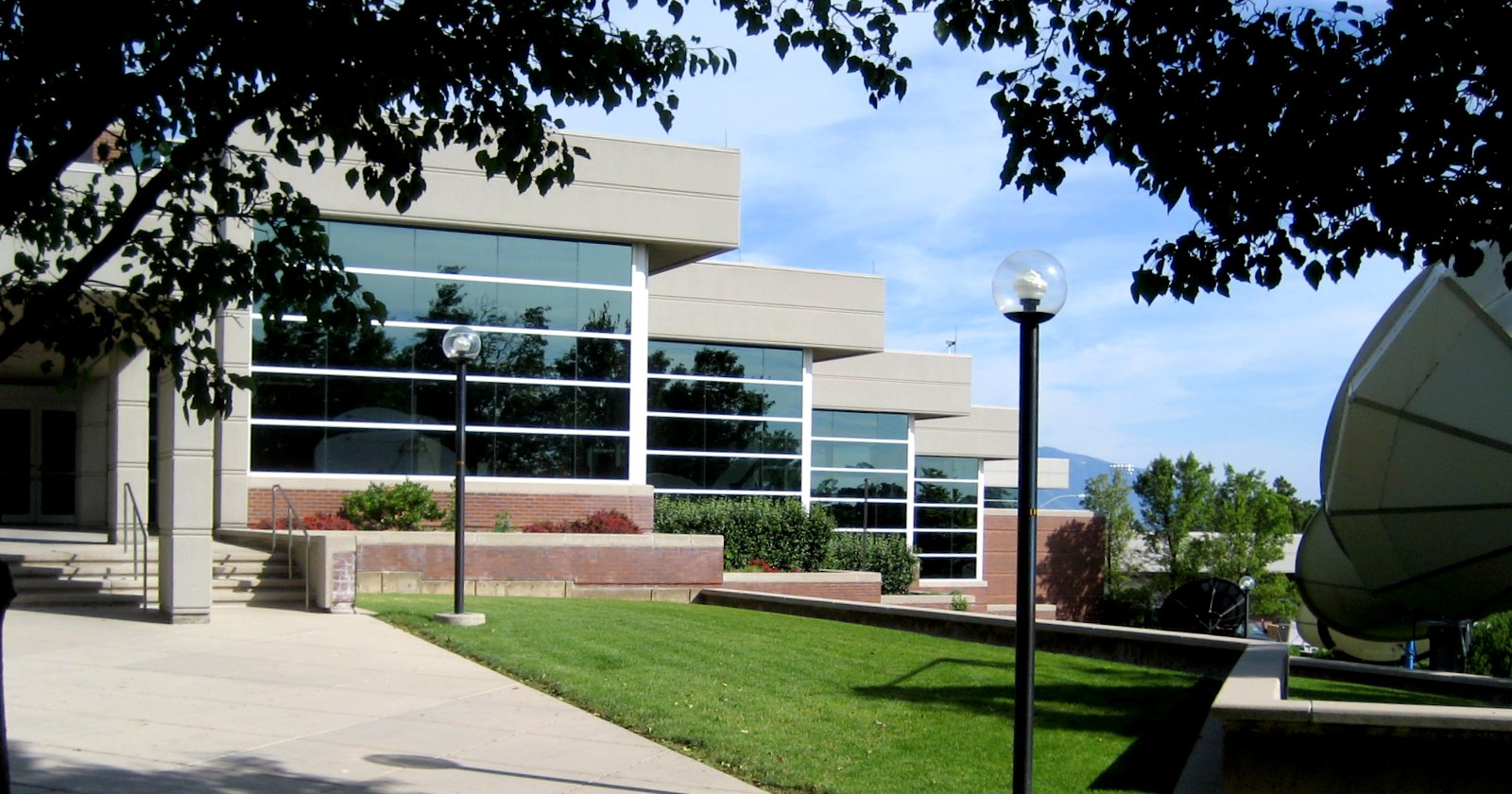
Northwest exterior of the Eccles Broadcast Center

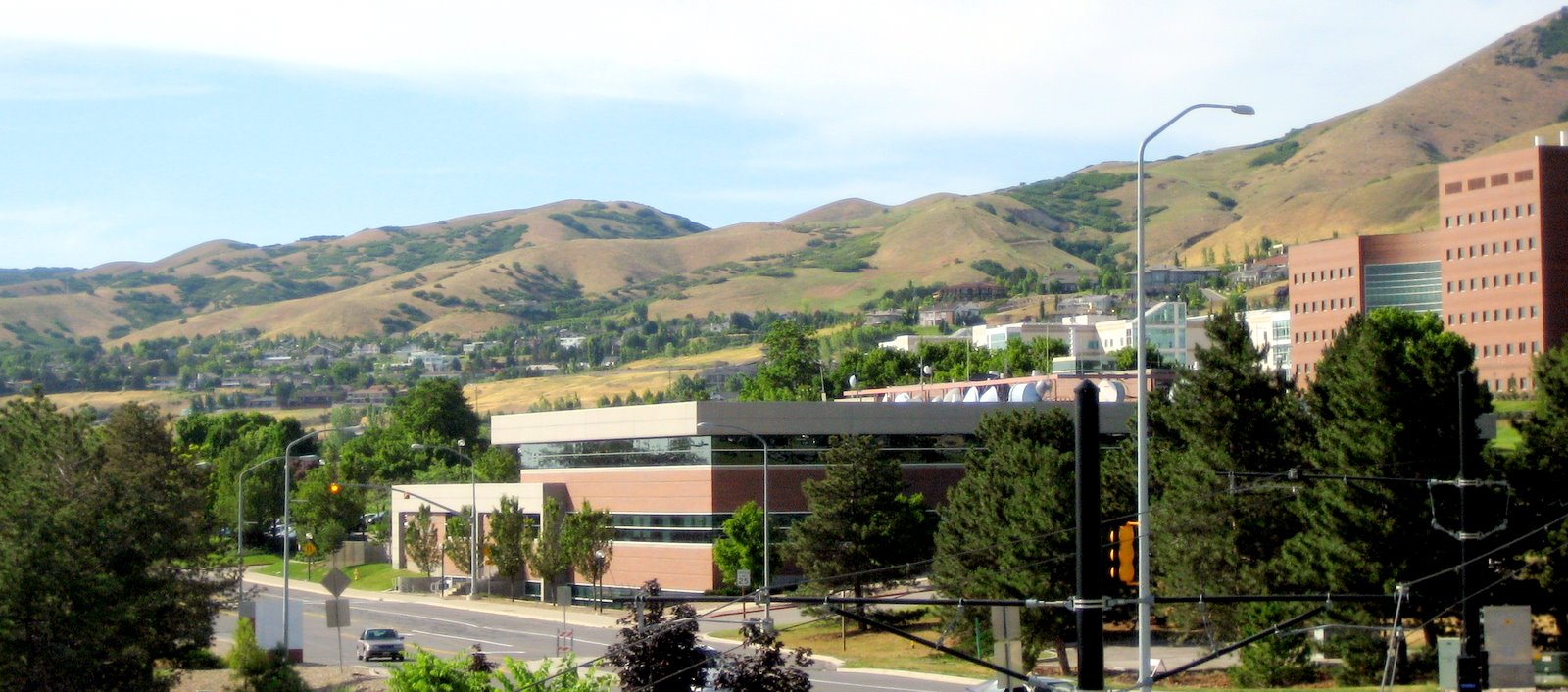
Southwest exterior of the Eccles Broadcast Center

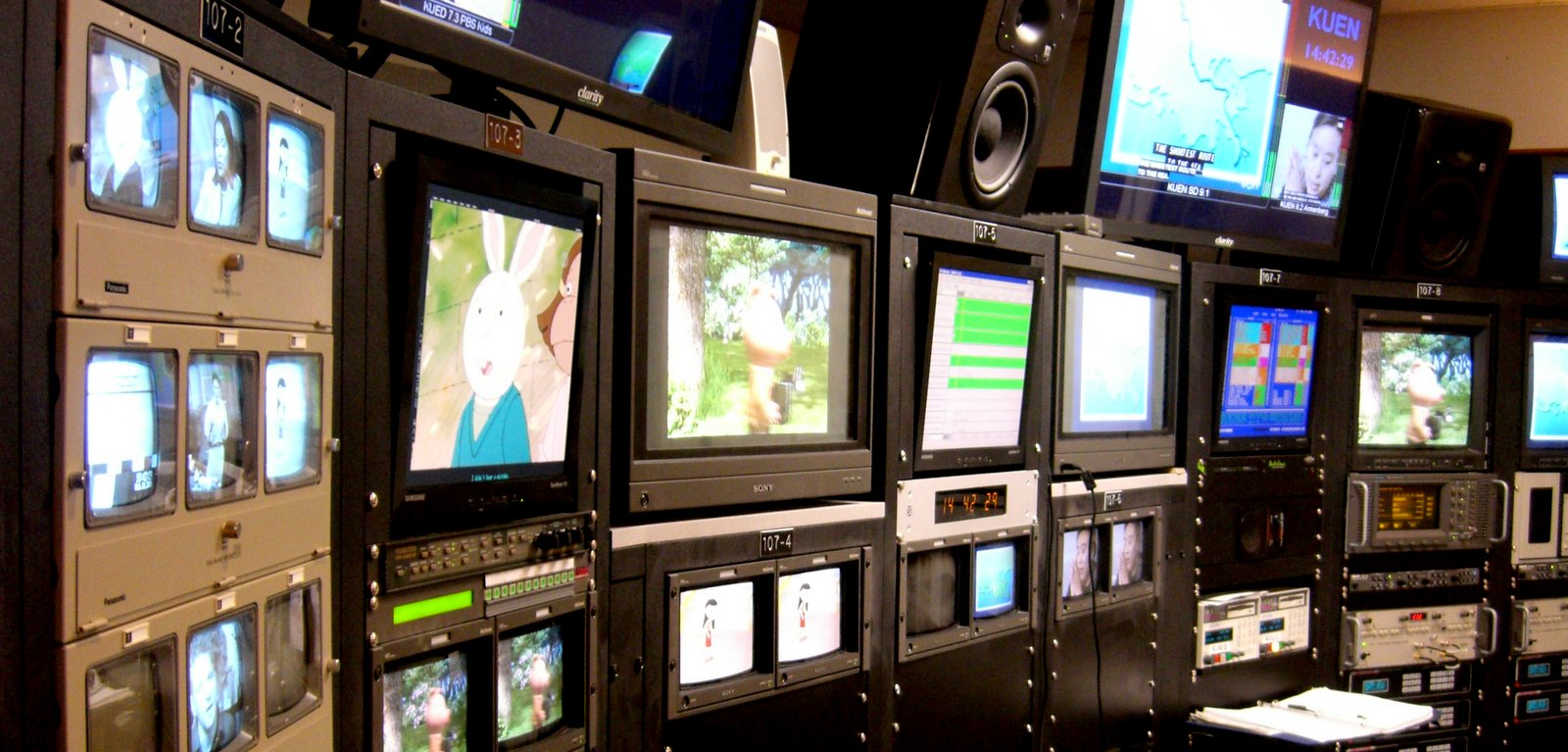
On-air control room for KUED and UEN-TV at the Eccles Broadcast Center

The Dolores Doré Eccles Broadcast Center (often shortened to Eccles Broadcast Center) is headquarters of three broadcast stations and a statewide educational consortium. The center houses KUED, KUER, KUEN and the Utah Education Network. The facility is northeast of the Jon M. Huntsman Center and southwest of the Huntsman Cancer Institute on the University of Utah campus in Salt Lake City.

== Renovation project ==
The facility started in 1993 with a $5.5 million gift from the George S. and Dolores Dore Eccles Foundation and included 59,191 square feet (5,499.0 m^{2}). An expansion, completed in 2001, added 40,307 square feet (3,744.6 m^{2}). The original structure cost $8.8 million. The cost of the expansion was $7.6 million according to an Open House brochure published December 7, 2001. Architect Dick Huss, AIA of Babcock Design Group planned the original structure and the addition. Okland Construction Company served as general contractor.

== Produced at the Eccles Broadcast Center (partial list) ==
- Aftermath of Meth (KUED)
- Brigham Young (KUED)
- Conversations with Ted Capener (KUED)
- eMedia, College Media and Media Hub (UEN, Media Solutions, KUED)
- NetSafe Utah (UEN & KUED)
- Nighttime Jazz with Steve Williams (KUER)
- Pioneer, Utah's Online Library (UEN)
- Radio West (KUER)
- The Governor's Monthly News Conference (KUED)
- The Struggle for Statehood (KUED)
- The Utah PTA Golden Apple Awards (KUED)
- UEN SciFi Friday (UEN)
- University of Utah Web Site (Media Solutions)
- Utah World War II Stories (KUED)
- VoteUtah Web site (KUED, UEN)
- What's in a Song (Western Folklife Center for NPR)
- Why the Cowboy Sings (Western Folklife Center & KUED)

== See also ==
- Spencer Eccles
