= Utah Education Network =

Broadband and digital broadcast network

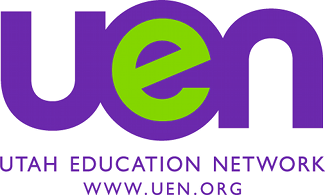

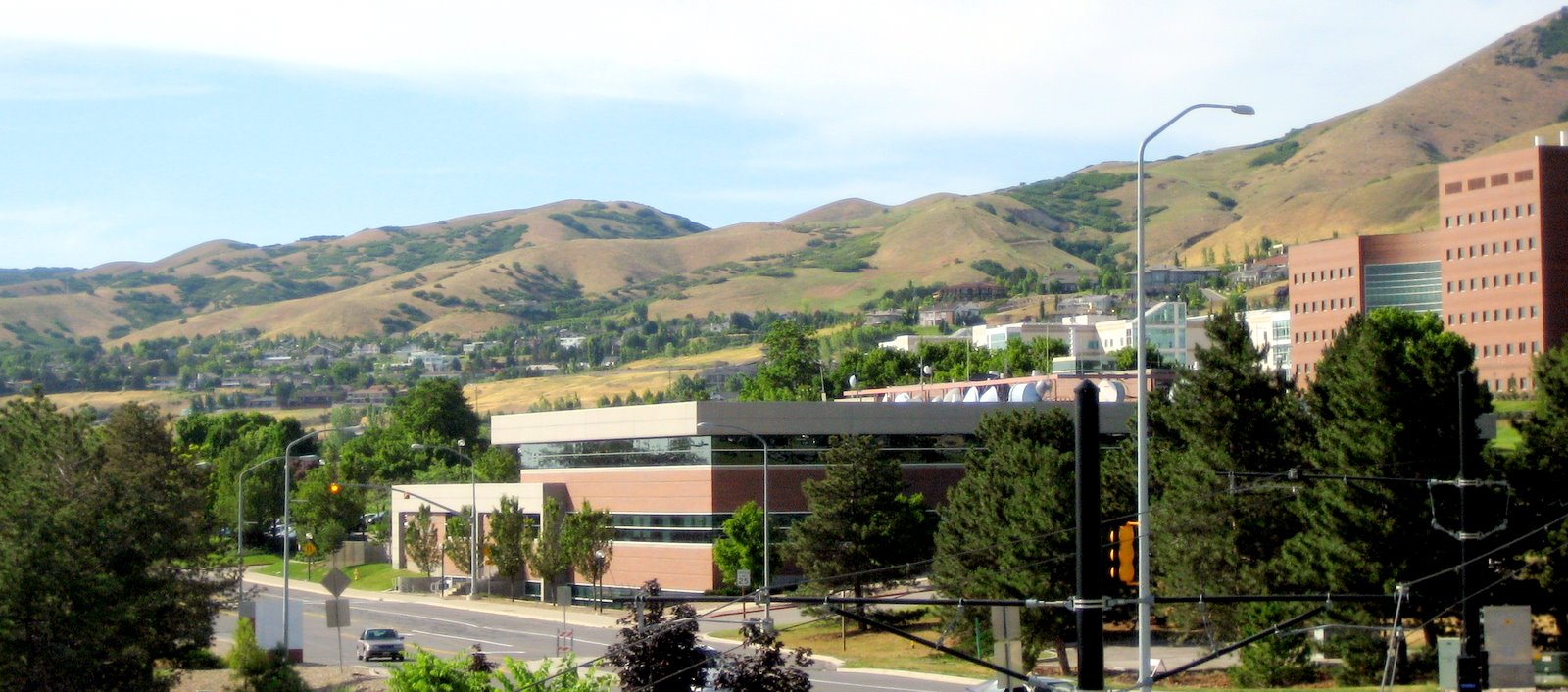
- The statewide Utah Education Network is headquartered at the Eccles Broadcast Center in Salt Lake City.
- Type: Non-profit organization
- Industry: education; data networking; public broadcasting
- Founded: 1989
- Headquarters: University of Utah, Salt Lake City, Utah
- Website: www.uen.org

The Utah Education Network (UEN) is a broadband and digital broadcast network serving public education, higher education, applied technology campuses, libraries, and public charter schools throughout the state of Utah. The Network facilitates interactive video conferencing, provides instructional support services, and operates a public television station (KUEN) on behalf of the Utah State Board of Regents. UEN services benefit more than 60,000 faculty and staff, and more than 780,000 students from pre-schoolers in Head Start programs through grandparents in graduate school. UEN headquarters are in Salt Lake City at the Eccles Broadcast Center on the University of Utah campus.

== History ==
The Utah State Legislature formally established UEN in 1989, but the statewide collaboration of public education and higher education started more than two decades earlier when KUED-Channel 7 signed on the air in 1958. The station built translator towers to beam its signal to remote communities, and eventually the station placed analog microwave equipment on some of those towers enabling two-way teleconferencing for education and government. The system was initially named SETOC (State Educational Technical Operations Center), renamed as EDNET and is now UEN IVC (Interactive Video Conferencing). In December 1986, KULC-Channel 9 (now UEN-TV) started broadcasting as Utah’s Learning Channel, and in 1994 UEN started UtahLINK, the Internet component of the Network. All of those services now operate as the Utah Education Network. UEN-TV and sister station KUED were broadcasting digitally by June 2012, but experiments in statewide digital broadcasting were underway as early as 2004.

== Services ==
Three infrastructure services are integral to UEN’s mission of networking for education. Students, parents, educators, and local communities all benefit from these services. They include:

- Networking Services, to extend and maintain UEN’s broadband and digital TV networks, including the UEN Wide Area Network, Internet access and filtering and securing monitoring.
- Application Services, to provide video conferencing, library and learning management resources at high efficiency through shared support and statewide purchasing discounts.
- Support Services, to assist the users of UEN infrastructure and hosting, including teachers, faculty, librarians and regional support centers.

== Funding ==
UEN is funded by the public through an annual state appropriation, e-rate reimbursements from the FCC’s Universal Service Fund, and from local, state and federal grants. In fiscal year 2013, UEN funding totaled $38.2 million with about 45% ($17.4 million) appropriated by the Utah State Legislature. Through public/private partnerships with local telecommunications companies UEN sustains local economic development with $16.5 million of Networking Services budget paid to Utah telecommunication providers for leased circuits.

== Service area ==
UEN’s geographic reach stretches from Logan to St. George and from the Grouse Creek to Navajo Mountain. The Network connects more than 1000 public schools, nine state colleges and universities, and eight applied technology campuses. Those connections serve more than 841,000 students, teachers, faculty and staff.

== See also ==
- Eccles Broadcast Center
- KUEN (UEN-TV)
- KUED
- KUER
