= KWCS-TV =

Educational TV station in Ogden, Utah (1960–1971)

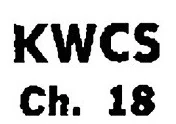
- Ogden, Utah; United States
- Channels: Analog: 18 (UHF)

Ownership
- Owner: Weber County Schools

History
- First air date: October 11, 1960
- Last air date: 1971
- Call sign meaning: Weber County Schools

Technical information
- Licensing authority: FCC
- ERP: 10 kW
- HAAT: −850 ft (−260 m)
- Transmitter coordinates: 41°14′44″N 111°58′07″W
- Translator(s): K13EF Huntsville

Links
- Public license information: Public file; LMS

KWCS-TV (channel 18) was a non-commercial educational television station in Ogden, Utah, United States, which broadcast from 1960 until the early 1970s. Owned by Weber County Schools, the station broadcast instructional programming for students in the county's elementary and junior high schools. It also broadcast evening programming from National Educational Television (NET). KWCS-TV itself disappeared after being merged with KOET, the station operated by the Ogden City Board of Education; Weber County pulled out of the partnership in 1973, a move which also prompted the closure of the Ogden school board's station.

== History ==
Weber County Schools, the school district covering all schools in Weber County outside of the city of Ogden, had been using closed-circuit television to provide courses to 1,700 students at its two high schools since 1959—the first such system in Utah. Work began May 9, 1960, on constructing the new station. A 100 ft (30 m) tower was erected on the south side of the Weber High School campus to beam programs from the existing studios to the junior high and elementary schools. Junior high students would receive science and Utah history classes; elementary school courses offered over KWCS-TV at the start of its operation included French, art, music, children's literature, and science. KWCS-TV was inaugurated October 10, 1960, and entered service the next day, when, at 8:05 a.m., 4,800 eighth grade students in 17 junior high schools received a 20-minute science lesson. Channel 18 was also used to broadcast in-services to teachers. KWCS-TV, the first full-power UHF television station in the state, was built with $70,000 of federal funds and benefited the next year from a $64,000 grant from the Ford Foundation to purchase video tape equipment. By this time, the district was increasing the screen size of its television sets and planning for a live weekly show.

Initially broadcasting with an effective radiated power of 1,000 watts, KWCS-TV was not sufficient to reach the entire county. In May 1961, the district applied to the Federal Communications Commission to build a translator on channel 13 to cover Huntsville, Eden and Liberty. This would allow the Valley School, the last school in the district not connected, to begin receiving KWCS programs. The FCC approved the application in March 1962; by the end of the year, translator K13EF was in operation and feeding one TV set at the Valley School.

In October 1964, evening programming began, with KWCS-TV screening shows from NET. The next year, the district sought federal funds to update and replace aging equipment. The district was allotted $112,000 in order to buy new equipment, including a replacement for its 13-year-old transmitter, a relocation of K13EF to improve its coverage, and the expansion of KWCS into the school districts of Morgan and Davis counties. KWCS-TV had also expanded its program offerings to students, with new science classes in first and second grade and third- and fourth-grade art. The relocated translator was constructed atop Mount Ogden in 1966, though it missed the start of the school year due to equipment delays related to the Vietnam War. The use of channel 13 for the translator prompted pushback when KLUB radio proposed the assignment of the channel for commercial television in Salt Lake City; KWCS and the Utah Joint Committee on Educational Television noted that educational translators, including K13EF, used the channel.

For most of its operating life, KWCS-TV was one of two educational television stations in Weber County. The other was born in 1962 when the Ogden city schools acquired independent station KVOG-TV (channel 9) and converted it to instructional programming as KOET. By the late 1960s, Utah had five noncommercial educational television stations. In addition to the University of Utah's KUED, the sign-ons of KWCS, KOET, KUSU-TV at Utah State University, and KBYU-TV at Brigham Young University all took place between 1960 and 1965, meaning that there were more educational outlets than commercial ones in the state. Meanwhile, the Weber district was reducing its use of KWCS due to financial problems. A joint committee on educational television proposed converting the Weber and Logan operations into production centers for KUED. Weber School District superintendent William R. Boren said that "one really fine" educational station was preferable to "four or five so-so ones". Meanwhile, officials in the Weber district began considering the idea of merging into KOET, saying that the operation of two educational TV stations located six blocks apart was duplicative and expensive. In July 1971, the city and county school districts announced their intent to merge KOET and KWCS, which would allow for cost savings and a more efficient operation. The two stations won additional grants from the Corporation for Public Broadcasting in 1972, while some equipment of the Weber system was transferred to allow programs to be originated from Weber State College for KUED. Two years later, Weber County pulled out of the partnership with the Ogden schools. In February 1975, the FCC deleted the call letters of KOET and KWCS-TV and declared their licenses expired. The channel 18 allocation for Ogden was later changed to channel 16 and returned to the air in 1998 as a new commercial station, KUPX-TV.
