= KOET (Utah) =

Television station in Ogden, Utah (1960–1973)

- Ogden, Utah; United States
- Channels: Analog: 9 (VHF)

Ownership
- Owner: Ogden City School District; (Ogden City Board of Education)

History
- First air date: December 5, 1960
- Last air date: December 5, 1973
- Former call signs: KVOG-TV (1960–1962)
- Call sign meaning: Ogden Educational Television

Technical information
- ERP: 24.4 kW
- HAAT: 230 m (750 ft)
- Transmitter coordinates: 41°15′17″N 112°14′14″W

KOET (channel 9) was a non-commercial educational television station in Ogden, Utah, United States, which broadcast from 1960 until 1973. After 1962, the station was operated by the Ogden City School District and broadcast instructional programming for students in its schools. It also broadcast evening programming from National Educational Television (NET). In 1971, KOET merged with KWCS-TV, the station operated by the Weber County School District, on KOET's license. Two years later, however, Weber County pulled out, and the district was hamstrung by the Federal Communications Commission (FCC)'s refusal to reclassify KOET as a commercial station in finding buyers for its license and facilities. The station ceased operating at the end of the 1972–1973 school year.

== History ==
=== KVOG-TV ===
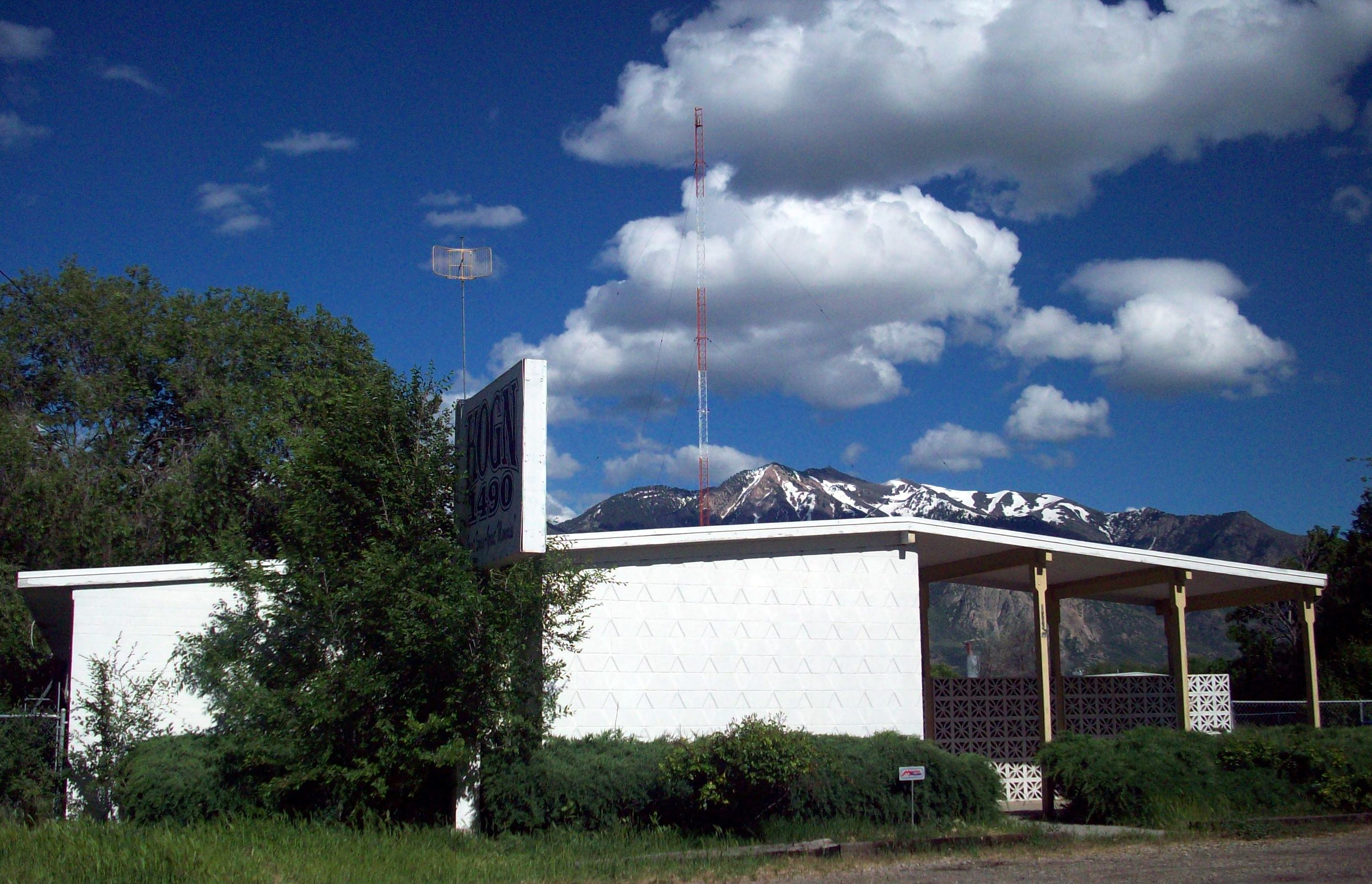
A television studio was built at 1538 Gibson, the studio and transmitter site of KVOG radio

Channel 9 in Ogden began its life as commercial station KVOG-TV, owned by the United Broadcasting Company along with KVOG radio (1490 kHz, now KOGN). A two-story studio building was erected at KVOG's studio on Gibson Avenue in Ogden at a cost of $80,000 to house the new operation, with a transmitter atop Little Mountain. The station went on air December 5, 1960, as the first commercial TV station in Ogden and the second new station there in 1960, after educational KWCS-TV, which had entered into regular service on October 11.

As a commercial station, KVOG-TV was an independent, restoring independent television to the state after KLOR-TV left the air that March. The station aired Utah's first 9 p.m. newscast, listed in schedules as the News at 9 on 9. KVOG-TV's news service aired six nights a week and also included the "Sportsteller" sports segment, sponsored by Commercial Security Bank.

=== KOET ===
Owner Arch G. Webb found the television business difficult, and he soon sought a buyer. He found one in the Ogden city school board, of which he had previously been a member. On January 10, 1962, the school board, long desirous to enter into the educational television landscape, approved the acquisition of KVOG-TV for $180,000. Immediately, on January 15, KVOG began offering airtime to the Ogden schools. Upon acquiring KVOG-TV at a final cost of $155,500, the board changed the call letters to KOET, for "Ogden Educational Television", and converted the license to noncommercial operation. In its first school year as a noncommercial station, the new KOET aired educational films. Live productions included music and art programs for elementary school students; a series on learning Spanish for sixth-graders; and Perspective, a weekly report to teachers on district administrative activities.

Ogden school officials, however, soon expressed a lack of interest in wanting to keep KOET. In 1967, the school board rejected an offer by Utah State University to buy KOET and make it a joint operation with its KUSU-TV in Logan. Instead, they accepted one by James Lavenstein of Salt Lake City; Lavenstein proposed to have the station run educational programs prior to 3 p.m. and commercial programs after that time. Lavenstein also proposed to replace KOET's studio equipment to begin color broadcasts. The sale of an educational television station to commercial interests, described as "novel", would prove to be a hurdle prompting two years of legal battles at the Federal Communications Commission. Late in 1970, the FCC finally ruled against the proposal. In denying the petition, the FCC said that with the closure of KUSU—converted earlier that year into a production center for KUED and replaced with a translator of that station for viewers in Logan—and the possible shutdown of KWCS, the potential for KOET to become a full-time commercial station would seriously limit educational broadcasting in northern Utah. Commercial broadcasters, resisting competition, said that a fourth commercial station in Salt Lake would hinder the development of UHF broadcasting. The district opted to keep the facilities for the time being after appeals of the FCC ruling failed.

Meanwhile, officials in the Weber district began considering the idea of merging KWCS into KOET, saying that the operation of two educational TV stations located six blocks apart was duplicative and expensive. In July 1971, the city and county school districts announced their intent to merge KOET and KWCS, which would allow for cost savings and a more efficient operation. The two stations won additional grants from the Corporation for Public Broadcasting in 1972.

=== Closure ===
Weber County, however, pulled out of the partnership with the Ogden schools in 1973, requiring the Ogden city board of education to determine whether it wanted to continue to pursue operating its station. The district's educational programs, at this point, were primarily confined to the elementary schools. The district's superintendent, William Garner, and Utah state superintendent of public instruction Walter Talbot met to discuss the possibility of the state acquiring KOET and moving channel 9 to Salt Lake City if the next legislative session would fund it. The state plans would have seen a new transmitter commissioned in the Oquirrh Mountains to expand the facility's coverage. As the district opened bidding to sell the Little Mountain transmitter site that July, superintendent Garner expressed regret over converting channel 9 to noncommercial operation. As the state debated the possibility, the school board agreed to encourage private purchasers to declare interest in acquiring KOET. Ultimately, the state government opted not to take on the Ogden station. The Utah state highway department expressed interest in acquiring the transmitter site; an official with the department urged the school board to liquidate its equipment "piecemeal". When the highway department was the only bidder on part of the equipment in 1974, the board rejected the bid as low. An attempt to sell the facilities to a West Coast-based consortium for $110,000 also collapsed, citing the uncertainty created by the FCC's refusal to relicense KOET as a commercial television station. With the license having expired in October (in February 1975, the FCC deleted the call letters), the facilities were finally sold in December to Wendell Winegar, owner of KDYL radio in Tooele, for $90,000.
