= KUSU-TV =

Educational TV station in Logan, Utah (1964–1970)

- Logan, Utah; United States
- Channels: Analog: 12 (VHF)

Ownership
- Owner: Utah State University
- Sister stations: KUSU-FM

History
- First air date: March 16, 1964
- Last air date: November 14, 1970
- Call sign meaning: Utah State University

Technical information
- ERP: 31.1 kW
- HAAT: −570 ft (−170 m)
- Transmitter coordinates: 41°44′49″N 111°48′24″W

KUSU-TV, VHF analog channel 12, was a non-commercial educational television station licensed to Logan, Utah, United States, which broadcast from 1964 until 1970. The station was owned by Utah State University. It went dark in 1970 as part of a consolidation plan to unify Utah's fragmented educational television landscape and replaced with a translator of KUED-TV in Salt Lake City.

== History ==
The channel 12 construction permit was first obtained by a proposed commercial station for Logan, KVNU-TV, to be co-owned with KVNU radio (610 AM). The Cache Valley Broadcasting Company was granted the construction permit in February 1958; while the Federal Communications Commission canceled it in November for failure to be built, the company asked for the permit to be reinstated.

Utah State had produced television programs for air on other stations—including, after 1958, the University of Utah's KUED-TV channel 7. Utah State also built its own TV studio in Logan, to be connected to Salt Lake via microwave link, in order to save on travel costs of people and tapes, which was completed in 1961. The university desired to build a TV station, but the lone VHF allocation for Logan was taken by the KVNU-TV construction permit. After deciding that programming an independent commercial TV station in Logan would be a difficult proposition, Cache Valley sold the station to the university in November 1960 for $6,331, a sum representing the company's expenses in procuring the permit.

In January 1961, the KUSU-TV call letters were assigned; at the same time, KVSC became KUSU-FM. While the university initially considered a mountaintop site, the FCC at the time did not permit VHF television stations to be operated by remote control, so it was decided to instead build the station on campus. The university received funds from the Utah state legislature in 1963 and applied for additional federal monies under the Educational Television Facilities Act, becoming one of the first five grantees under the new law; in its application, USU noted that the Cache Valley did not receive a city-grade signal from KUED or the educational TV stations in Ogden (KOET and KWCS-TV). A new 260-foot (79 m) tower, the highest structure on the campus, was commissioned for the station.

KUSU signed on March 16, 1964, under program test authority from the FCC. The new station was a member of National Educational Television at launch, originally "bicycling" tapes until a network microwave link was installed to Logan in January 1969. That same year, the station received permission to broadcast in color, though KUSU-TV's facilities could not originate color shows; colorcasts were limited to live network programs and color tapes. It also broadcast local instructional programming and productions from the University of Utah and Brigham Young University.

KUSU-TV had formed part of a stampede of new noncommercial television stations in Utah. Between 1960 and 1965, the Weber County schools had built KWCS-TV; Ogden's city school board bought KVOG-TV and converted it to instructional programming as KOET; and BYU put KBYU-TV on the air after having bought the license of the defunct KLOR-TV. In 1967, when the Ogden board put KOET up for sale, Utah State attempted to buy it and convert it into a semi-satellite of KUSU-TV. However, the sheer number of educational TV stations in the state led to a push for consolidation, and the Joint Commission on Educational Television opted to consolidate instructional television at KUED. In February 1970, KUSU-TV announced it would cease broadcast operations and return to supplying programs to KUED. On November 15, 1970, KUSU-TV was replaced with a new translator of KUED on channel 12, though at a different site and lower power, bringing to an end Logan's own noncommercial TV station. That day, the full-power antenna was removed by helicopter from the tower.
