= Weber School District =

School district in Weber County, Utah

Location
- Weber County, Utah United States

District information
- Type: Public
- Grades: K–12
- Superintendent: Gina Butters
- Asst. superintendent(s): Clyde Moore, Dave Hales
- Schools: 5 high schools 9 junior high schools 29 elementary schools
- Budget: $227,396,289 USD (2019)

Students and staff
- Students: ~33,000
- Faculty: 3,831
- Teachers: 1,699
- Staff: 2,132
- Student–teacher ratio: ~19.4

Other information
- Website: wsd.net

Weber School District (/ˈwiːbər/) is a public school district located in Weber County, Utah, United States. The district covers all of Weber County, except the city of Ogden (which has its own district).

== History ==
The district's origins reach as far back as 1849, when Charilla Abbott became the first school teacher at Brown's Fort. During the next half century, the school district grew from that one-room log cabin into what it is today. In June 1905 the independent schools in Weber County outside of Ogden City limits were combined into the Weber County School District. Weber High was the first high school in the district, winning the $300,000 building in 1926 by a vote of 733 to 480. Enrollment has increased substantially with student counts of 6,235 in 1949, 19,234 students in 1969, 25,859 students in 1989, and 30,069 students in 2007. In 2022, Gina Butters was named the superintendent of Weber School District. During 2017, a boundary reassessment was approved, making changes to Fremont High, Kanesville Elementary, West Haven Elementary, and Sand Ridge Jr. High effective at the beginning of the next school year in August 2017.

In February 2018 the Weber School District made news for its policy that required sixth grade girls to accept a boy's request for a dance, whether the girl wanted to dance with him or not.

== Financial ==
Weber School District is listed as one of the top six Utah counties that spend the most on education, with a projected student enrollment increase of 29.6% from 2007 to 2022. It is the fifth largest school district in Utah, with a student to teacher ratio of 20 to 1, although some schools have classes at well over 35 students. As of the 2006 school year, Weber School District was spending $3,449 per student on institutional expenses with a total of $4,958 per student. As of August 2019, the district employs 1,699 teachers, 2,132 support staff, and 80 administrators.

== Schools ==
Weber School District has five high schools, nine junior high schools, and 29 elementary schools. In addition, there are two alternative schools, a magnet school, and an online school.

Name	Type	City	Mascot	Principal	Faculty	Students	Built
A. Parley Bates	Elementary	North Ogden	Braves	Dax Sederholm	38	773	1964
Burch Creek	Elementary	South Ogden	Barracudas	Katie Amsden	33	604	2016
Country View	Elementary	West Haven	Colts	Brandon Lott	27	660	1979
Farr West	Elementary	Farr West	Falcons	Kristi Hancock	47	1,051	1984
Freedom	Elementary	Hooper	Patriots	Kari Breeding	41	879	2001
Green Acres	Elementary	North Ogden	Grizzlies	Heather Georgi	28	522	1977
Haven Bay	Elementary	West Haven	Herons	Justin Skeen			2024
H. Guy Child	Elementary	South Ogden	Chargers	Chance Adams	26	466	1965
Hooper	Elementary	Hooper	Mustangs	Quinn Karlinsey	28	620	1970
Kanesville	Elementary	West Haven	Cougars	Shane Rasmussen	35	737	1977
Lakeview	Elementary	Roy	Leopards	Mary Heslop	26	458	1954
Lomond View	Elementary	Pleasant View	Lions	Nanette Watson	29	634	1959
Majestic	Elementary	Harrisville	Mountaineers	Libby Jacobsen	45	951	1998
Midland	Elementary	Roy	Panthers	Kim Vorwaller	33	551	1985
Municipal	Elementary	Roy	Eagles	Tana Chipp	22	371	
North Ogden	Elementary	North Ogden	Eagles	Ranel Cox	26	588	2009
North Park	Elementary	Roy	Tigers	Michel Strate	32	542	2014
Orchard Springs	Elementary	Pleasant View	Owls	Sherilyn Elliott	^{[A]}	^{[A]}	2019
Pioneer	Elementary	Marriott-Slaterville	Roadrunners	Shelly Harris	26	488	
Plain City	Elementary	Plain City	Panthers	Emily Mangum	38	793	2007
Riverdale	Elementary	Riverdale City	Roadrunners	Jennifer Thomas	25	505	1967
Roosevelt	Elementary	Washington Terrace	Raptors	Heather Hales	30	465	1957
Roy	Elementary	Roy	Rams	Angie Snowden	34	523	
Silver Ridge	Elementary	Farr West	Bobcats	Christy Wagner	^{[A]}	^{[A]}	2019
Uintah	Elementary	South Ogden	Mustangs	Randi Dunyon	38	747	1977
Valley	Elementary	Eden	Bulldogs	Crystal Deamer	29	588	2008
Valley View	Elementary	Roy	Vikings	Justin Willie	25	447	1964
Washington Terrace	Elementary	Washington Terrace	Bulldogs	Phil Nestoryak	28	506	
West Haven	Elementary	West Haven	Hawks	Courtney Geisler	35	680	2004
West Weber	Elementary	West Weber	Cowboys	Daryl Fluckiger	26	522	2015
Mountain View	Jr. High	West Haven	Mavericks	Matthew Patterson	^{[A]}	^{[A]}	2024
North Ogden	Jr. High	North Ogden	Knights	Nichole Warren-Doman	36	802	1968
Orion	Jr. High	Harrisville	Titans	Scott Elliott	49	1,086	2003
Rocky Mountain	Jr. High	West Haven	Grizzlies	Tyler King	51	1,066	1994
Roy	Jr. High	Roy	Razorbacks	Melinda Stimpson	45	924	1956
Sand Ridge	Jr. High	Roy	Scorpions	Skylar Kendall	45	883	1970
Snowcrest	Jr. High	Eden	Skyhawks	Don Morse	20	308	1987
South Ogden	Jr. High	South Ogden	Spartans	Patrick Andrus	44	830	2010
T.H. Bell	Jr. High	Washington Terrace	Minutemen	Chris Archuleta	35	631	1963
Wahlquist	Jr. High	Farr West	Eagles	Rich Murray	51	1,060	2014
Bonneville	High School (5A)	Washington Terrace	Lakers	Nick Harris	76	1,366	1960
Fremont	High School (6A)	Plain City	Silverwolves	Quinn Talbot	96	2,000	1994
Roy	High School (5A)	Roy	Royals	Brenda Hart	89	1,754	1965
Weber	High School (6A)	North Ogden	Warriors	Ryan Kachold	97	1,994	1973
West Field	High School (4A) ^{[A]}	Taylor	Longhorns	Michael Martini	^{[A]}	1226	2024
Weber Innovations	High School^{[B]}	Ogden		Nicki Slaugh		287	2015
Two Rivers	High School^{[C]}	Ogden		Teri Spiers	27	193	2004
Weber Online	Online			Jennifer Boyer-Thurgood			

^{A} Demographics are not available for the pilot school year
^{B} Magnet school
^{C} Alternative school

== Technology ==
All schools have at least 2 computer labs, while all teachers can have access to computers in their classroom. Chromebooks and iPads are used to foster learning in many different classes. All students and teachers have their personal emails and are connected to the district's Active Directory database. Students' grades are accessible via the LANSA-built MyWeber. As of 2018, the district is moving forward with an initiative to pair students with an individual Chromebook; this program is called One-to-One.

== See also ==
- List of school districts in Utah
- Ogden City School District
