= Apple Valley, Utah =

Town in the state of Utah, United States

Apple Valley
- Town
- Location in Washington County and the state of Utah

- Location within Utah Location within the United States Location within North America
- Coordinates: 37°04′33″N 113°05′27″W
- Country: United States
- State: Utah
- County: Washington
- Incorporated: October 15, 2004; 21 years ago

Government
  - Mayor: Mike Farrar

Area
  - Total: 39.74 sq mi (102.93 km^{2})
  - Land: 39.74 sq mi (102.93 km^{2})
  - Water: 0 sq mi (0.00 km^{2})
- Elevation: 4,961 ft (1,512 m)

Population (2020)
  - Total: 855
  - Estimate (2019): 844
  - Density: 21/sq mi (8.2/km^{2})
- Time zone: UTC-7 (Mountain (MST))
  - Summer (DST): UTC-6 (MDT)
- ZIP code: 84737
- Area code: 435
- GNIS feature ID: 2412373
- Website: www.applevalleyut.gov

Apple Valley is a town in Washington County, Utah, United States, located 12 miles (19 km) east of Hurricane along SR-59. The population was 855 at the 2020 census.

Apple Valley was incorporated on October 15, 2004, and a 2007 population estimate by the US Census Bureau placed its population at 427. In 2006, some town residents signed a petition calling for disincorporation, saying its incorporation was premature. They obtained enough signatures to call for a vote of dis-incorporation, but the attempt was unsuccessful. Another dis-incorporation vote took place on June 19, 2012, but was also unsuccessful.

== Demographics ==
Historical population
Census	Pop.	Note	%±
2010	701		—
2020	855		22.0%
U.S. Decennial Census

As of the census of 2010, 701 people were living in the town. There were 295 housing units. The racial makeup of the town was 94.3% White, 3.0% American Indian and Alaska Native, 0.1% Asian, 1.3% from some other race, and 1.3% from two or more races. Hispanic or Latino of any race were 3.3% of the population.
