= KUED =

PBS member station in Salt Lake City

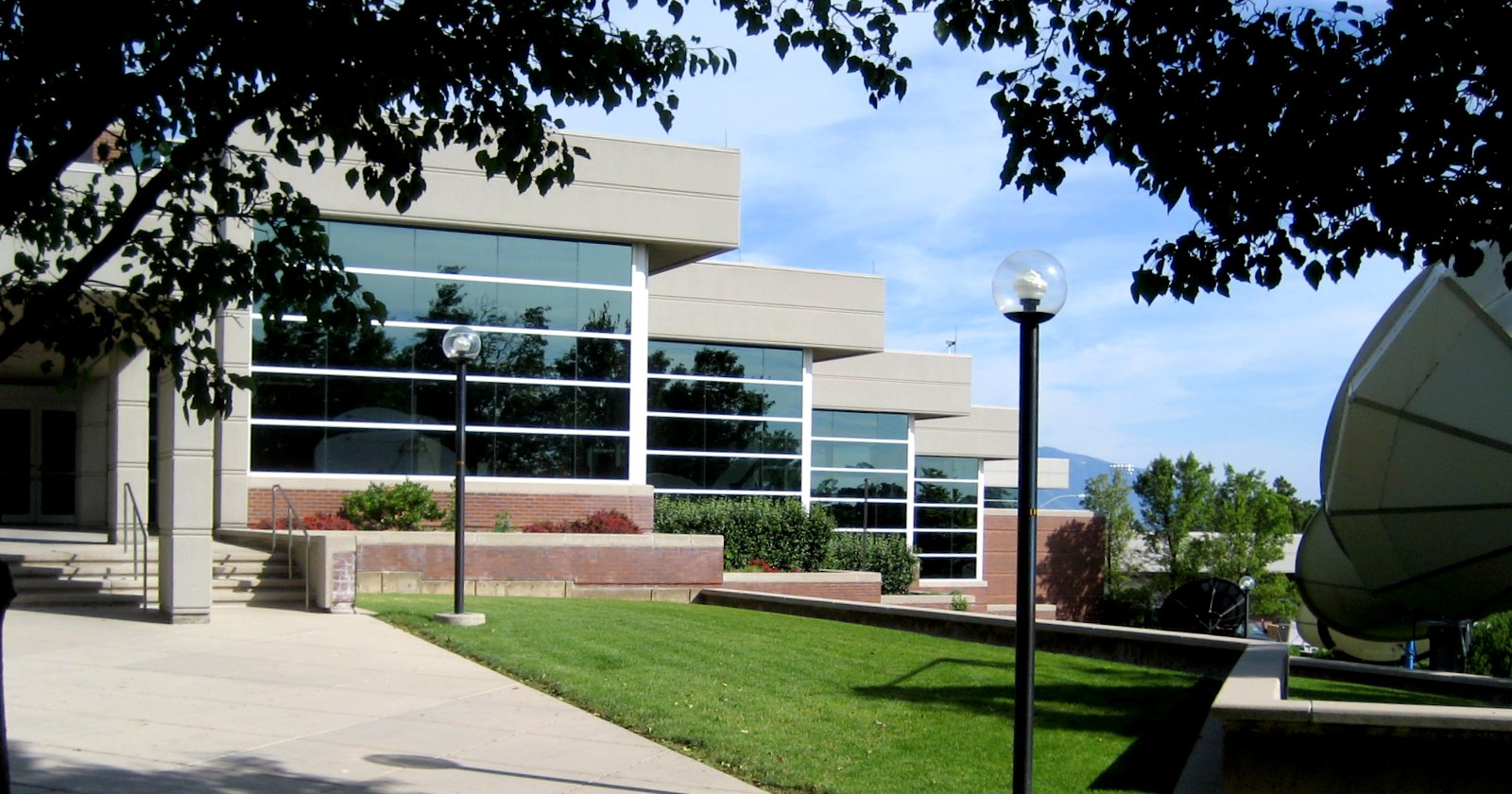
- The Eccles Broadcast Center on the University of Utah campus houses KUED's broadcast operations.
- Salt Lake City, Utah; United States
- Channels: Digital: 27 (UHF); Virtual: 7
- Branding: PBS Utah

Programming
- Affiliations: 7.1: PBS; for others, see § Subchannels

Ownership
- Owner: University of Utah
- Sister stations: KUEN; KUER-FM; KUUB

History
- First air date: January 20, 1958
- Former call signs: KUTA (CP, 1956–1957)
- Former channel numbers: Analog: 7 (VHF, 1958–2009); Digital: 42 (UHF, 2002–2018)
- Former affiliations: NET (1958–1970)
- Call sign meaning: Utah Education

Technical information
- Licensing authority: FCC
- Facility ID: 69396
- ERP: 374 kW
- HAAT: 1,266 m (4,154 ft)
- Transmitter coordinates: 40°39′33″N 112°12′10″W
- Translator(s): see § Satellite stations and translators

Links
- Public license information: Public file; LMS
- Website: www.pbsutah.org

KUED (channel 7), branded as PBS Utah, is a PBS member television station in Salt Lake City, Utah, United States. It is owned by the University of Utah (U of U) alongside KUEN (channel 9) and public radio stations KUER-FM (90.1 MHz) and KUUB (88.3 FM). The four outlets share studios at the Eccles Broadcast Center on the U of U campus on South Wasatch Drive in the northeastern section of Salt Lake City; KUED's transmitter is located on Farnsworth Peak in the Oquirrh Mountains, southwest of Salt Lake City. KUED has a large network of broadcast translators that extend its over-the-air coverage throughout Utah.

Prior to July 2018, KUED was one of two PBS member stations serving Utah, the other being Provo-based KBYU-TV (channel 11), owned by Brigham Young University. In October 2017, it was announced that KBYU would drop PBS programming on June 30, 2018, in favor of its own BYUtv service, leaving KUED as the sole PBS station for the state.

== History ==
Logo as "KUED 7"; used until November 24, 2019.

The station first signed on the air on January 20, 1958, with an episode of The Friendly Giant. The station originally broadcast from improvised studios set up in the basement of the old student union building on the University of Utah campus. The station had humble beginnings with no props, primitive equipment, and a donated transmitter, courtesy of Time-Life Inc., then-owner of KTVT (channel 4, now KTVX). A $100,000 grant from the Ford Foundation made it possible from KUED to sign on the air.

Early programming was purely educational, in some cases consisting of nothing more than a teacher standing in front of a chalk board and lecturing. About half of the programs aired were locally produced, with the rest coming from National Educational Television (NET) and other sources. When PBS succeeded NET in 1970, the focus of programming changed to educational and entertainment programming.

For most of the time from 1961 to 1988, KUED was the default NET/PBS member station for most of Montana; cable systems in most of the state from Butte eastward piped in KUED. When KUSM signed on from Bozeman as the first public television station in Montana, it simulcast KUED for PBS programming for its first three years on the air as part of a partnership between the U of U and KUSM's owner, Montana State University. This gave KUSM time to train its staff and build local support. In 1988, TCI Cable, which by then had become the dominant cable provider in most of Montana, began phasing out KUED, with KUSM completely replacing KUED across TCI's footprint by 1990.

After having branded with its call letters and channel number for virtually its entire history, KUED announced on November 4, 2019, that it would rebrand as "PBS Utah" on November 25, adopting the updated national PBS logo and branding that was unveiled the same day.

== Technical information ==
=== Subchannels ===
The stations' signals are multiplexed:

Subchannels of KUED, KUES, and KUEW
| Subchannel | | | Res. | Short name | Programming |
| KUED | KUES | KUEW | Res. | Short name | Programming |
|---|---|---|---|---|---|
| 7.1 | 19.1 | 18.1 | 1080i | KUED-HD | PBS |
| 7.2 | 19.2 | 18.2 | 480i | World | World |
| 7.3 | 19.3 | 18.3 | 480i | Kids | PBS Kids |
| 7.4 | 19.4 | 18.4 | 480i | Create | Create |
| 7.6 | 19.6 | 18.6 | 480i | KUUB-FM | Audio (simulcast of KUUB) |
| 7.7 | 19.7 | 18.7 | 480i | KUER-FM | Audio (simulcast of KUER-FM) |

On March 7, 2017, KUED replaced V-me on digital 7.3 with PBS Kids.

On December 29, 2017, KUED added Create on digital subchannel 7.4.

=== Analog-to-digital conversion ===
KUED shut down its analog signal, over VHF channel 7, on June 12, 2009, as part of the federally mandated transition from analog to digital television. The station's digital signal remained on its pre-transition UHF channel 42, using virtual channel 7.

=== Satellite stations and translators ===
KUED has two full power satellites serving rural areas of Utah, both digital-only:

| Station | City of license | Channel RF / VC | First air date | ERP | HAAT | Facility ID | Transmitter coordinates | Public license information |
|---|---|---|---|---|---|---|---|---|
| KUES^{1} | Richfield | 19 (UHF); 19 | 2000 | 0.33 kW | 441 m (1,447 ft) | 82576 | 38°38′3.9″N 112°3′35.7″W | Public file; LMS |
| KUEW | St. George | 18 (UHF); 18 | 2002 | 1.62 kW | 66.5 m (218.2 ft) | 82585 | 37°3′49.9″N 113°34′22.8″W | Public file; LMS |

Notes:

- 1. KUES used the callsign KAVT during its construction permit from September 15 to November 3, 1997.

Aside from their transmitters, KUES and KUEW do not maintain any physical presence in their cities of license.

Additionally, KUED can be seen on over 85 translator stations covering all of Utah, plus parts of Arizona, Idaho, Nevada and Wyoming.

- Preston, ID: K04RX-D
- Cedar City: K07GQ-D
- Blanding–Monticello: K07ZU-D
- Beaver, etc.: K07ZY-D
- Laketown, etc.: K08PW-D
- Mink Creek, ID: K09YP-D
- Long Valley Junction: K09ZK-D
- Helper: K09ZV-D
- Salina–Redmond: K10RH-D
- Marysvale: K10RI-D
- Woodland–Kamas: K10RJ-D
- East East Price: K10RL-D
- Roosevelt, etc.: K10RO-D
- Rural Juab, etc.: K11XD-D
- Mexican Hat: K14QC-D
- Mayfield: K14RJ-D
- Leamington: K14RP-D
- Spring Glen: K14RU-D
- Wendover: K15GZ-D
- Circleville: K15KX-D
- Cortez, etc., CO: K15MJ-D
- Evanston, etc., WY: K16HW-D
- Hildale: K16II-D
- Hatch: K16MB-D
- Montezuma Creek–Aneth: K17IH-D
- Rural Sevier County: K17MU-D
- Torrey: K17MZ-D
- Panguitch: K17NA-D
- Henrieville: K17NB-D
- Koosharem: K17ND-D
- Columbia, etc.: K17NP-D
- Fruitland: K17NY-D
- Green River: K18IT-D
- Rural Garfield: K18MH-D
- Orangeville, etc.: K18MX-D
- Malad: K18NC-D
- Navajo Mountain School, etc.: K19HA-D
- Oljeto: K19HB-D
- Milford, etc.: K20GH-D
- Tabiona–Myton: K20NU-D
- Beryl–Modena, etc.: K21EI-D
- Apple Valley: K21IL-D
- Bluff, etc.: K21KC-D
- Summit County: K21MU-D
- Mount Pleasant: K22FW-D
- Mexican Hat: K22IG-D
- Virgin: K22IP-D
- Orderville: K22LW-D
- Fishlake Resort: K23KP-D
- Fillmore, etc.: K27JT-D
- Morgan, etc.: K27NH-D
- Enterprise: K17NL-D
- Wanship: K28JR-D
- Coalville: K28OT-D
- Parowna–Enoch, etc.: K28OW-D
- Kanab: K29MH-D
- Kanarraville–New Harmony: K29ML-D
- Washington, etc.: K30OL-D
- Montpelier, ID: K30OX-D
- Cedar Canyon: K31EI-D
- Nephi: K31LC-D
- Peoa–Oakley: K31NK-D
- Hanksville: K31NU-D
- Randolph: K31OB-D
- Vernal, etc.: K32HV-D
- Henefer, etc.: K32IS-D
- Delta–Oak City, etc.: K32MI-D
- Logan: K32MW-D
- Toquerville: K32NC-D
- Clear Creek: K32NI-D
- Manti–Ephraim: K33FT-D
- Heber–Midway: K33FX-D
- LeChee, etc., AZ: K33IY-D
- Rockville–Springdale: K33JW-D
- Duchesne: K33LA-D
- Antimony: K33OO-D
- Escalante: K33OQ-D
- Emery: K33PJ-D
- Green River: K33PK-D
- Ferron: K33PN-D
- Huntington: K33PP-D
- Fremont: K33OL-D
- Boulder: K34IY-D
- Manila, etc.: K34JD-D
- Rural Garfield County: K34NW-D
- Caineville: K34OF-D
- Park City: K34OJ-D
- Samak: K34ON-D
- Huntsville, etc.: K35GG-D
- Preston, ID: K35GJ-D
- Hanna–Tabiona: K35IJ-D
- Garrison, etc.: K35IR-D
- Scofield: K35JJ-D
- Fountain Green: K35JK-D
- Cannonville: K35NK-D
- Alton, etc.: K36NO-D

== Related stations ==
- KUEN (formerly branded as UEN-TV)
- KUER
