= Ogden City School District =

School district in Ogden, Utah

Ogden School District

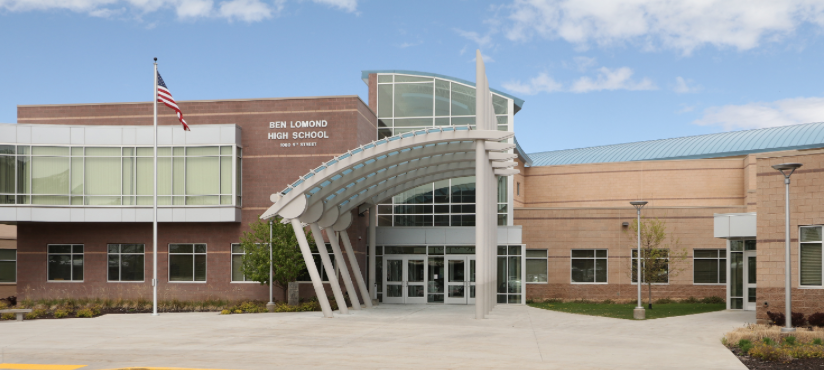
Ben Lomond High School

The Ogden City School District is the school district serving Ogden, Utah, United States. The superintendent, as of July 2021, is Luke Rasmussen. The district was established in 1849. It is an inner-city district, enriched by multicultural diversity. It operates 13 elementary schools, three junior high schools, two comprehensive high schools, an alternative high school and a Youth In Care (YIC) program which serves students from all parts of Utah.

Its boundary is that of the city.

== History ==
The Ogden School District was established in 1849.

Ogden High School was built in its current location in 1937, and was one of the first high school buildings that cost over $1 million.

Ben Lomond High School was established in 1952. It was named for the Ben Lomond Peak, which Scottish immigrants named because it reminded them of the Ben Lomond Mountains in Scotland.

In 2006, the District funded the renovation of Ben Lomond High School and Ogden High School using a bond. Construction on both projects began in 2007. Ben Lomond's project finished in August 2010, while Ogden High's renovation concluded in 2012.

Both of the renovations were well received. The Ogden School District and Ben Lomond High School were recognized and awarded with the Mountain States Construction Silver Award in 2010, while Ogden High School's renovation received a preservation award from the National Trust for Historic Preservation.

== Schools ==
=== High schools ===
- Ben Lomond High School
- Ogden High School
- George Washington High School

=== Junior high schools ===
- Highland Junior High is a secondary school serving the northern third of the city of Ogden
- Mound Fort Junior High is a secondary school located in the central part of Ogden
- Mount Ogden Junior High is a secondary school serving the southern part of Ogden

=== Elementary schools ===
- Bonneville Elementary School
- East Ridge Elementary School
- Heritage Elementary School
- Hillcrest Elementary School
- Lincoln Elementary School
- James Madison Elementary School
- New Bridge Elementary School
- Odyssey Elementary School
- Polk Elementary School
- Shadow Valley Elementary School
- Taylor Canyon Elementary School
- T.O. Smith Elementary School
- Wasatch Elementary School
