= Juab, Utah =

Town in Juab County, Utah, United States

Coordinates: 39°31′11″N 111°56′26″W

Juab (/ˈdʒuːæb/ JOO-ab) is a ghost town in Juab County, Utah, United States. It lies at an elevation of 5,082 feet (1,549 m), and is 5.1 miles (8.2 km) west-southwest of Levan.

== History ==
Juab was originally called Chicken Creek, and under the latter name was settled in 1860.

Juab was a railroad station and was the end of the line of the Union Pacific Railroad subsidiary, the Utah Southern Railroad in 1879. The rails were advanced to Milford in 1880 by the Utah Southern Railroad Extension. By the end of the century, the rails and station were part of the Oregon Short Line Railroad, a larger Union Pacific Railroad subsidiary. In 1903, the rails and station became part of the San Pedro, Los Angeles and Salt Lake Railroad.
