= Beryl, Utah =

Unincorporated community in the state of Utah, United States

- Unincorporated community
- Location of Beryl within the State of Utah Beryl (the United States)
- Coordinates: 37°53′45″N 113°39′41″W
- Country: United States
- State: Utah
- County: Iron
- Named after: Beryl
- Elevation: 5,154 ft (1,571 m)
- Time zone: UTC-7 (Mountain (MST))
  - Summer (DST): UTC-6 (MDT)
- ZIP codes: 84714
- Area code: 435
- GNIS feature ID: 1437500

Beryl (/ˈbɜːrəl/ BUR-əl) is an unincorporated community in west-central Iron County, Utah, United States.

== Description ==
Historical population
Census	Pop.	Note	%±
1940	122		—
1950	239		95.9%
Source: U.S. Census Bureau

The community has one school, Escalante Valley Elementary, and it is part of the Iron County School District. Originally established as a Union Pacific Railroad siding, Beryl was named in 1901 after the semi-precious stone beryl found in the area.

The 2012 Beryl (ZIP 84714), population is 944. There are 2 people per square mile (population density). The median age is 31.6. The US median is 37.3. 57.63% of people in Beryl are married. 9.86% are divorced. The average household size is 3.13 people. 40.54% of people are married, with children. 6.31% have children, but are single.

== Climate ==
According to the Köppen Climate Classification system, Beryl has a semi-arid climate, abbreviated "BSk" on climate maps.
