= Chandler High School (Arizona) =

Location
- 350 North Arizona Avenue; Chandler, Maricopa County, Arizona; United States; 33°18′32″N 111°50′35″W

Information
- Type: Public
- Established: 1912; 114 years ago
- Status: Currently operational
- Locale: Suburb: Large (21)
- School district: Chandler Unified School District
- NCES District ID: 0401870
- CEEB code: 030045
- NCES School ID: 040187000123
- Principal: Greg Milbrandt
- Teaching staff: 175.46 (FTE)
- Grades: 9-12
- Enrollment: 3,487 (2023-2024)
- Student to teacher ratio: 19.87
- Colors: Royal blue and white
- Athletics conference: 6A
- Mascot: Wolves
- Newspaper: Wolf Howl
- Yearbook: El Lobo
- Website: www.cusd80.com/CHS
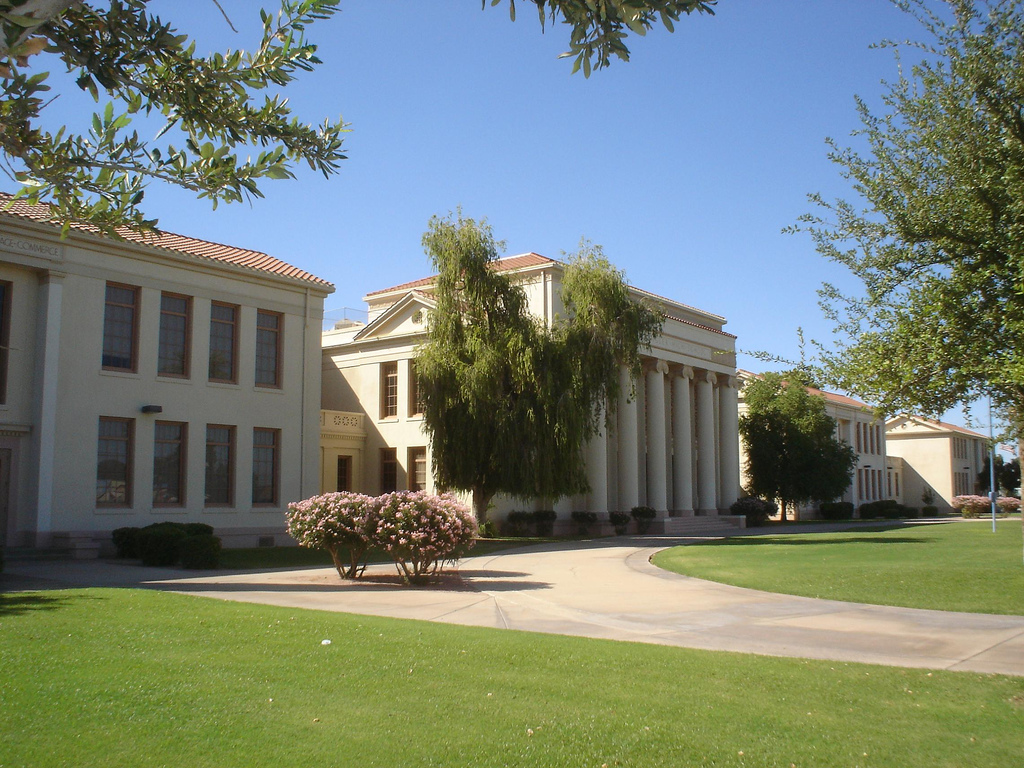
- The "Old Main" buildings at the Chandler HS Campus
- Chandler High School
- U.S. National Register of Historic Places
- Location within Arizona Location within the United States
- Location: 350 N. Arizona Ave. Chandler, Arizona
- Built: 1921
- Built by: Broman & Chapman
- Architects: Allison & Allison (main building); Orville A. Bell (1939 gymnasium)
- Architectural style: Classical Revival, Mission/Spanish Revival
- NRHP reference No.: 07000836
- Added to NRHP: November 20, 2007

Chandler High School is a high school and historical landmark located in Chandler, Arizona, United States. It is one of Arizona's largest high schools with an enrollment of 3,000 to 4,000 students annually.

== History ==
According to published records, the earliest known educational facility in the city dates back to 1907. It featured rooms constructed in a canvas-style design. The second facility was known as the Chandler Grammar School, later changed to the Cleveland School, was opened June 21, 1912, at the cost of $9,000. Both prior schools accepted 6-8 grade students. In September 1914, a more permanent solution was purposed requiring a 1919 bond of $121,800 and 1921 bond of $170,000 to begin planning and construction of a high school.

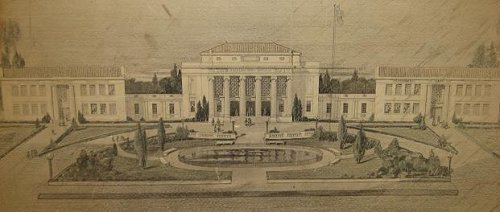
The initial architectural sketch of Chandler High School submitted by Allison & Allison in 1921.

Breaking ground in 1921 and dedicated the subsequent year, the facility currently referred to as Old Main, was constructed along with a small gymnasium. Both structures were placed on the National Register of Historic Places in 2007, 1 of 17 high schools in Phoenix. Several expansions and upgrades have been made to the campus which resides on the Northwest corner of Arizona Avenue/SR 87 and Chandler Blvd.

The school and subsequent city's namesake comes from founder Dr. Alexander John "A.J." Chandler a local veterinary surgeon.

== Academics ==
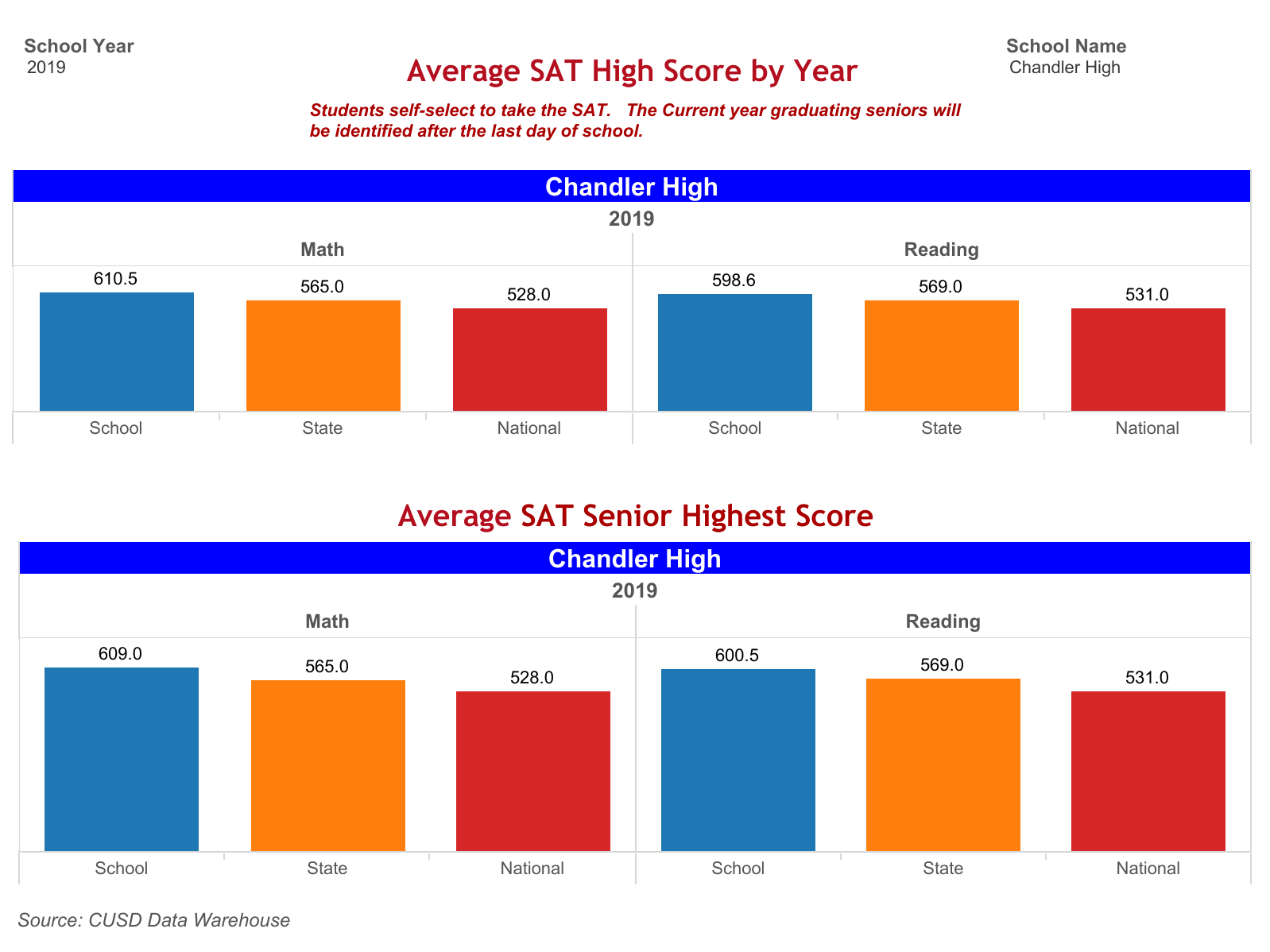
2019 SAT Performance

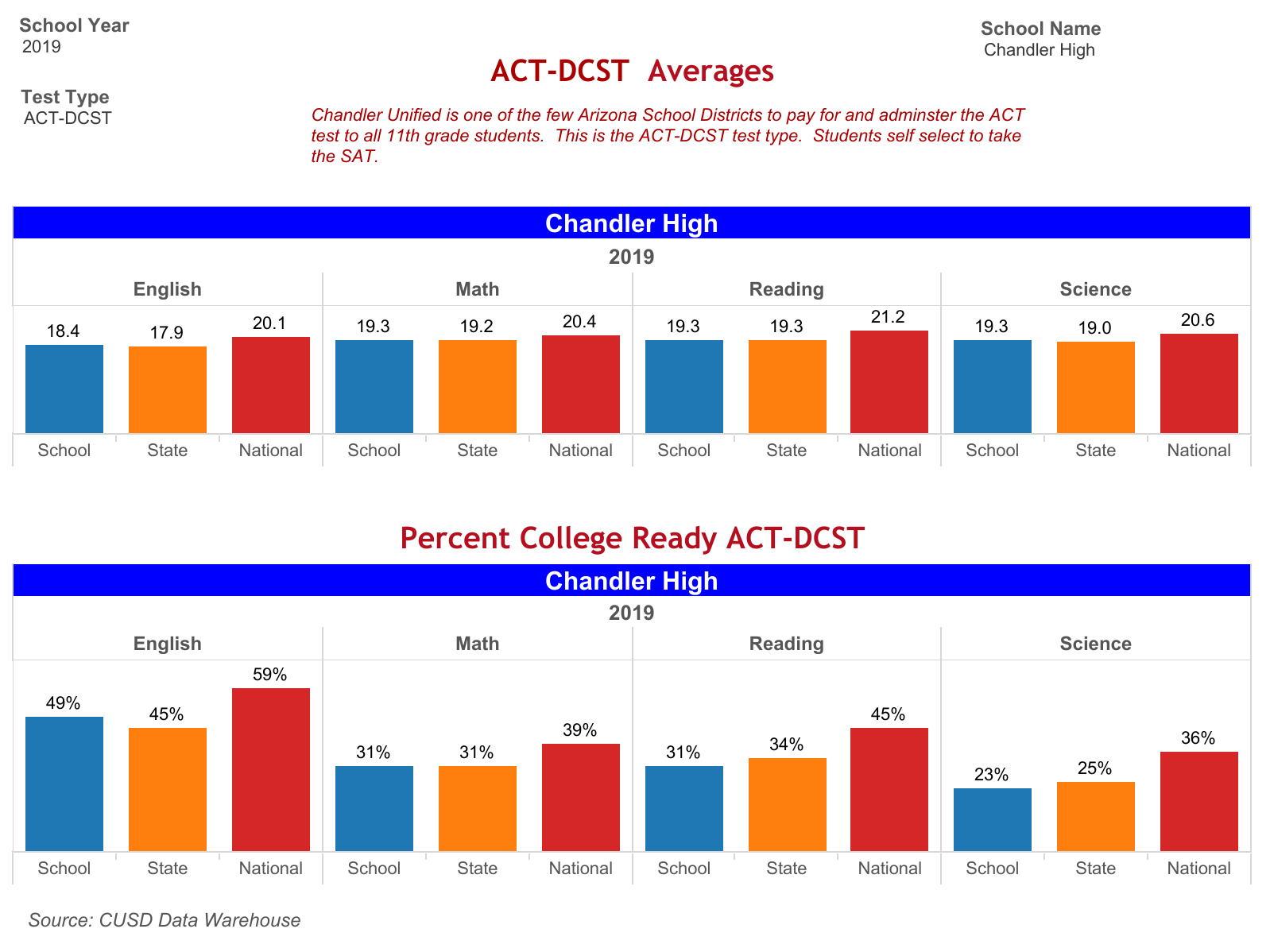
2019 ACT Performance

Chandler abides by the standards set by the Arizona Department of Education and implements the state's Education and Career Action Plan (ECAP) required for all students 9-12 grade students to graduate from a public Arizona high school. CUSD high schools also implements an open enrollment policy, meaning students from outside the intended school boundaries may attend without tuition or other penalties.

Arizona requires that all high school students take 6 credit bearing courses during their freshmen through junior years, and have the option of reducing credits to 4 credit bearing courses if they are track for graduation. However, CUSD requires all students must complete 22 credits whereas the public university system controlled by the Arizona Board of Regents requires only 16 credits in the following areas:

- English - 4 credits
- Mathematics - 4 credits
- Science - 3 credits
- Social Studies. - 3 credits
- Career and Technical Educator/Fine Arts - 1 credit
- Physical Education - 1 credit
- Comprehensive Health - ½ credits
- Elective Courses - 5 ½ credits

=== Cross-credit courses ===
At Chandler and all CUSD high school students may swap three semesters (1/2 credits per semester) of Spiritline, Beginning through Advance Dance, Drill Team, Color Guard, Marching Band, Winter guard, or AFJROTC essentially waiving the required one Physical Education credit required for graduation.

Students which choose applied sciences in areas such as Applied Biology or Applied Agricultural Sciences gain equivalent Science credits. Likewise, Economics credits can be awarded like Agricultural Business Management, Business, Business Applications, Marketing, Economics Applications, Family and Consumer Sciences, and vocational courses.

Community college credits can be awarded through a partnership with Chandler-Gilbert Community College (CGCC) and cooperative credits for vocational courses are provided by East Valley Institute of Technology (EVIT). Students must be dually enrolled for the Arizona community college or the Arizona public university system to accept the credits towards a degree. CUSD Transportation Department provides routes between Chandler, EVIT, and CGCC with after school hours transportation intended for students participating in activities.

Advanced Placement (AP) courses are available on school grounds in Mathematics, English, Social Studies, and Science which garner university credits nationwide and is 1 of 8 Arizona high schools offering the International Baccalaureate Diploma Programme.

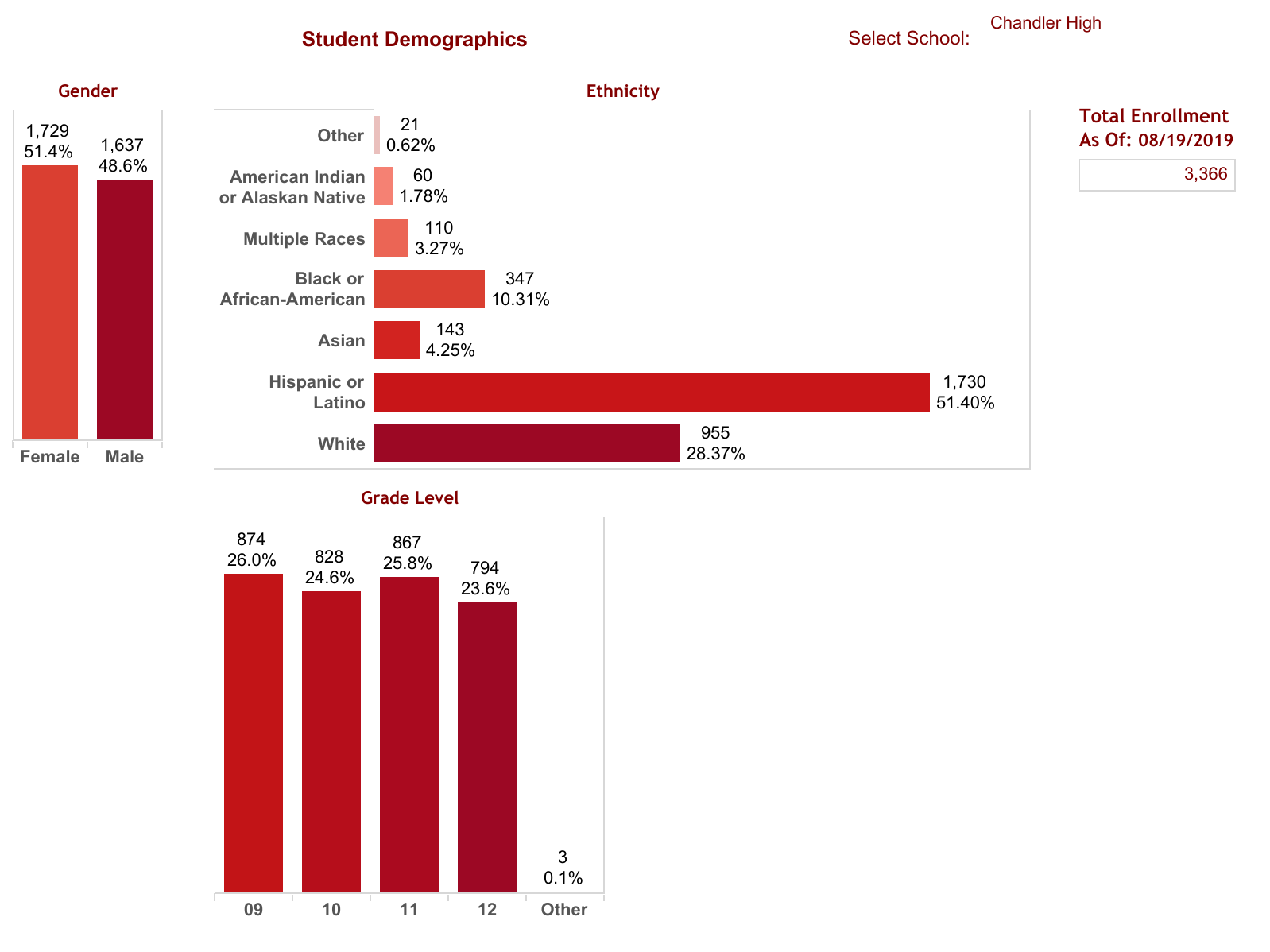
Chandler High School's Demographics

=== Accolades ===
Chandler was awarded the Blue Ribbon School during 1982-83 and 1986-87 school years. It has also received 10 A+ School of Excellence from the Arizona Education Foundation, the most in the state.

=== Statistics ===
Chandler has 1,218 students enrolled in the Free Lunch Program, 197 for the Reduced-price Lunch Program, and 610 that are Directly Certified under the National School Lunch Program.

== Athletics ==
Chandler is an Arizona Interscholastic Association (AIA) member school offering boys and girls sports adhering to Chandler Unified School Dirstrict (CUSD) Title IX compliance. Student athletes can participate in varsity, junior varsity, and freshmen only teams as well as individual sports under the AIA's 6A Conference. Chandler Athletics consist of these sports:

- Badminton (Girls)
- Baseball
- Basketball (Boys and Girls)
- Cheer (Girls and Coed)
- Cross Country (Boys and Girls)†
- Flag football
- Football
- Golf (Boys and Girls)†
- Hockey Competitive
- Lacrosse (Boys and Girls)
- Pomline
- Soccer (Boys and Girls)
- Softball
- Swim and Dive (Boys and Girls)†
- Tennis (Boys and Girls)†
- Track and field (Boys and Girls)†
- Volleyball (Boys and Girls)
- Wrestling (Boys and Girls)

† denotes individual and team sports

Each sport is funded by the school, yet additional funds are raised through boosters creating 501(c)(3) non-profit organization, donations, and tax credits.

=== Baseball ===
Coach	Seasons	W	L	T	Pct.	State Title	Runners-up	Region Title	Notes
Mike Johnson	2004-05	24	29	0	.452	0	0	0	
Jon Watson	2006-08	60	37	0	.618	0	0	0	
Jeff Tallman	2009-10	24	34	0	.413	0	0	0	
Total		108	100	0	.519	0	0	0	

=== Basketball ===
==== Boys ====
Coach	Seasons	W	L	T	Pct.	State Title	Runners-up	Region Title	Notes
Mike Ellsworth	2012-13	95	154	0	.381	0	0	0	
Kyle Darr	2013-					0	0	0	
Total						0	0	0	

===== Quilters Flyers Scandal =====
In January 2010, Head Varsity Coach Mike Ellsworth was suspended from coaching the team, but was allowed to continue teaching, after making flyers naming 4 student athletes as "quitters". These flyers were posted throughout the locker room and the school. The 4 students in question, left the team after poor team performance. Ellsworth would ultimately resign from coaching at Chandler.

=== Football ===
Coach	Seasons	W	L	T	Pct.	State Title	Runners-up	Open Division Title^{†}	Open Division Runners-up^{†}	Open Division Semifinals^{†}	Open Division Birth^{†}	Region Title	Notes
Jim Ewan	1997–2005	54	27	0	.666	0	0	-	-	-	-	0	
Shaun Aguano	2006–17	88	19	0	.822	4	1	-	-	-	-	5	
Rick Garretson	2017	57	13	0	.814	2	1	1	0	4	4	2	Record sixth straight big school championships
Ty Wisdom	2018–2023	10	3	0	.698	0	0	0	1	1	1	0	
Total		215	42	0	.836	7	8	0	0	1	4	7	AIA Football Championship Records
† denotes the inception starting during the 2022–23 season by the AIA.

In 2014, Chandler football won its first championship after defeating their rival Hamilton High School Division I State Championship game. Starting in 2016 Chandler won three consecutive championship in the AIA's largest division, the last being in the open bracket comprising the eight best teams in Arizona according to the MaxPreps rating system. The team has been ranked as high as 12th nationally according to the 2015 MaxPreps' Xcelent 25 Rankings and finished on the list 3 times. Aguano resigned as head football coach in 2018 for Arizona State University's running backs coach vacating the position for offensive coordinator Rick Garretson which had a 13-0 first season and a state championship.

Chandler has successfully competed against the top teams in the nation. They start with a 2013 loss to #1 St. John Bosco High School at home 52–13. The 2014 team was able to get their first out of state victory against Valor Christian High School with a final score of 22–7. Traveling into Las Vegas, Nevada during the 2015 season ranked 20th nationally played in a high-profile game against #3 Bishop Gorman High School losing 35-14 which was broadcast on ESPNU. Chandler also hosted #2 IMG Academy going into the game ranked 7th ultimately losing 27–14 in 2017. The team went on the road the next two years playing Las Vegas' Faith Lutheran High School and Capital Christian High School winning 35-21 and 56-0 respectively. Overall Chandler has a 3–3 record against out of state opponents.

=== Fine arts ===
Chandler High School is also notable for its active and competitive music programs. Chandler High School Chorale was the first American high school to be invited to perform at the 2005 Jilin College of the Arts Summer Music Festival in Changchun, People's Republic of China, and not only once, but twice to perform at Carnegie Hall for a festival, while Chandler High School's Wolf Pack Pride Marching Band competed in the 2005-2006 Fiesta Bowl National Band Championship, placing fifth. The marching band competed again in the 2008-2009 Championship. The Symphonic Band also competed April 2006 in Boston at the Boston Symphony Hall in the Heritage Festival of Gold. The band took fourth. The Symphonic Band competed again in April 2008 at the Davies Symphony Hall in San Francisco, taking first. In 2009, the Symphonic Band returned (for its third time) to the Festival of Gold in Los Angeles where it again took first place over groups from across the nation. In 2010, Chandler's Chorale visited the Festival of Gold, taking first as well. Chandler High's Varsity Jazz Ensemble has recently excelled on a local level.

In addition, Chandler's theater department has performed several well-known plays, including from Charlie and the Chocolate Factory, Outsiders, Miser, Rebel Without a Cause, Footloose, Still Life With Iris, and many more. The Chandler theatre has been to the Central Arizona Acting Festival and many students received Superior. A.P.A.C. (Advanced Pantomime And Characterization), the highest level acting class at Chandler, has performed numerous books for elementary students through Bookends, a program designed to promote literacy, for many years.

=== Rivalry ===
A rivalry developed between Chandler and Hamilton High School which are separated by 4 miles (6.4 km) along Arizona Avenue/SR 87. Local media has since daubed this high-profile competition as the "Battle of Arizona Avenue". The annual varsity football matchup gains the most attention where the highly rated players are often recruited by college football coaches from across the nation. Fan turnout can exceeded 10,000 with NFL players like Anquan Boldin, Larry Fitzgerald, and Matt Leinart also in attendance. As a consistent Top 25 rivalry, the GEICO High School Bowl Series has been instrumental in broadcast the game nationally by ESPN, ESPNU, and the NFHS Network. Every year the game would alternate form Chandler's Austin Field to Hamilton's Jerry Looper Stadium. Hamilton began matchup with a 17-game win streak of until the 2013 regular season matchup gave Chandler their first win 26–16. Chandler would later fall in a 2013 5A Division I State Semifinal matchup to Hamilton 21–17 at the approved Arizona Interscholastic Association neutral field at Highland High School. Since 2014 Chandler has won six consecutive games. As of 2020, Hamilton leads the series 18–8 with a potential rematch during the 2020 Open Bracket, which contains 8 of the highest ranked teams. Together, the two school account for 12 Big School State Championships in football.

As the rivalry developed beyond football, both school's athletic teams and other activities have become very competitive. Chandler city officials and other organizations have help facilitate and advance the rivalry. The most notable addition was the Chandler Rotary Club providing the trophy where brass plate are inscribed with the victors name and date with a custom street sign labeled "Arizona Ave Champions" affixed on top. They also host a luncheon with school staff, administrators, and inductees to the Chandler Sports Hall of Fame.

Since the rivalry garners so much attention, administrations of both schools and the district have worked closely with school resource officers with all Chandler Unified School District privately contracted security guards ensuring the stadiums and surrounding areas remain secure. The Chandler Police Department has also provided social media monitoring leading up to the game.

== In popular culture ==
On February 18, 2009, TV Land's High School Reunion began its second season featuring a cast from Chandler High School's 1988 class. Bob Caccamo, the principal during 1988, aided producers in finding former students saying, "We are looking for a variety of people." The show was not well received as producers allegedly filled the remaining cast members with actors for the means of developing drama. The cast felt they were made into caricatures and situations felt awkward.

== Notable alumni ==
- Adam Archuleta - football player
- Eddie Basha Jr. - Businessman - Bashas' Inc.
- Sanjay Beach - football player
- N'Keal Harry - football player
- Alexa Havins - Actress - film and television
- Brett Hundley - football player
- Cameron Jordan - football player
- Dion Jordan - football player
- Casey Likes - actor
- Gunner Maldonado - college football player
- Bryce Perkins - football player
- Paul Perkins - football player
- Cody Ransom - baseball player
- Derrick Richardson - football player
- Gordon Rule - football player
- Brent R. Taylor - Politician/US Military - mayor of North Ogden, Utah, Army National Guard officer
- Lindsay Taylor - basketball player
- Kennedy Urlacher - football player
- Dave Van Gorder - baseball player
- A'Mauri Washington - college football player
- Lawrence Westbrook - basketball player
- Markus Wheaton - football player
- Eddie Wilson - football player
- Dustin Woodard - football player
