= Liberty, Utah =

Liberty
- CDP
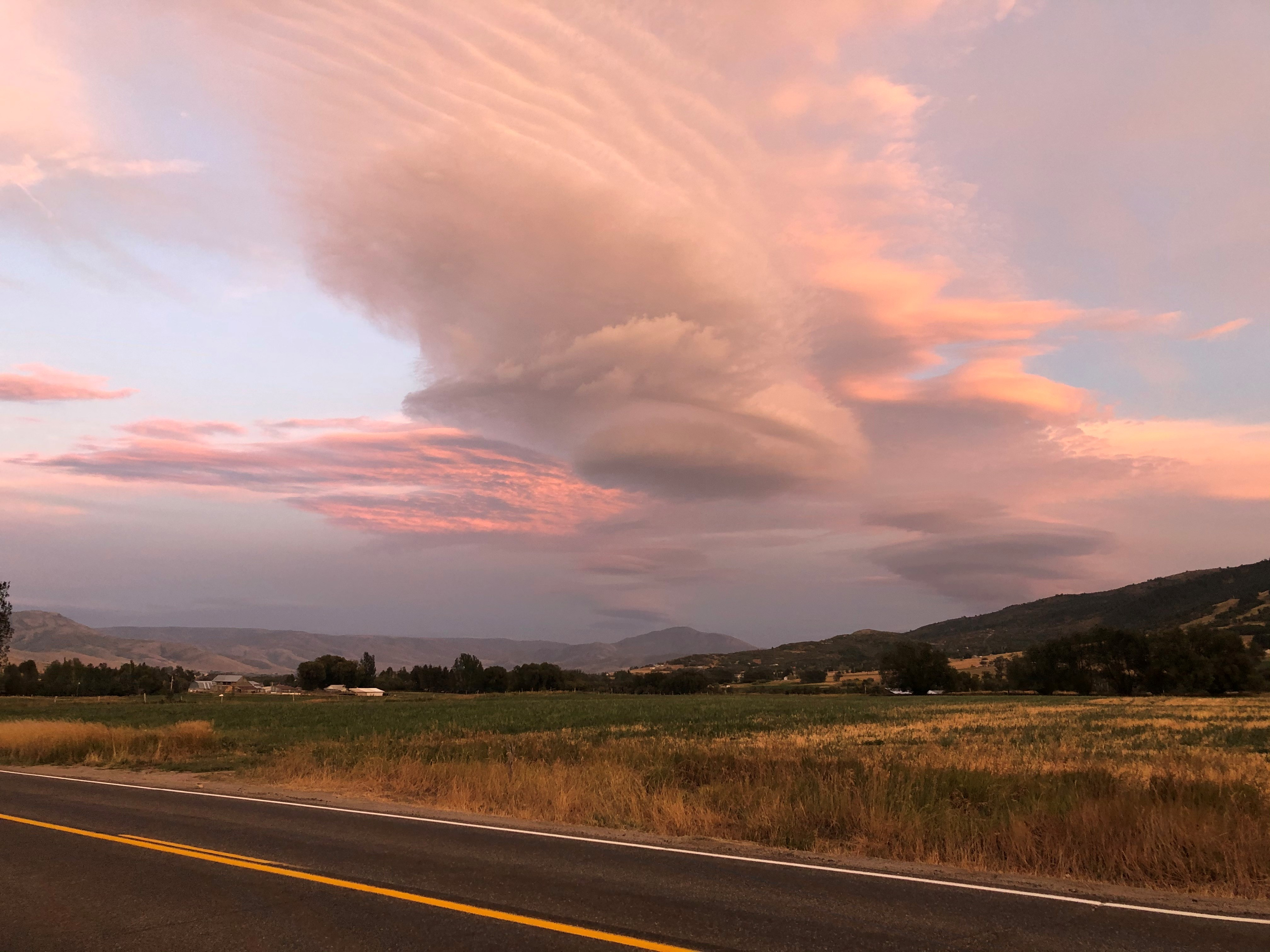
- Looking down the Ogden Valley across a ranch field in Liberty. Durst Mountain (Morgan County) is in the background.

- Location in Weber County and the state of Utah
- Coordinates: 41°21′30″N 111°53′03″W
- Country: United States
- State: Utah
- County: Weber
- Settled: 1859

Area
  - Total: 5.9 sq mi (15 km^{2})
  - Land: 5.9 sq mi (15 km^{2})
  - Water: 0.0 sq mi (0 km^{2})
- Elevation: 5,171 ft (1,576 m)

Population (2020)
  - Total: 1,522
  - Density: 260/sq mi (100/km^{2})
- Time zone: UTC-7 (Mountain (MST))
  - Summer (DST): UTC-6 (MDT)
- ZIP code: 84310
- Area codes: 385, 801
- GNIS feature ID: 2584770

Liberty is a census-designated place in Weber County, Utah, United States. The population was 1,522 at the 2020 census. It is part of the Ogden–Clearfield, Utah Metropolitan Statistical Area, as well as the Ogden Valley census county division.

== Geography ==
Liberty lies in the northwestern Ogden Valley of the Wasatch Range, approximately 4 miles (6.4 km) across the North Ogden Divide and east of North Ogden and 2 miles (3.2 km) northwest of Eden. Near Liberty are Nordic Valley, Utah State Route 158, and the Nordic Valley ski resort. To the southeast, just past Eden, are Pineview Reservoir and the town of Huntsville. Avon Road, formerly State Route 162, leads north over the Avon Pass to Avon.

== History ==
British trapper and explorer Peter Skene Ogden was the first European to map and describe the "Ogden Hole" valley which would later include Liberty. The Liberty area was settled beginning in 1859 as an outgrowth of Eden. In 1892, a separate townsite was laid out and a separate ward of the Church of Jesus Christ of Latter-day Saints organized. The name came from John Freeman's remarks that both cattle and people took "full liberty" in the area.

Settlement happened gradually, homes built one at a time rather than in tract housing. Traditionally a farming and ranching community, Liberty has developed in recent years into a recreational community and commuter town for the Ogden area.

Historical population
Census	Pop.	Note	%±
1900	274		—
1910	275		0.4%
1920	252		−8.4%
1930	281		11.5%
1940	234		−16.7%
1950	196		−16.2%
2010	1,257		—
2020	1,522		21.1%
Source: U.S. Census Bureau

== Demographics ==
=== 2020 census ===
As of the 2020 census, Liberty had a population of 1,522. The median age was 40.2 years. 27.8% of residents were under the age of 18 and 14.8% of residents were 65 years of age or older. For every 100 females there were 119.3 males, and for every 100 females age 18 and over there were 117.6 males age 18 and over.

0.0% of residents lived in urban areas, while 100.0% lived in rural areas.

There were 467 households in Liberty, of which 35.3% had children under the age of 18 living in them. Of all households, 77.3% were married-couple households, 10.7% were households with a male householder and no spouse or partner present, and 9.9% were households with a female householder and no spouse or partner present. About 13.3% of all households were made up of individuals and 8.2% had someone living alone who was 65 years of age or older.

There were 534 housing units, of which 12.5% were vacant. The homeowner vacancy rate was 0.0% and the rental vacancy rate was 7.0%.

Racial composition as of the 2020 census
Race	Number	Percent
White	1,430	94.0%
Black or African American	3	0.2%
American Indian and Alaska Native	10	0.7%
Asian	8	0.5%
Native Hawaiian and Other Pacific Islander	6	0.4%
Some other race	21	1.4%
Two or more races	44	2.9%
Hispanic or Latino (of any race)	72	4.7%

=== 2010 census ===
As of the 2010 census, there were 1,257 people living in the CDP. There were 437 housing units. The racial makeup of the CDP was 96.2% White, 1.0% Asian, 0.7% American Indian and Alaska Native, 0.1% Native Hawaiian and other Pacific Islander, 0.9% from some other race, and 1.2% from two or more races. Hispanic or Latino of any race were 2.5% of the population.

== Education ==
Liberty is part of the Weber School District, but has no schools of its own. Students attend elementary and junior high schools in Eden, and Weber High School in Pleasant View.

== Notable people ==
- David Eccles, Utah's first multimillionaire; his family lived in Liberty briefly after immigrating from Scotland in 1863
- Casey Snider, member of the Utah House of Representatives

== See also ==
- List of census-designated places in Utah
