= Utah State Route 134 =

State highway in Weber County, Utah, U.S.

State Route 134
- SR-134 highlighted in red

Route information
- Maintained by UDOT
- Length: 14.304 mi (23.020 km)
- Existed: 1935 (as SR-40, renumbered in 1977)–present

Major junctions
- South end: SR-37 in Kanesville
- SR-39 in West Weber; SR-126 in Farr West; I-15 / I-84 in Farr West; US 89 in Pleasant View
- East end: SR-235 in North Ogden

Location
- Country: United States
- State: Utah

Highway system
- Utah State Highway System; Interstate; US; State; Minor; Scenic
← SR-133	→ SR-135

Utah State Route 134 (SR-134) is a state highway in the state of Utah that connects the cities of West Haven, West Weber, Plain City, Farr West, Pleasant View, and North Ogden over a distance of 14.3 miles (23.0 km) in western and northern Weber County.

== Route description ==
State Route 134 begins in the community of Kanesville (incorporated as part of the city of West Haven) as 4700 West, at its intersection with SR-37 (4000 South). From this point, it travels straight north for about 7.4 miles (11.9 km) through West Weber and into Plain City. In Plain City, the route turns east on 2200 North for about 0.4 miles (0.64 km) and again turns north on 4350 West through the middle of the city. Shortly thereafter, the route makes another jog to the east and the north before finally leaving Plain City eastward on 2600 North. The route continues eastward for its final 5.9 miles (9.5 km), passing through Farr West, passing under I-15 at an interchange, intersecting US-89 1 mile (1.6 km) later, and continuing through Pleasant View before ending in North Ogden at its intersection with SR-235 (Washington Boulevard).

== History ==
The road from Kanesville north to Plain City was first established a federal aid project in 1933, and designated a state highway in 1935 as State Route 40. The route was extended from Plain City eastward to Pleasant View in 1969. State Route 40 was renumbered to State Route 134, its current designation, in the 1977 Utah state route renumbering. The route remained unchanged until 2004, when the newly constructed roadway of 2700 North in North Ogden provided an extension to the route, taking it east to Washington Boulevard. In the process, the older road it replaced (2550 North), which had been designated as part of SR-235, was returned to local control with SR-235 being extended north 800 feet (240 m) along Washington Boulevard to meet the new terminus of SR-134.

== Major intersections ==
The entire route is in Weber County.

Location	mi	km	Destinations	Notes
West Haven	0.000	0.000	SR-37 (4000 South)	Southern terminus
West Weber	3.788	6.096	SR-39 (1150 South)	4-Way Stop
Farr West	11.243	18.094	SR-126 (2000 West)	
Farr West	11.296– 11.372	18.179– 18.301	I-15 / I-84 – Salt Lake City, Cheyenne, Tremonton	
Pleasant View	12.395	19.948	US 89	
North Ogden	14.304	23.020	SR-235 (Washington Boulevard)	Eastern terminus
1.000 mi = 1.609 km; 1.000 km = 0.621 mi
