= Nordic Valley =

Nordic Valley may refer to the following places in the United States:

- Nordic Valley, Utah
- Nordic Valley Ski Area
