= Utah State Route 235 =

State highway in Utah, United States

State Route 235
- Washington Boulevard
- SR-235 highlighted in red

Route information
- Maintained by UDOT
- Length: 3.202 mi (5.153 km)
- Existed: (1910 – 1945 as part of SR-1) 1945–present

Major junctions
- South end: US 89 in Ogden
- North end: SR-134 in North Ogden

Location
- Country: United States
- State: Utah

Highway system
- Utah State Highway System; Interstate; US; State; Minor; Scenic
← SR-232	→ SR-240

State Route 235 (SR-235), also known as Washington Boulevard, is a state highway in the U.S. state of Utah. Spanning 3.2 miles (5.1 km), it serves as a north/south minor arterial road through Weber County, connecting US-89 in Ogden to SR-134 in North Ogden.

== Route description ==
State Route 235 begins at the intersection of Washington Boulevard (US-89) and 2nd Street in Ogden. At this point, US-89 turns from its north-south routing along Washington Boulevard to the northwest along Harrisville Road while Washington continues north and becomes SR-235. Shortly after this transition, the route passes a one-way pair on the east (SR-286) servicing the Ogden–Weber Technical College. The route continues north, exiting Ogden and entering the city of North Ogden passing a number of shopping centers and suburban neighborhoods. At 2550 North, the route passes the former westbound routing of SR-235 before ending shortly after at 2600 North (SR-134).

== History ==
Washington Boulevard from Ogden through North Ogden was originally designated as part of SR-1 in 1910. This route originally continued north along Washington Boulevard before turning northwest through Pleasant View along what is now Pleasant View Drive, meeting with SR-204 near the Utah Hot Springs at the Weber County-Box Elder County border. This route became US-91 and US-30S in 1926, and the US-89 designation was added in the late 1930s. In 1945, Route 1 (as well as the US route designations) were realigned to follow the diagonal stretch of SR-204 along what is now US-89, truncating SR-204 in the process, and at the same time, SR-235 was created along the former routing of SR-1 through Pleasant View.

In 1969, at the same time as a mass-deletion of minor highways, State Route 235's northwestern stretch along Pleasant View Drive was removed from the highway system, and the route was realigned so that it now turned west in North Ogden, very near its current northern terminus. This new routing took it west along 2550 North for 1.8 miles (2.9 km) until ending at US-89. Eight years later, SR-134 was created, coming from the west along 2700 North, under Interstate 15 and ending at US-89 just north of SR-235, creating two 3-way junctions separated by 1,000 feet (300 m). As a result, travellers in this area wanting to access Interstate 15 or points west would need to travel along SR-235, turn onto US-89 for a short distance, then continue west along SR-134.

A new, wider two-lane road that extended SR-134 to the east to Washington Boulevard was built in 2004. This new road paralleled SR-235, and since there was no operational need to maintain two parallel roadways, UDOT transferred the east-west stretch of SR-235 back to local jurisdiction, and extended SR-235 800 feet (240 m) north along Washington Boulevard from 2550 North to 2700 North to meet with the new eastern terminus of SR-134.

== Major intersections ==
The entire route is in Weber County.

Location	mi	km	Destinations	Notes
Ogden	0.000	0.000	US 89 (Washington Boulevard)	Southern terminus
Ogden	0.262	0.422	SR-286 east (AVC Lane)	Access loop for Ogden–Weber Applied Technology College
Ogden	0.359	0.578	SR-286 west (Dan Street)	
North Ogden	3.071	4.942	2550 North	Old routing of SR-235
North Ogden	3.202	5.153	SR-134 (2600 North)	Northern terminus
1.000 mi = 1.609 km; 1.000 km = 0.621 mi
