= Brent Taylor =

Brent Taylor may refer to:

- Brent Taylor (activist), member of the Squamish Five
- Brent Taylor (Canadian politician) (born 1959), Canadian politician
- Brent Taylor (Tennessee politician) (born 1968), member of the Tennessee State Senate 2022 - Present
- Brent R. Taylor (1979–2018), American politician and Army National Guard officer
