= Patrick Scales (American football) =

American football player (born 1988)

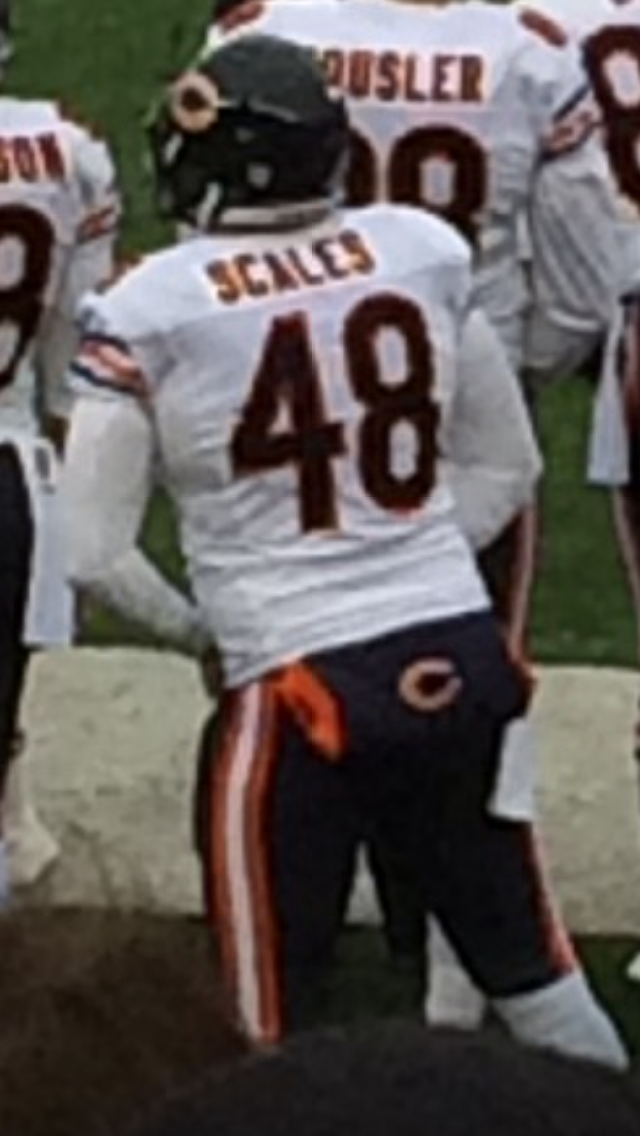
- Scales with the Chicago Bears in 2015

Profile
- Position: Long snapper

Personal information
- Born: February 11, 1988 (age 38); Louisville, Kentucky, U.S.
- Listed height: 6 ft 3 in (1.91 m)
- Listed weight: 226 lb (103 kg)

Career information
- High school: Weber (Pleasant View, Utah)
- College: Utah State (2006–2010)
- NFL draft: 2011: undrafted

Career history
- Baltimore Ravens (2011–2012)*; Miami Dolphins (2013)*; New York Jets (2013)*; Tampa Bay Buccaneers (2014)*; Baltimore Ravens (2014); Chicago Bears (2015–2024)
- * Offseason or practice squad member only

Career NFL statistics
- Games played: 122
- Total tackles: 14
- Stats at Pro Football Reference

Patrick Scales (born February 11, 1988) is an American professional football long snapper. He played college football for the Utah State Aggies. He has also been a member of the Baltimore Ravens, Miami Dolphins, New York Jets, Tampa Bay Buccaneers, and Chicago Bears.

== Early life ==
Scales played high school football for at Weber High School in Pleasant View, Utah. He was a second-team all-region selection for the Warriors. He saw time at tight end, defensive end and long snapper. Scales also played basketball and baseball. He earned academic all-state and all-region honors.

== College career ==
Scales played for the Utah State Aggies from 2007 to 2010. He was redshirted in 2006.

== Professional career ==
=== Pre-draft ===
Scales was rated as the 11th best long snapper in the 2011 NFL draft by NFLDraftScout.com.

Pre-draft measurables
Height	Weight	40-yard dash	10-yard split	20-yard split	20-yard shuttle	Three-cone drill	Vertical jump	Broad jump	Bench press
6 ft 3 7/8 in (1.93 m)	244 lb (111 kg)	5.08 s	1.77 s	3.00 s	4.57 s	7.61 s	29 in (0.74 m)	8 ft 10 in (2.69 m)	14 reps
All values from Utah State Pro Day

=== Baltimore Ravens (first stint) ===
Scales signed with the Baltimore Ravens on July 27, 2011, after going undrafted in the 2011 NFL Draft. He was released by the Ravens on September 3, 2011. He signed with the Ravens on May 1, 2012. Scales was released by the team on August 26, 2012.

=== Miami Dolphins ===
Scales was signed by the Miami Dolphins on April 8, 2013. He was released by the Dolphins on May 15, 2013.

=== New York Jets ===
Scales signed with the New York Jets on July 23, 2013. He was released by the Jets on August 26, 2013.

=== Tampa Bay Buccaneers ===
Scales signed a futures deal with the Tampa Bay Buccaneers on January 6, 2014. He was released by the Buccaneers on April 9, 2014.

=== Baltimore Ravens (second stint) ===
Scales was signed by the Ravens on December 18, 2014. He made his NFL debut on December 21, 2014, against the Houston Texans. He was released by the Ravens on August 31, 2015.

=== Chicago Bears ===
Scales signed with the Chicago Bears on November 28, 2015. On March 4, 2017, he signed a one-year extension with the Bears. On August 28, 2017, he was waived/injured by the Bears and placed on injured reserve after suffering a torn ACL in the team's third preseason game.

On March 27, 2018, Scales re-signed with the Bears. On April 2, 2019, Scales re-signed with the Bears on a one-year deal. Scales re-signed with the Bears on March 26, 2020. He re-signed with the team to another one-year contract on April 7, 2021.

On March 15, 2022, Scales signed a one-year, $1.27 million contract extension with Chicago. He signed a contract extension on March 10, 2023, making him the longest tenured Bears player.

Scales was placed on injured reserve with a back injury on August 29, 2024. Scott Daly was signed to be his replacement for the season.

The Bears opted to keep Daly in 2025, making Scales a free agent after ten years. Scales thanked the team in a statement where he called Chicago a "dream come true" and wrote, "Our kids know no life without you, Chicago Bears, and raising them with you was the biggest honor of our life."
