= Weber High School =

High school in Pleasant View, Utah

Location
- 430 West Weber High Drive; Pleasant View, Utah 84414; 41°19′24″N 111°59′05″W

Information
- Type: Public
- School district: Weber School District
- Principal: Ryan Kachold
- Faculty: 90
- Teaching staff: 99.18 (FTE)
- Grades: 10-12
- Enrollment: 2,074 (2023-2024)
- Average class size: 6A
- Student to teacher ratio: 20.91
- Colors: Red and black
- Mascot: Warrior
- Website: Weber High School

Weber High School /ˈwiːbər/ is a Utah secondary school located in Pleasant View, Utah, about five miles north of Ogden. It serves the residents of Pleasant View, North Ogden, Harrisville, Huntsville, Eden, and Liberty. It is part of the Weber School District and includes grades 10–12.

The location of the original Weber High School was between 11th and 12th Street on the east side of Washington Boulevard in Ogden (the site of a current VASA Fitness gym). In 1926, Weber County voters approved a bond for a county high school by a vote of 733 to 480. Construction of the building began in 1926 and was completed in 1927. Educators held school in the building in the fall of 1926, although the school was still under construction.

In 1953-54 the school expanded with the addition of a new south wing.

When the current campus opened in Pleasant View, the old building remained, until demolished in the mid-1980s. The current location of Weber High was established and opened in 1973 with an addition to the building in 1984. In the fall of 1994, the student population was split and half of the students went to the newly built Fremont High School.

Their primary rivals are the Silver Wolves of Fremont High School, due to the close proximity of the two schools and the splitting of Weber in 1994 to build Fremont.

== Notable alumni ==
- Olene Walker (1948), Utah's first female governor
- Jerry Moyes (1962), CEO of Swift Transportation
- Blair Buswell (1975), American artist
- Rulon Jones (1976), NFL player
- John D. Johnson (1977), professor and member of the Utah State Senate
- Kelsey Nixon (2003), television cooking personality
- Steven Siler (2005), professional mixed martial artist for the UFC, The Ultimate Fighter 14 competitor
- Patrick Scales (2006), NFL player
