= Utah State Route 194 (disambiguation) =

Utah State Route 194 may refer to:

- Utah State Route 194, a state highway in northern Utah County, Utah, that connects State Route 68/State Route 85 with Interstate 15/U.S. Route 89
- Utah State Route 194 (1947-1969), a former state highway in Richfield, Utah, that formed a western loop off of the former routing of U.S. Route 89
- Utah State Route 194 (1935-1947), a former state highway in southern Davis County, Utah, that formed an eastern loop off of the former State Route 1 (then U.S. Route 91, but now signed as U.S. Route 89)
