= Utah State Route 193 =

State highway in Utah, United States

State Route 193

Route information
- Maintained by UDOT
- Length: 11.043 mi (17.772 km)
- Existed: 1935–present

Major junctions
- West end: SR-177 in West Point
- SR-108 in Syracuse; SR-126 in Clearfield; I-15 in Clearfield; SR-232 in Layton
- East end: US 89 in Layton

Location
- Country: United States
- State: Utah

Highway system
- Utah State Highway System; Interstate; US; State; Minor; Scenic
← US 191	→ SR-194

State Route 193 is an east and west highway located completely in Davis County, Utah, United States that begins at the West Davis Corridor, runs past the south entrance of Hill Air Force Base and ends at US-89.

== Route description ==
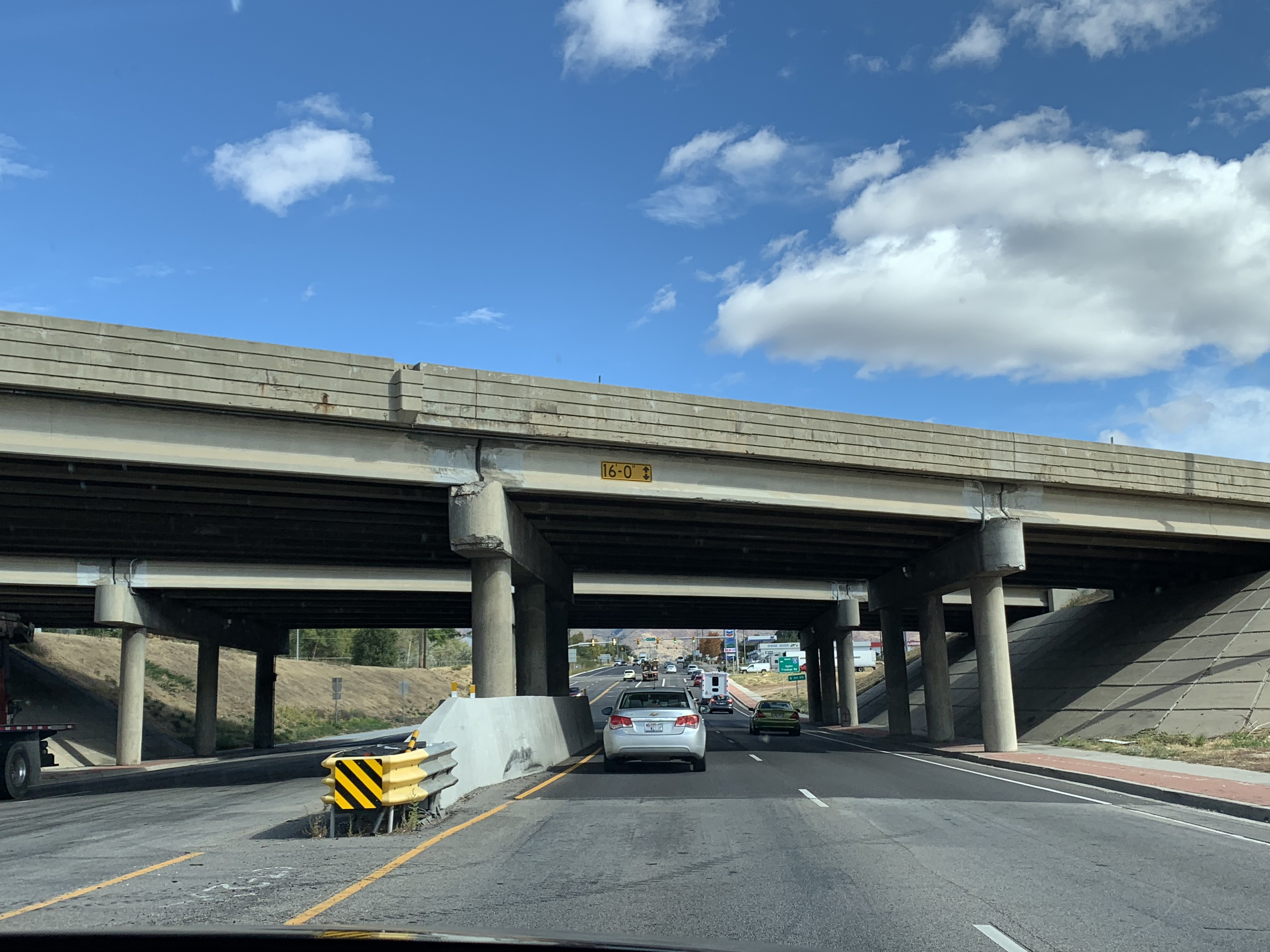
SR-193 passing under Interstate 15 in Clearfield, October 2018)

SR-193 begins at an intersection with the northern terminus of the West Davis Corridor and Bernard F. Fisher Highway in West Point. It heads northeast into Syracuse before turning east as a four-lane highway divided by a center turn lane. After crossing SR-108 (2000 West), the route turns southeast, passing north of the Freeport Center, then returns east, crossing over Union Pacific Railroad tracks. SR-193 enters Clearfield as a four-lane undivided highway, crossing SR-126 at Main Street. After intersecting with local roads and passing to the north of a park, the road has a diamond interchange with I-15 at Exit 334. East of the interchange, Hill Air Force Base borders the northern side of the road and the highway enters Layton. The route intersects with the northern terminus of SR-232 at Hill Field Road, which also provides access to the south gate of the air force base. Past the southeastern fringe of the base, the road turns to the southeast before intersecting with Church Street, where SR-193 turns northeast again. The highway approaches the eastern edge of Layton and terminates at a diamond interchange with US-89 at Exit 404.

== History ==
The state legislature created SR-193 in 1935, running northeast from SR-1 (now SR-126) in Layton to SR-49 (now US-89). Despite the original definition, the road was built with federal aid in 1940 and 1941 past Hill Air Force Base, with a western terminus at SR-1 in Clearfield; a separate route - SR-232 - was similarly built in 1940 and numbered in 1941, running north from Layton to SR-193 at Hill Field. The definition of SR-193 was corrected to reflect its new route in 1945.

In 2015, the route was extended west from SR-126 to 2000 West in Syracuse (SR-108). Another extension two years later brought the western terminus to 3000 West. Another extension, which opened on January 6, 2024, brought the western terminus to the West Davis Corridor in West Point.

== Major intersections ==
The entire route is in Davis County.

Location	mi	km	Destinations	Notes
West Point	0.000	0.000	4500 West	Intersection; western terminus
West Point	0.906	1.458	SR-177 (West Davis Corridor)	Intersection
Syracuse	2.594	4.175	SR-108 (2000 West)	
Clearfield	5.386	8.668	SR-126 (State Street)	
Clearfield	5.968	9.605	I-15 – Salt Lake City, Ogden	
Layton	7.575	12.191	SR-232 south (Hill Field Road)	
Layton	11.043	17.772	US 89 – Salt Lake City, Ogden	Interchange; eastern terminus
1.000 mi = 1.609 km; 1.000 km = 0.621 mi

== See also ==
- List of state highways in Utah
