= Utah State Route 232 =

Highway in Layton, Utah

State Route 232
- Hill Field Road
- SR-232 highlighted in red

Route information
- Maintained by UDOT
- Length: 2.401 mi (3.864 km)
- Existed: 1941–present

Major junctions
- South end: SR-126 in Layton
- I-15 in Layton; SR-193 in Layton
- North end: Hill Air Force Base South Gate Guard Station

Location
- Country: United States
- State: Utah
- Counties: Davis

Highway system
- Utah State Highway System; Interstate; US; State; Minor; Scenic
← SR-231	→ SR-235

State Route 232 is primarily a north and south highway located completely in Layton, Davis County, Utah that begins at SR-126 and runs to the south entrance of Hill Air Force Base.

== Route description ==
From its southern terminus in Layton, SR-232 heads north-east and intersects with I-15. The road then veers north. Near the northern terminus the road intersects with SR-193 and ends at the south entrance of Hill Air Force Base.

== History ==
The road from SR-1 (now SR-126) in Layton north to SR-193 at Hill Air Force Base was built in 1940 with federal aid and numbered SR-232 in 1941. A short realignment was made at the south end in 1967, when I-15 was built parallel to SR-126, and in 1994 the definition was changed to allow the route to extend north past SR-193 to the base entrance.

== Major intersections ==
The entire route is in Layton, Davis County.

mi	km	Destinations	Notes
0.000	0.000	SR-126	Southern terminus
0.121	0.195	I-15 – Salt Lake City, Ogden	
2.263	3.642	SR-193	
2.401	3.864	South Gate Hill Air Force Base	Northern terminus
1.000 mi = 1.609 km; 1.000 km = 0.621 mi
