= MaxPreps =

American sports website

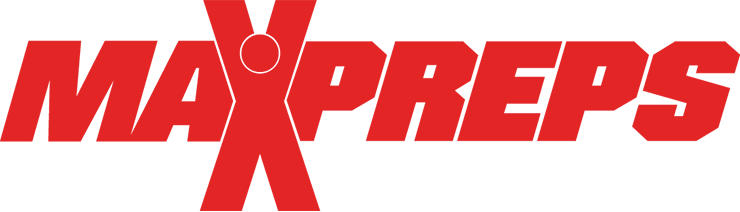
- Website type: Sports database
- Available in: English
- Headquarters: El Dorado Hills, California, U.S.
- Owner: PlayON! Sports Network
- Founder: Andy Beal
- Website: maxpreps.com
- Commercial: Yes
- Registration: Optional
- Launched: August 1, 2002; 24 years ago
- Current status: Online

MaxPreps is an American website that specializes in coverage of American high school sports. The site is currently owned by PlayOn. Founded on August 1, 2002, the company has covered up to 29 sports, including boys, girls, and co-ed sports.

== History ==
MaxPreps was founded in August 2002 by Andy Beal. In 2007, the company was acquired by CBS Interactive. In 2025, CBS sold MaxPreps to PlayOn.

== Sports covered ==
As of 2017, MaxPreps covered a total of 29 sports categorized into one of three categories: Boys, Girls, and Co-Ed. Five sports are exclusive to boys, five are exclusive to girls. Fifteen sports had separate male and female variants, and four were strictly co-ed. The following is a breakdown of the sports covered:

Sport	Boys	Girls	Co-Ed
Badminton	✓	✗	✗
Baseball	✓	✗	✗
Basketball	✓	✓	✗
Bowling	✓	✓	✗
Cheerleading	✗	✗	✓
Cross country	✓	✓	✗
Dance team	✗	✗	✓
Exhibition drill	✗	✗	✓
Field hockey	✗	✓	✗
Flag football	✗	✓	✗
Football	✓	✗	✗
Golf	✓	✓	✗
Gymnastics	✗	✓	✗
Ice hockey	✓	✓	✗
Indoor track and field	✓	✓	✗
Lacrosse	✓	✓	✗
Rugby football	✓	✗	✗
Ski and snowboard	✓	✓	✗
Soccer	✓	✓	✗
Slow-pitch softball	✗	✓	✗
Softball	✗	✓	✗
Speech & debate	✗	✗	✓
Swimming	✓	✓	✗
Tennis	✓	✓	✗
Track and field	✓	✓	✗
Volleyball	✓	✓	✗
Water polo	✓	✓	✗
Weightlifting	✓	✓	✗
Wrestling	✓	✗	✗

== MaxPreps Cup ==
Every year, MaxPreps awards an American high school the MaxPreps Cup, signifying that they are the #1 Athletic Program in the Nation. They have been awarding it since 2011. Before 2011, the award was just called #1 Athletic Program in the Nation.

Year	School	State
2011-12	American Heritage School	Florida
2012-13	Westminster School	Georgia
2013-14	Bentonville High School	Arkansas
2014-15	Bentonville High School (2)	Arkansas
2015-16	Jesuit High School	Oregon
2016-17	St. Thomas Aquinas High School	Florida
2017-18	American Heritage School (2)	Florida
2018-19	Jesuit High School (2)	Oregon
2019-20	Carmel High School	Indiana
2020-21	Marist School	Georgia
