= Daniel C. Davis =

American Mormon pioneer

Daniel Coon Davis (February 23, 1804 – June 1, 1850) was the captain of Company E in the Mormon Battalion. He became an early leader of Davis County, Utah, which is named after him.

Davis was born in Petersburg, New York.

Davis was baptized a member of the Church of Jesus Christ of Latter Day Saints at Council Bluffs, Iowa. In 1839, he was appointed master of the ferry that traveled between Nauvoo, Illinois and Montrose, Iowa.

Captain Davis led a company in the Mormon Battalion during the Mexican War. His wife Susan and son Daniel Jr. accompanied Company E at the beginning of their trek west. Daniel Jr. was the son of Davis first wife, Sophronia Fuller, who had died. Daniel Jr. at six was the youngest person to go all the way with the Mormon Battalion. Later, Davis led many Mormon pioneer groups across the plains to settle the West. In 1849 Davis settled on Davis Creek in what is now Farmington, Utah. In early 1850, on one such trip, Captain Davis became ill and died near Fort Kearney, Nebraska, on his way back to the outfitting stations on the Missouri River.
