= West Weber, Utah =

Unincorporated community in the state of Utah, United States

- Township
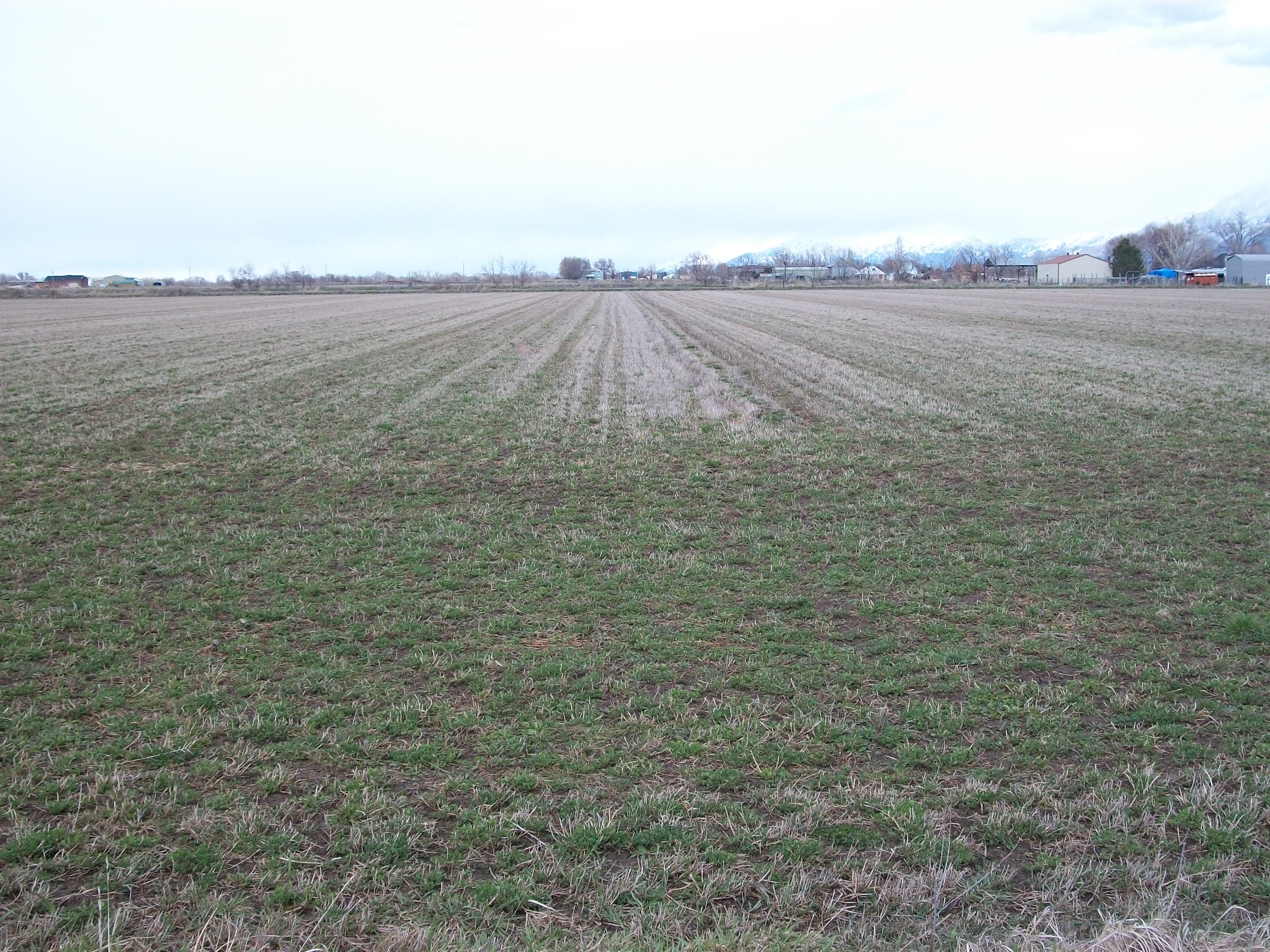
- An agricultural field in West Weber, March 2011

- Location within Utah Location within the United States
- Coordinates: 41°14′56″N 112°04′42″W
- Country: United States
- State: Utah
- County: Weber
- Established: 1861
- Named for: Weber River
- Elevation: 4,239 ft (1,292 m)
- GNIS feature ID: 1447187

West Weber (/ˈwiːbər/ WEE-bər) is a township and unincorporated community in western Weber County, Utah, United States.

== Description ==
The community is located west and northwest of Ogden. West Weber was reportedly organized as a ward in 1877, when it had a population of 700 inhabitants. The community took its name from the Weber River; the name was prefixed with "West" to avoid repetition with other Webers in the territory. The community is located northeast of the intersection of Utah state routes 39 and 134. The nearest major highway is the Interstate 84/Interstate 15 (Veterans Memorial Highway), which Route 39 leads to, about 3.3-mile (5.3 km) to the east.

Historical population
Census	Pop.	Note	%±
1880	603		—
1890	722		19.7%
1900	822		13.9%
1910	823		0.1%
1920	379		−53.9%
1930	409		7.9%
1940	396		−3.2%
1950	417		5.3%
Source: U.S. Census Bureau

West Weber contains the West Weber Elementary School. The Weber River flows nearby and a bridge was built in 1903 over the river.

A minor accident occurred near West Weber on 17 September 1931 on the 8300 Ms. (20S) Southern Pacific, caused by an emergency airbrake application. Conductor C.A. Peterson was thrown against the cupola stand, injuring his shoulder, and brakeman P.L. Burnette was thrown to the floor.

== Economy ==
The eastern area of West Weber was known for some time as Wilson. John Staker and Ebenezer Wiggins reportedly raised a crop of grain in the area in 1853. The land at West Weber was reported in 1903 to have a reputation as one of the poorest soils between Salt Lake City and Ogden. However, beets are grown in the area, made possible by boring artesian wells for irrigation, aided by the presence of nitrates, as thereby valuable plant food is added to the soil. Archibald McFarland had originally dug a canal in West Weber in 1859 from one of the sloughs bordering the Weber River for irrigation purposes. The earlier settlers spent about $2500 to irrigate ten small farms in the area in 1860–61. In 1903, studies showed that beets having a purity average of 81.3 were raised on soil containing 1880 pounds of alkali within the surface acre-foot, and when the content of alkali was lowered to 376 pounds, the beet purity went up to 84.9.
