= West Davis Corridor =

Freeway in Davis County, Utah, United States

West Davis Corridor
- The West Davis Corridor highlighted in red

Route information
- Maintained by UDOT
- Length: 16 mi (26 km)
- Existed: January 6, 2024–present

Major junctions
- South end: I-15 / US 89 / SR-67 in Farmington
- SR-127 in Syracuse
- North end: SR-193 in West Point

Location
- Country: United States
- State: Utah

Highway system
- Utah State Highway System; Interstate; US; State; Minor; Scenic
← SR-176	→ SR-178

The West Davis Corridor (designated as Utah State Route 177 or SR-177) is a 16-mile-long (26 km) freeway completely within Davis County in northern Utah. The corridor splits off from Interstate 15 (I-15) and U.S. Route 89 (US-89) along with the Legacy Parkway (SR-67) in Farmington and goes through the western confines of the Ogden–Clearfield metropolitan area before ending at an T-intersection with SR-193 in West Point.

Planning for the corridor drew environmental controversy prior to its construction, leading to adjustments in response to environmental groups such as adding multi-purpose trails paralleling the highway. Construction began on the West Davis Corridor in early 2021 and was open to traffic on January 6, 2024, although construction would not be completed until February 21, 2024.

== Route description ==
The highway begins at an interchange with I-15/US-89 and Legacy Parkway just south of Glovers Lane in Farmington, proceeding to the northwest as a four-lane freeway. It swings to the north, following the shoreline of the Great Salt Lake, before turning northwest at an interchange with a proposed connection to Shepard Lane. The freeway continues northwest through the cities of Kaysville and Layton, with interchanges at 200 North and 2700 West. Entering Syracuse, the route shifts onto the alignment of Bluff Road, with interchanges at 2000 West and Antelope Drive (SR-127). Past Antelope Drive, the highway narrows to two lanes. As the route continues into West Point, it turns northward, ending at the extension of SR-193.

== History ==
=== Initial proposals ===
The idea for a new corridor connecting Ogden and Salt Lake City existed as early as the 1960s. However, it was not officially studied until 1995, when state representative Marda Dillree pushed the Utah State Legislature to allocate $600,000 for a corridor planning study. The idea was included in Governor Mike Leavitt's ambitious Legacy Highway proposal in 1996; Leavitt envisioned a new highway running from Brigham City to Nephi through the western portions of the Wasatch Front, though no route had been selected at that time. Other portions of this proposal would become today's Legacy Parkway and Mountain View Corridor.

Almost from the beginning, the planned routing of what was then known as the Western Transportation Corridor was filled with disputes. In particular, a dispute over the routing north of Gentile Street in Layton came to a head in April 1997, when the committee tasked with selecting a route could not come to an agreement. Officials from West Point had identified a corridor along Bluff Road and had been preserving land along it since 1986. However, Syracuse preferred a western alignment that would not split the city, citing hazards to schools and other city facilities. Two western routes were being studied: one that ran roughly between 4200 and 4500 West, and another just east of the Great Salt Lake marshes. The 4500 West corridor ran through 1,000 acres of productive farmland and was deeply opposed by farmers and the state agricultural department, while the Great Salt Lake corridor would negatively impact wetlands protected under federal law. While Davis County cities and residents mostly supported the proposal, reception in Weber County was much more mixed. Some officials from that county opposed reserving land for a highway that might not ever be built, while others worried about the agricultural lifestyle of northwestern portions of the county. They also stated that the new corridor was not near the top of their priority list, instead favoring improvements on I-15 and existing arterials. Farr West opposed any route coming close to the Weber County line, while Hooper residents would support a highway provided it would only carry local traffic.

However, most of these disputes had been resolved by July of that year, when the committee was finally able to select a route through northern Davis and southern Weber counties. Under the agreement, it would follow Bluff Road from Gentile north to 300 North in West Point, where it would go north into Weber County to the intersection of 4900 West and 5500 South. From this point it would continue to 4000 South along an alignment just west of 4700 West, before moving east to 3500 West and continuing north to end at 1200 South. This corridor was identified as the preferred alternative in a 2001 study. A route through the rest of Weber County would not be identified until a 2009 supplemental study.

Possible connections between the proposed corridor (then referred to as Legacy North) and Legacy Parkway were identified in a 2007 UDOT study, which identified a preferred alignment beginning at a combined interchange with I-15/Legacy Parkway and roughly following the old Denver & Rio Grande Western Railroad alignment northward. However, Farmington was unhappy with this result and commissioned its own study, which recommended waiting to adopt an alignment until a full environmental analysis could be conducted.

=== Environmental studies ===
In 2010, UDOT began an $8 million federal environmental impact study on the North Legacy Corridor, though by this time UDOT had changed the name of the project to "West Davis Corridor". To avoid legal battles similar to the Legacy Parkway controversies, UDOT reached out to environmental groups early on in the process. Environmental groups generally opposed the highway, citing concerns over wetlands and air quality. By August 2010, the UDOT study had identified four possible routings through northwestern Davis County: the 2001 alignment along Bluff Road, another alignment east of Bluff Road following existing electrical transmission lines, another alignment further east following the FrontRunner commuter rail line, and a fourth alignment along the eastern edge of the Great Salt Lake. The study had narrowed down to three potential options by September 2011, including two alternatives that would have negative impacts on wetlands and agriculture, plus a "no-build" alternative. The study was further refined in 2012, decreasing the area of wetlands, agriculture, and number of homes affected.

The draft environmental impact study was released in May 2013, outlining one proposed route that would begin at I-15 and Legacy Parkway in Centerville, proceeding generally northwest and north to 4100 West in Weber County. The cost was estimated at $587 million; the route would impact 26 homes, 110 acres of high-quality farmland, and 52 acres of high-quality wetlands.

The proposed routing was not without controversy. Although Farmington city officials supported the highway, they continued their opposition of the Glovers Lane routing, believing such an alignment would effectively bypass the city. Farmington officials suggested a connection to Interstate 15 at Shepard Lane instead, stating it would benefit the city and relieve congestion on Park Lane.

=== Shared solution ===
However, the strongest opposition to the proposed freeway came from environmental groups. A coalition of several groups including the Sierra Club, Great Salt Lake Audubon, and Utah Physicians for a Healthy Environment proposed a "shared solution" and distributed it to several top officials. Instead of building a new freeway, the Shared Solution proposed to enhance existing roads and increase transit, emphasizing "boulevard community development", new innovative intersection designs, and locally focused road designs. It also proposed widening existing east–west arterial roads and building a reversible lane on I-15. According to its proponents, the Shared Solution improvements combined would move the same amount of traffic as a freeway. UDOT agreed to study the Shared Solution, but rejected it in 2016 after determining it would not alleviate congestion enough to meet transportation needs in 2040. However, UDOT acknowledged the efforts of the Shared Solution coalition, and included many ideas from the Shared Solution in plans for the West Davis Corridor as well as other area projects.

=== Final planning ===
The final environmental impact statement was released on July 6, 2017, followed by a two-month public comment period. The 2017 route was largely identical to the one proposed in 2013, extending from Glovers Lane northwest to 1800 North (SR-37) in West Point. Although Farmington had pushed for the highway to end at Shepard Lane, UDOT studies determined an interchange in that location would not meet federal safety guidelines due to its proximity to the US-89/Legacy interchange.

Unlike the similar Legacy Parkway to the south, the freeway would have a 65 mph speed limit and allow large trucks, but UDOT officials expect low truck traffic on the corridor. However, several concessions were made to environmental groups; in particular, UDOT agreed to use dark-sky lighting designs, ground-level construction, and noise-reducing pavement. In addition, 20 miles of new multi-use trails will be built paralleling the highway. Although not all parties were happy with the results of the study, most were satisfied with the changes UDOT had made between the 2013 and 2017 environmental studies.

The Federal Highway Administration and UDOT issued a final record of decision in September 2017, with property acquisition and design continuing through 2018 and 2019. Construction of the segment between I-15 and Antelope Drive was expected to begin in 2020 and last through 2022, at a cost of $610 million.

=== Construction ===
The first phase of the West Davis highway consists of a 16 miles (26 km) stretch of freeway with two lanes in each direction, extending from a system interchange at I-15 and Legacy Parkway in Farmington northwest through Kaysville, Layton, and Syracuse to a planned western extension of SR-193 in West Point. This initial phase also includes interchanges at 950 North in Farmington, 200 North in Kaysville, 2700 West in Layton, and 2000 West and Antelope Drive (SR-127) in Syracuse, as well as over 10 miles (16 km) of multi-use trails paralleling the highway. Farmington Bay Constructors, a joint venture of Ames Construction, Wadsworth Brothers Construction, and Staker Parson Materials and Construction, was contracted to design and build this first phase for $750 million.

Construction began in March 2021, with activity ramping up from south to north along the route in subsequent months. Work was contracted to be complete by fall 2024, but officials believed the project could be finished at a sooner date. The project was 60 percent complete by January 2023, with a completion date estimated at mid-2024. By March 2023, completion had reached 70 percent, but the expected opening was pushed back to fall 2024, in part due to construction delays caused by the unusually snowy winter that year. Despite these delays, significant progress was made over the following spring and summer, and by September, UDOT hoped to have the highway open by the end of the year. However, construction was abruptly halted after a construction worker was killed in a crane collapse at the highway's interchange with I-15 on October 23, 2023. The highway would officially open on January 6, 2024, although construction would not be completed until February 21, 2024.

== Future ==
UDOT long-range plans call for the West Davis highway to be extended further northward, running through the Weber County communities of Hooper and West Haven before ultimately connecting back to I-15 in southern Box Elder County. Planning studies have identified a corridor for preservation through western Weber County, in which the first extension would bring dedicated interchanges to 700 S and 1800 N (Utah State Route 37) where the current upgrade would end. The extension is expected to start summer of 2026 and be completed from late 2028 to early 2029.

== Exit list ==
The entire route is in Davis County.

Location	mi	km	Exit	Destinations	Notes
Farmington	0.000	0.000	1A–B	I-15 / US 89 / SR-67 (Legacy Parkway) – Salt Lake City	Southern terminus; signed as exits 1A (I-15) and 1B (SR-67)
Farmington	3.991	6.423	4	950 North	
Kaysville	7.762	12.492	7	200 North	
Layton	9.742	15.678	9	2700 West	
Syracuse	12.420	19.988	12	2000 West	
Syracuse	14.100	22.692	13	SR-127 (Antelope Drive)	Single-point urban interchange; road narrows to 2 lanes north of this point
West Point	15.569	25.056	15	SR-193	Northern terminus; T-intersection; future diamond interchange
West Point	18.069	29.079	18	SR-37 (1800 North)	Future northern terminus; T-intersection, future interchange
1.000 mi = 1.609 km; 1.000 km = 0.621 mi
