= Utah State Route 194 =

State highway in Utah, United States

State Route 194
- 2100 North
- SR 194 highlighted in red

Route information
- Maintained by UDOT
- Length: 2.977 mi (4.791 km)
- Existed: 2019–present

Major junctions
- East end: I-15 / US 89 in Lehi (Note: The mileposts on this route increase to the west, as it was originally the southernmost segment of SR-85 and the highway was never re-mileposted after being renumbered.)
- West end: SR-85 east of Saratoga Springs

Location
- Country: United States
- State: Utah
- Counties: Utah

Highway system
- Utah State Highway System; Interstate; US; State; Minor; Scenic
← SR-193	→ SR-196

State Route 194 (SR-194) is a state highway in northern Utah County, Utah, in the United States that runs along 2100 North in Lehi and connects SR-85 (Mountain View Corridor) with Interstate 15 and U.S. Route 89. The route is a part of the greater Mountain View Corridor project.

== Route description ==
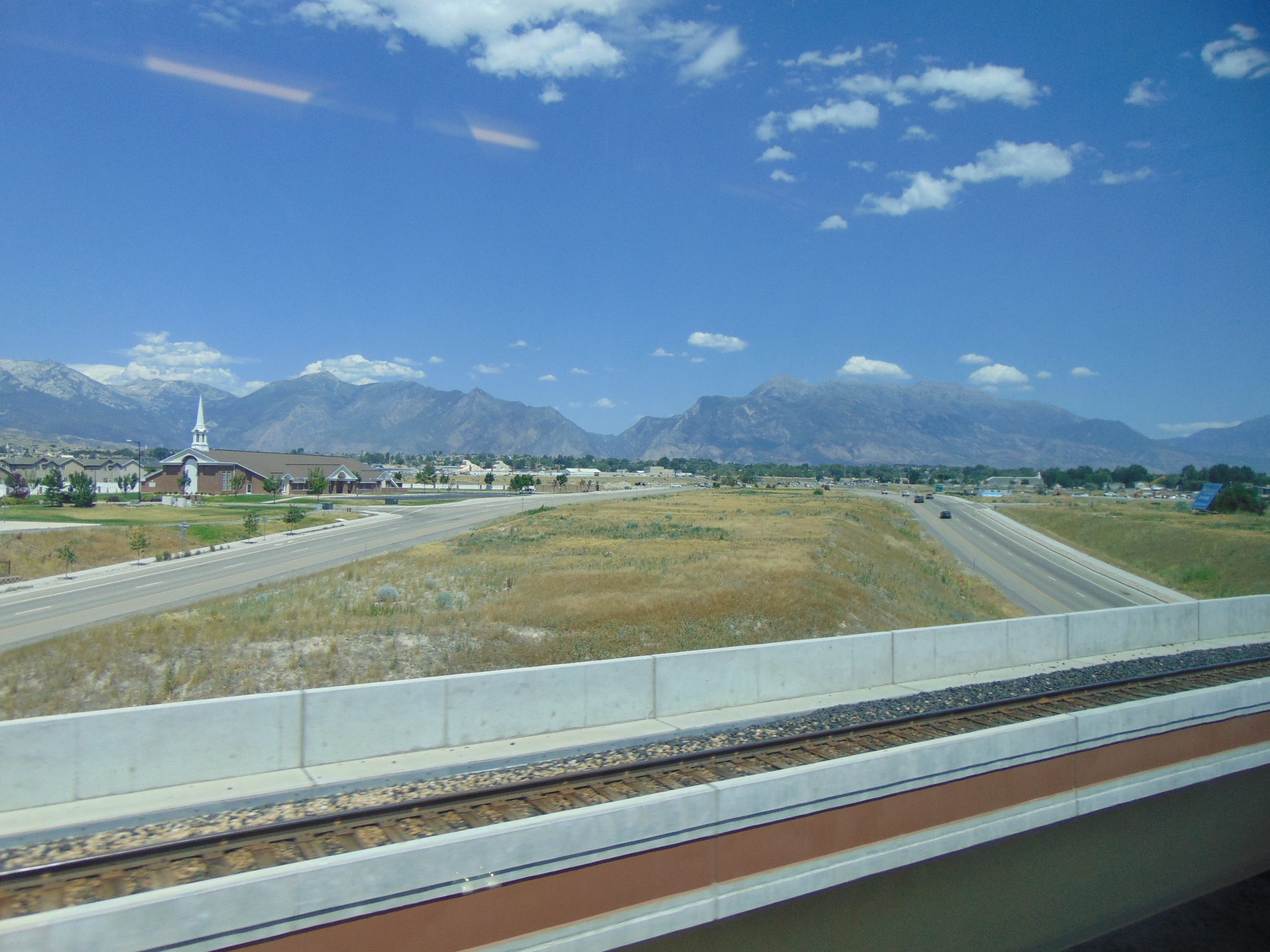
Looking east along SR-194 (then SR-85) from the FrontRunner tracks in Lehi, July 2016

SR-194 begins in Lehi at the northbound ramps of I-15 exit 282. From its eastern terminus, the route briefly runs concurrently with northbound US-89 as they swing to the west onto the alignment of 2100 North. The routes promptly arrive at an intersection with State Street and the southbound I-15 on and off-ramps, where US-89 splits to the south on State Street.

Continuing west, SR-194 splits into a divided highway with split intersections at Thanksgiving Way, Triumph Boulevard, 3600 West, and Redwood Road, as well as Texas U-turns immediately west of Triumph Boulevard and on both sides of 3600 West. Just before crossing over the Jordan River the route leaves Lehi and enters unincorporated Utah County. After crossing 3600 West, SR-194 has an interchange at SR-68 (Redwood Road). Further west, SR-194 ends at an interchange with SR-85 (Mountain View Highway).

== History ==
As part of the Mountain View Corridor project, construction began in 2010 on the western end of 2100 North in Lehi. The new section of roadway ran between I-15/US-89 and Redwood Road, and was completed in September 2011. It was the first road segment of the Mountain View Corridor project to be built and was designated as SR-85.

Later, the primary north–south segment of the corridor was built in Salt Lake County, initially opening in 2012. However, this was also designated SR-85, resulting in two discontinuous segments of SR-85 with an implied concurrency connecting the two pieces. This situation lasted until 2017, when construction was started on the section of the Mountain View Corridor connecting SR-73 with SR-68 at 2100 North. This required a route renumbering, as the segment under construction was also planned to be numbered SR-85. As a result, the Utah State Legislature re-designated the original east–west segment of SR-85 on 2100 North as SR-194.

In 2018 construction began on the I-15 Technology Corridor Project. As part of that project, the interchange between SR-194, I-15, and US-89 was entirely rebuilt and moved slightly to the northwest. During construction, it was temporarily converted to a modified diverging diamond interchange. In addition, the I-15 southbound on-ramp was temporarily moved from its former location southwest of the interchange to a cloverleaf-style ramp on the northwest side of the interchange, and returned to its original location when the project was complete.

== Future ==
Like the rest of the Mountain View Corridor, plans call for SR-194 to be upgraded to a freeway in the future. The freeway lanes will be built in the median of the existing divided highway, and the existing roadways will become one-way frontage roads with slip ramps. The upgrade will provide freeway access between the future SR-85 freeway and I-15. As these additional upgrades are unfunded, no projected completion date has been given.

== Major intersections ==
The entire route is in Utah County.

Location	mi	km	Destinations	Notes
Lehi	0.000– 0.332	0.000– 0.534	I-15 (Veterans Memorial Highway) / US 89 north – Salt Lake City, Provo	Eastern terminus (I-15 exit number 282); road continues north as 1200 West; eastern end of US-89 concurrency
Lehi	0.332	0.534	US 89 south (State Street)	Western end of US-89 concurrency
Lehi	0.553	0.890	Thanksgiving Way (1450 West)	Split intersection
Lehi	0.861– 0.872	1.386– 1.403	Union Pacific Railroad and FrontRunner overpass	
Lehi	1.073	1.727	Triumph Boulevard (2300 West)	Split intersection
	1.336– 1.575	2.150– 2.535	Bridge over the Jordan River	
	2.125	3.420	3600 West	Split intersection
	2.977	4.791	SR-68 (Redwood Road)	Interchange
	3	4.8	SR-85 (Mountain View Corridor)	Interchange; western terminus
1.000 mi = 1.609 km; 1.000 km = 0.621 mi: Concurrency terminus; Incomplete access
