= Syracuse, Utah =

City in Utah, United States

- City
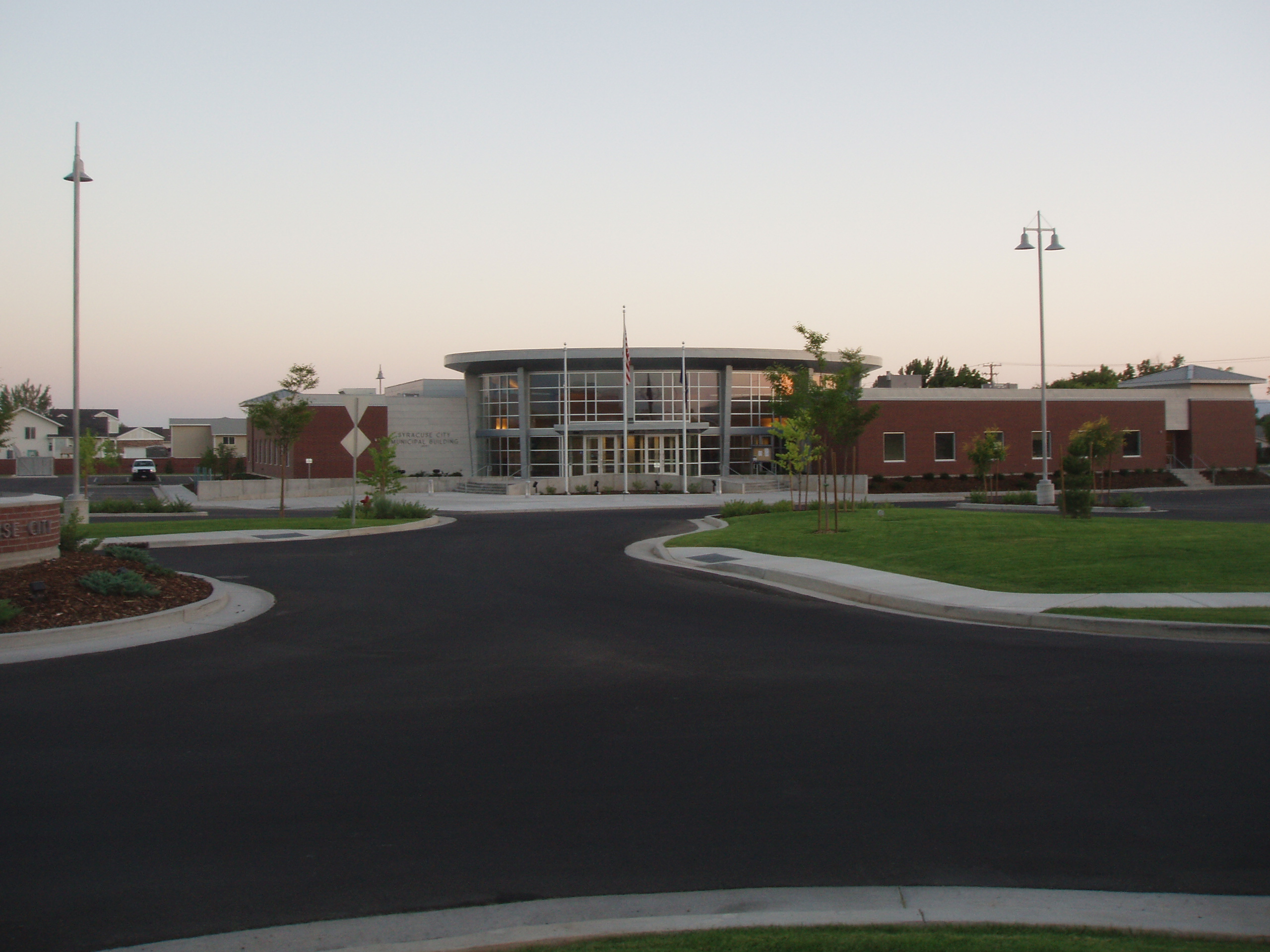
- Syracuse City Municipal Center

- Location in Davis County and the state of Utah
- Coordinates: 41°05′09″N 112°04′11″W
- Country: United States
- State: Utah
- County: Davis
- Settled: 1878
- Incorporated: September 3, 1935
- City: September 13, 1950
- Named for: Syracuse, New York

Government
  - Type: Mayor-council government
  - Mayor: Dave Maughan

Area
  - Total: 10.18 sq mi (26.37 km^{2})
  - Land: 10.17 sq mi (26.35 km^{2})
  - Water: 0.0077 sq mi (0.02 km^{2})
- Elevation: 4,272 ft (1,302 m)

Population (2020)
  - Total: 32,141
  - Density: 3,091.5/sq mi (1,193.63/km^{2})
- Time zone: UTC-7 (Mountain (MST))
  - Summer (DST): UTC-6 (MDT)
- ZIP code: 84075
- Area codes: 385, 801
- FIPS code: 49-74810
- GNIS feature ID: 2412024
- Website: www.syracuseut.gov

Syracuse is a city in Davis County, Utah, United States. It is situated between the Great Salt Lake and Interstate 15, about 30 miles (48 km) north of Salt Lake City. The West Davis Corridor (Utah State Route 177) runs northwest through Syracuse, with interchanges at 2000 West and Antelope Drive (SR-127). It is part of the Ogden–Clearfield Metropolitan Statistical Area.

The city has seen rapid growth and development since the 1990s. The city population was 24,331 at the time of the 2010 census, an increase of 158.9% since the 2000 census. By the 2020 census, the population further increased to 32,141.

Although white settlers have inhabited the area since the mid-1800s, the Syracuse Town Board was formed in 1935. An application for township status was officially submitted on September 3, 1935, and was recorded by the Utah state authorities on October 14, 1935. On August 21, 1950, the Syracuse Town Board passed a resolution to establish Syracuse as a third-class city, which was subsequently approved by a proclamation signed by Governor J. Bracken Lee on September 13, 1950. The city was named by early settlers for Syracuse, New York, which was famed for its salt production in the 19th century.

== Geography ==
The city is located in northern Davis County on the eastern side of the Great Salt Lake. It is bordered to the north by West Point, to the northeast and east by Clearfield, and to the southeast by Layton. Syracuse City is known as the "Gateway to Antelope Island" and connects to Antelope Island State Park in the Great Salt Lake by a causeway from SR 127.

According to the United States Census Bureau, Syracuse has a total area of 9.6 square miles (24.8 km^{2}), of which 0.01 square miles (0.015 km^{2}), or 0.06%, are water.

=== Climate ===
According to the Köppen climate classification, Syracuse experiences either a Mediterranean climate (Csa) or a dry-summer continental climate (Dsa) depending on which variant of the system is used. Summers are hot and relatively dry, with highs frequently reaching 95 °F (35 °C), with a few days per year reaching 100 °F (38 °C). Rain is provided in the form of infrequent thunderstorms during summer, usually between late July and mid-September during the height of monsoon season. The Pacific storm season usually lasts from about October through May, with precipitation reaching its peak in spring. Snow usually first occurs in late October or early November, with the last occurring sometime in April. Winters are cool and snowy, with highs averaging 36 °F (2 °C) in January. Snowfall averages about 39 inches (99 cm), with approximately 27.41 inches (696 mm) of precipitation annually. Extremes range from −16 °F (−27 °C), set on January 26, 1949, to 106 °F (41 °C), set on July 14, 2002.

Climate data for Syracuse, Utah (1981–2010 normals)
Month	Jan	Feb	Mar	Apr	May	Jun	Jul	Aug	Sep	Oct	Nov	Dec	Year
Record high °F (°C)	65 (18)	68 (20)	78 (26)	87 (31)	98 (37)	102 (39)	106 (41)	102 (39)	97 (36)	93 (34)	75 (24)	66 (19)	106 (41)
Mean daily maximum °F (°C)	35.5 (1.9)	42.5 (5.8)	52.8 (11.6)	61.3 (16.3)	71.1 (21.7)	82.3 (27.9)	89.6 (32.0)	88.5 (31.4)	78.3 (25.7)	66.8 (19.3)	49.7 (9.8)	37.5 (3.1)	63.0 (17.2)
Mean daily minimum °F (°C)	24.8 (−4.0)	29.3 (−1.5)	36.3 (2.4)	43.1 (6.2)	51.3 (10.7)	60.1 (15.6)	66.7 (19.3)	66.1 (18.9)	57.7 (14.3)	45.5 (7.5)	35.3 (1.8)	26.5 (−3.1)	45.2 (7.3)
Record low °F (°C)	−16 (−27)	−11 (−24)	3 (−16)	17 (−8)	21 (−6)	33 (1)	37 (3)	34 (1)	29 (−2)	11 (−12)	−12 (−24)	−12 (−24)	−16 (−27)
Average precipitation inches (mm)	3.05 (77)	2.50 (64)	2.60 (66)	2.50 (64)	2.40 (61)	1.40 (36)	0.70 (18)	0.80 (20)	1.60 (41)	1.80 (46)	2.40 (61)	2.75 (70)	24.24 (616)
Average snowfall inches (cm)	12.3 (31)	7.5 (19)	3.4 (8.6)	1.4 (3.6)	0.1 (0.25)	0 (0)	0 (0)	0 (0)	0 (0)	0.5 (1.3)	5.3 (13)	9.4 (24)	39.3 (100)
Average precipitation days (≥ 0.01-inch)	8.3	13.8	14.3	14.0	14.5	8.1	6.9	7.0	8.0	8.4	9.7	11.8	124.8
Average snowy days (≥ 0.1-inch)	5.2	3.3	1.9	0.9	0	0	0	0	0	0.3	2.1	4.4	18.1
Source: WeatherWX

== Demographics ==
Historical population
Census	Pop.	Note	%±
1890	299		—
1900	299		0.0%
1910	553		84.9%
1920	629		13.7%
1930	890		41.5%
1940	732		−17.8%
1950	837		14.3%
1960	1,061		26.8%
1970	1,843		73.7%
1980	3,702		100.9%
1990	4,658		25.8%
2000	9,398		101.8%
2010	24,331		158.9%
2020	32,141		32.1%
U.S. Decennial Census

=== 2020 census ===
As of the 2020 census, Syracuse had a population of 32,141. The median age was 29.4 years.

About 36.4% of residents were under the age of 18 and 8.0% of residents were 65 years of age or older. For every 100 females there were 100.7 males, and for every 100 females age 18 and over there were 99.5 males age 18 and over.

99.2% of residents lived in urban areas, while 0.8% lived in rural areas.

There were 8,557 households in Syracuse, of which 57.1% had children under the age of 18 living in them. Of all households, 79.1% were married-couple households, 7.3% were households with a male householder and no spouse or partner present, and 10.9% were households with a female householder and no spouse or partner present. About 8.3% of all households were made up of individuals and 3.5% had someone living alone who was 65 years of age or older.

There were 8,767 housing units, of which 2.4% were vacant. The homeowner vacancy rate was 1.0% and the rental vacancy rate was 2.9%.

Racial composition as of the 2020 census
Race	Number	Percent
White	27,746	86.3%
Black or African American	352	1.1%
American Indian and Alaska Native	122	0.4%
Asian	649	2.0%
Native Hawaiian and Other Pacific Islander	158	0.5%
Some other race	890	2.8%
Two or more races	2,224	6.9%
Hispanic or Latino (of any race)	2,777	8.6%

=== 2010 census ===
As of the 2010 census, there were 24,331 people and 6,362 households residing in the city. The population density was 2,793.46 people per square mile (1,078.56 people/km^{2}). There were 6,534 housing units at an average density of 298.6 units per square mile (115.3 units/km^{2}).

The racial makeup of the city was 94.6% White, 2.9% Asian, 1.2% African American, 0.7% Native American, 0.6% Pacific Islander, 2.7% from other races. Hispanic or Latino of any race were 6% of the population.

There were 6,362 households, of which 42.0% had children under the age of 18 living with them. The average household size was 3.81 and the average family size was 4.02. The median age was 26.5 years, and for every 100 females there were 102.56 males.

=== 2000 census ===
At the 2000 census, 83.3% of households were married couples living together, 5.4% had a female householder with no husband present, and 9.1% were non-families. 7.1% of all households were made up of individuals, and 2.2% had someone living alone who was 65 years of age or older.

For every 100 females age 18 and over, there were 101.4 males.

The median income for a household in the city was $58,223, and the median income for a family was $60,000. Males had a median income of $41,346 versus $24,792 for females. The per capita income for the city was $16,989. About 2.1% of families and 2.4% of the population were below the poverty line, including 2.9% of those under age 18 and 6.5% of those age 65 or over.

== Schools ==
- Elementary Schools:
  - Bluff Ridge Elementary (est. 1999)
  - Buffalo Point Elementary (est. 2008)
  - Cook Elementary (est. 1979)
  - Island View Elementary (est. 2024) (serves Syracuse residents, located in West Point, Utah)
  - Syracuse Arts Academy Charter School - Antelope Campus (est. 2006)
  - Syracuse Arts Academy Charter School - North Campus (est. 2015)
  - Syracuse Arts Academy Charter School - South Campus (est. 2025)
  - Syracuse Elementary (est. 1968)
- Junior High Schools
  - Horizon Jr. High School (est. 2025) (serves Syracuse residents, located in West Point, Utah)
  - Syracuse Arts Academy Charter School Junior High (est. 2006)
  - Syracuse Junior High School (est. 1960)
- High Schools:
  - Syracuse High School (est. 2007)

== Notable people ==
- Amber Marshall (born 1999) – soccer player
- Hunter Woodhall (born 1999) – track and field athlete
