= Wolf Mountain =

Ski resort in Utah, US

- Interactive map of Wolf Mountain
- Location: Nordic Valley, Utah, US
- Nearest city: Ogden, Utah
- Coordinates: 41°19′42″N 111°49′27″W
- Vertical: 1,000 ft (300 m)
- Top elevation: 6,500 ft (2,000 m)
- Base elevation: 5,500 ft (1,700 m)
- Skiable area: 100 acres (0.40 km^{2})
- Trails: 40 total 20% easiest 30% more difficult 50% most difficult
- Longest run: 1,600 ft (490 m)
- Lift system: 5 lifts: 1 high speed six pack, 1 triple chair, 2 double chairs, 1 surface lift
- Lift capacity: 2,800/hr
- Terrain parks: yes
- Snowfall: 350 in (8.9 m)
- Snowmaking: 60%
- Night skiing: yes
- Website: Nordic Valley's Homepage

Wolf Mountain (formally titled Wolf Creek Utah Ski Resort), formerly Nordic Valley is a small local ski area in Nordic Valley, Utah, United States. The area was known as Nordic Valley until June 29, 2005, when it was acquired by the nearby Wolf Creek Golf Resort.

The resort is known for its inexpensive tickets and as a good place to take children for their first introduction to skiing or snowboarding. Nordic Valley has been described as having "the least expensive skiing and riding in Utah".

== The Mountain ==
Nordic Valley consists of a large beginner slope on the skiers left and several steeper and longer runs on the skiers right, with a terrain park cutting between the two. The short double chairlift Bridger and the newly installed longer Crockett access the beginner slope and the Terrain Park. Apollo, a longer double chairlift with a midway unloading station, provides the only access to most of the resort's terrain as it runs up the center of the hill; it also accesses the beginner slope and terrain park. The new Nordic Express, a high speed six pack, is accessed from Apollo and provides the most difficult terrain at the resort. A short surface lift, the Magic Carpet, is also available for beginners.

The creation of the Crockett Triple Chair expanded the beginner slope several hundred feet up the hill, and allowed the doubling in size of the Terrain Park. The triple chair also allows easier access to the forested area to the north of the terrain park.

Snowmaking covers most runs. The resort's snowmaking system was revamped in the summer of 2006, one year after its acquisition by Wolf Creek Golf Resort. The new system has dramatically improved the reliability of the resort's snow. Though its low elevation makes for a shorter ski season than most ski areas in Utah, the snowmaking provides a stable base for at least a few months each year.

== The Community ==
The surrounding community is also called Nordic Valley by locals.
