= Nordic Valley, Utah =

Unincorporated community in the state of Utah, United States

Nordic Valley
- Unincorporated community
- Location within the state of Utah
- Coordinates: 41°18′21″N 111°51′26″W
- Country: United States
- State: Utah
- County: Weber
- Elevation: 5,341 ft (1,628 m)
- Time zone: UTC-7 (Mountain (MST))
  - Summer (DST): UTC-6 (MDT)
- GNIS feature ID: 1453601

Nordic Valley or Nordic Valley Estates is an unincorporated community in Weber County, Utah, United States. It is part of the Ogden–Clearfield, Utah Metropolitan Statistical Area.

== Geography ==
Nordic Valley lies on an eastern slope in the Wasatch Range of the western greater Rocky Mountains in northern Utah. It is about 50 miles north of Salt Lake City and 15 miles east of Ogden. Nordic Valley sits at an elevation of about 6,000 feet and shares the mountainside with a ski resort of the same name. It is nestled into the west side of a high mountain valley known as the Ogden Valley on the western edge of the small town of Eden, sharing the valley with Liberty and Huntsville, as well as with the Pineview Reservoir. Across the valley to the east is Powder Mountain ski resort and to the south is Snowbasin, which hosted the 2002 Winter Olympic alpine skiing races for downhill, combined, and super-G.

== History ==
In the fall of 1960 Arthur Christiansen, a developer and past president of the Utah Home Builder's Association from Ogden, Utah, purchased the 900-acre mountainside Silver Bell Ranch from Taylor Burton in Liberty, Utah.

Arthur bought the property with the intention of developing it into a summer home area. Over time he sold about 200 one acre lots as well as 5 and 10 acre parcels, and built many homes in the development.

Arthur hired a man named Hatch, known to some in the region as a water witch, to find water sources for wells. Hatch found 4 sites and eventually 3 wells were drilled. The main well was located on top of the mountain overlooking the entire development. A reservoir was built to hold the water, and lines had to be dug deep enough so they wouldn't freeze in the severe high elevation winters. The water company, known as the Nordic Valley Water Company, was sold in about 1977, and roadways were eventually turned over to Weber County to maintain.

Arthur had plans to build a 9-hole golf course, and obtained the help of popular golf course designer Ernie Schneider Sr. The Nordic Valley Golf Course was opened to the public in about 1966 with 5 holes ready for play, the other 4 holes being completed about a year later. In the early 1970s Arthur sold the golf course and after being maintained as such for many years, part of it was eventually subdivided into homesites.

== Ski resort ==
In the mid 60's the hillside was a popular area for tobogganing, sledding and tubing. Plans were made to develop a ski hill with two chairlifts and several ski runs. In the latter part of the 60's, the Nordic Valley Ski Area was born. The sledding hill was equipped with a tow rope and soon became known as the beginner's ski hill. A few years later the ski area was expanded to include a double chairlift, and a short time later the tow rope on the beginner's hill was replaced with a 2nd chairlift.

Lights were installed along the main lift and down some of the runs. When looking at the hill from a distance at night, the positioning of the lights looked like the formation of the letter B on the side of the mountain which could be seen across the valley. With the completion of the lights, the ski hill was one of the first ski areas in Northern Utah to offer night skiing which soon became popular. Nordic Valley offered an affordable family atmosphere with an on site ski school, ski rental shop and bus transportation to and from Ogden twice a day on weekends. Group and family rates were offered plus the popular 'Ladies Night' where ladies skied free or at half price every Tuesday night. Arthur dreamed of expanding the ski area further but those plans were never realized.

In 1977 the ski hill, lodge, lifts, and the remaining ground was sold to Ski Associates. It was later purchased by Wolf Mountain Ski Resort LLC, who owned the resort until they declared bankruptcy in 2010. Skyline Mountain Base LLC purchased the resort from America First Credit Union in 2014. Skyline Mountain Base has changed the name back to Nordic Valley and has plans to enlarge and expand the resort over the next few years.

== Nordic influence ==
Arthur named the area Nordic Valley because of his Norwegian ancestry. Many names of the streets, ski runs, and the Nordic Valley Ski lodge, Odin Hall, are found in Norwegian folklore. As well as hosting many parties and gatherings, Odin Hall has housed the golf shop, ski rental, snack bar and ski patrol. Before it was a lodge, it was a hay barn complete with two hay shoots running from the basement to the roof, reaching two cupola vents situated on top of the barn.
