= Brent R. Taylor =

American politician (1979–2018)

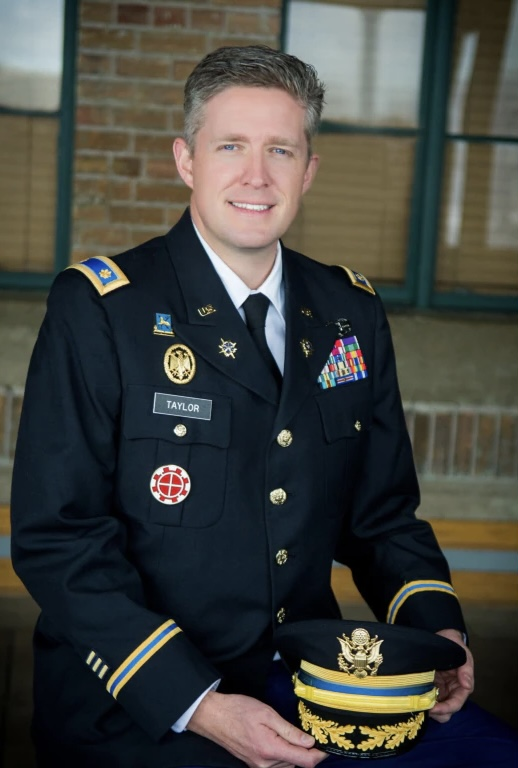

Mayor of North Ogden, Utah
- In office January 14, 2014 – November 3, 2018
- Preceded by: Richard Harris
- Succeeded by: Brent Chugg

Personal details
- Born: Brent Russell Taylor; July 6, 1979 Ogden, Utah, US
- Died: November 3, 2018 (aged 39) Kabul, Afghanistan
- Resting place: Ben Lomond Cemetery, North Ogden, Utah
- Spouse: Jennie Ashworth Taylor
- Children: 7
- Education: Brigham Young University; University of Utah (MPA)

Brent Russell Taylor (July 6, 1979 – November 3, 2018) was an American politician and Army National Guard officer. He served as mayor of North Ogden, Utah from January 2013 until November 2018, when he was killed while serving in Afghanistan.

== Biography ==
Taylor was born in Ogden, Utah.

He graduated from Chandler High School, in Chandler, Arizona, in 1997, where he was student body president.

Taylor was an Eagle Scout. He received his bachelor's degree from Brigham Young University, in political science, in 2006, and his master's degree, in public administration from University of Utah. Taylor was working on a doctorate in international relations at University of Utah in 2012.

Taylor served in the Utah Army National Guard for more than 15 years, of which at least 7 were on active duty. He served two tours in Iraq, where he worked as a convoy security commander and later as an advisor to an Iraqi national intelligence agency, and another two in Afghanistan, where he worked as a combat advisor to the Afghan Border Police.

Major Taylor was a recipient of the Bronze Star Medal, the Purple Heart with Oak Leaf Cluster, Meritorious Service Medal and the Army Commendation Medal.

Taylor was a member of the Church of Jesus Christ of Latter-day Saints.

== Political career ==
In 2009, Taylor was elected to a four-year term on the North Ogden City Council. He ran for mayor in 2013, receiving 56.79% of the vote, defeating fellow Council Member Wade Bigler. He ran unopposed in 2017 and was re-elected to a second term. On January 5, 2018, Taylor was ordered to deploy to Afghanistan later that month for a period of 400 days. He recommended Brent Chugg to serve as acting mayor during his absence, which was approved by the City Council. Chugg was sworn in on January 19.

== Death ==
On November 3, 2018, an Afghanistan soldier, Asfar Khan, who was part of the “Ktah Khas Afghanistan” unit Afghan National Army Commando Corps opened fire on Major Taylor and his guard during a training ruck march event outside of Camp Scorpion, a base near Kabul. Taylor was serving at Scorpion as part of NATO Special Operations Component Command–Afghanistan/Special Operations Joint Task Force– Afghanistan (NSOCC-A/SOJTF-A). The SOJTF-A United States special operations forces personnel at Camp Scorpion were involved in the Train, Advise, and Assist (TAA) mission, working specifically with the most elite Afghanistan military personnel. The Afghanistan personnel at Scorpion were selected from within the ANA Commandos and ANASOC Special Forces Kandaks, to serve in special mission units, one being the Ktah Khas, the “KKA” was also known as the Afghan Partnering Unit or APU. The APU personnel were highly trained by NATO Special Operations Forces, to conduct high risk direct action/counter terrorism operations alongside coalition SOF forces. The APU/KKA personnel were considered the most elite forces of Afghanistan and were also the most trusted by their NATO counterparts. During the ruck, Afghan Special Forces soldier, Asfar Khan, who Taylor was helping to train, fired two to three shots, hitting Taylor in the back of the head. His personal security guard, a U.S. Army member who was on the hike, was shot in the back but fired back at Khan. Afghan commandos shot Khan as he tried to escape, killing him. Taylor was killed and the other service member was injured. Other Afghan members killed Khan immediately after.

On January 8, 2019, Acting Mayor Chugg was chosen to serve out the remainder of Taylor's term.

In February 2019, the U.S. Senate passed a resolution to rename the North Ogden Department of Veterans Affairs Outstation as the Major Brent Taylor Vet Center Outstation.
