= PlayOn Sports =

American sports media company

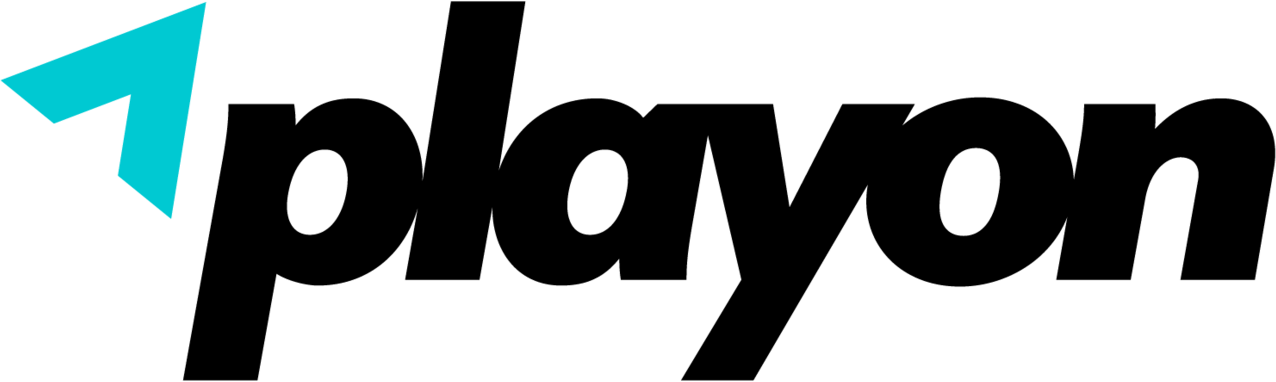
- Industry: Sports media
- Founded: August 2006; 20 years ago
- Founder: Turner Broadcasting System and WarnerMedia
- Subsidiaries: NFHS Network
- Website: playonsports.com

PlayOn! Sports Network is an American high school sports media company, an aggregator of high school sports video. It launched in 2006 and is headquartered in Atlanta, Georgia, with offices in the Midwest and California.

== History ==
The PlayOn! Sports Network began as a division of Turner Broadcasting System and Time Warner, Inc. The company launched in August 2006 and was then primarily focused on producing and digitally streaming collegiate sporting events. In 2008, it spun out from Turner Broadcasting. Their first high school sports broadcast came in early 2009 when the group produced a webcast of a Georgia state wrestling championship.

== Operating divisions ==
=== The NFHS Network ===
The NFHS Network is a joint venture of the National Federation of State High School Associations (NFHS), its member State Associations and PlayOn!. It began operations in August 2013.The NFHS is located in Indianapolis, Indiana, and is the national leadership organization for high school sports and performing arts activities. PlayOn! manages the day-to-day operations of the NFHS Network, which delivers live and on demand high school events at www.NFHSnetwork.com as well as through mobile apps.

=== School Broadcast Program ===
The NFHS Network created the School Broadcast Program (SBP) to provide member high schools with educational tools to help grow their own broadcast programs and assist the network with producing regular season games. Each school has a branded site on the NFHS Network that allows students to produce and distribute event videos throughout the year, including regular season sports, graduations, memorials, announcements and plays. The program provides students with hands-on production and broadcast experience while also promoting their high school, and also enables schools to earn money for programs.

In 2018, Pixellot and PlayOn! Sports partnered to bring automated sports production to U.S. high school sports, such as broadcast school events on the NFHS Network.

== See also ==
- National Federation of State High School Associations - joint operation of the online streaming NFHS Network
