= Pleasant View, Utah =

City in Utah, United States

- City
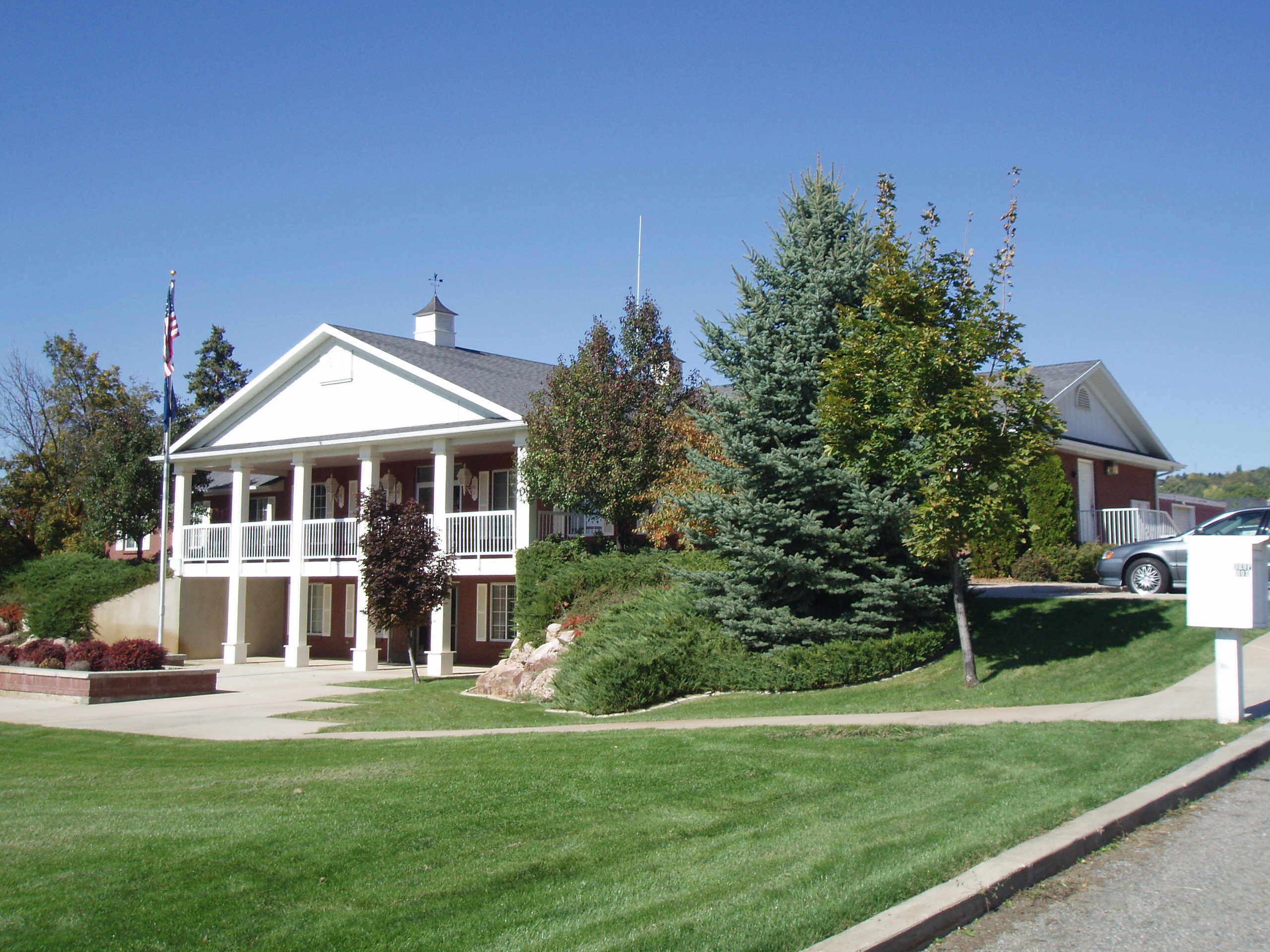
- Pleasant View City Hall, October 2011
- Motto: "A treasure in Ben Lomond's shadow."
- Location in Weber County and the state of Utah
- Coordinates: 41°19′32″N 111°59′54″W
- Country: United States
- State: Utah
- County: Weber
- Settled: 1850
- Incorporated: August 27, 1945
- Founder: John Mower

Area
  - Total: 6.98 sq mi (18.07 km^{2})
  - Land: 6.98 sq mi (18.07 km^{2})
  - Water: 0 sq mi (0.00 km^{2})
- Elevation: 4,502 ft (1,372 m)

Population (2020)
  - Total: 11,083
  - Density: 1,553.4/sq mi (599.79/km^{2})
- Time zone: UTC-7 (Mountain (MST))
  - Summer (DST): UTC-6 (MDT)
- ZIP codes: 84404, 84414
- Area codes: 385, 801
- FIPS code: 49-61150
- GNIS feature ID: 2411440
- Website: www.pleasantviewut.gov

Pleasant View is a city on the northern edge of Weber County, Utah, United States. The population was 11,083 at the 2020 census. It is part of the Ogden–Clearfield, Utah Metropolitan Statistical Area. It is a suburban community of Ogden.

== History ==
The city was considered part of North Ogden for its first 30 years, Pleasant View was known during its early days by several names, including West District, Hot Springs District, Stringtown, or simply Out West. The city was officially named Pleasant View in 1882 by Wilford Cragun, one of the first white children born in the area. Mary Lake, daughter of William Bailey Lake and Sarah Jane Marler was born in North Ogden, 15 December 1851. Other early settlers were Thomas Dunn, John Mower, and Simeon Cragun's families.

== Geography ==
According to the United States Census Bureau, the city has a total area of 6.7 square miles (17 km^{2}), all land.

== Demographics ==
Historical population
Census	Pop.	Note	%±
1890	336		—
1900	359		6.8%
1910	387		7.8%
1920	372		−3.9%
1930	430		15.6%
1940	437		1.6%
1950	420		−3.9%
1960	927		120.7%
1970	2,021		118.0%
1980	3,983		97.1%
1990	3,603		−9.5%
2000	5,632		56.3%
2010	7,979		41.7%
2020	11,083		38.9%
2023 (est.)	11,265		1.6%
U.S. Decennial Census

=== 2020 census ===
As of the 2020 census, Pleasant View had a population of 11,083. The median age was 33.1 years. 32.2% of residents were under the age of 18 and 12.0% of residents were 65 years of age or older. For every 100 females there were 100.1 males, and for every 100 females age 18 and over there were 97.4 males age 18 and over.

96.9% of residents lived in urban areas, while 3.1% lived in rural areas.

There were 3,319 households in Pleasant View, of which 46.3% had children under the age of 18 living in them. Of all households, 69.3% were married-couple households, 10.7% were households with a male householder and no spouse or partner present, and 16.6% were households with a female householder and no spouse or partner present. About 12.9% of all households were made up of individuals and 6.3% had someone living alone who was 65 years of age or older.

There were 3,420 housing units, of which 3.0% were vacant. The homeowner vacancy rate was 0.6% and the rental vacancy rate was 6.3%.

Racial composition as of the 2020 census
Race	Number	Percent
White	9,426	85.0%
Black or African American	60	0.5%
American Indian and Alaska Native	63	0.6%
Asian	183	1.7%
Native Hawaiian and Other Pacific Islander	24	0.2%
Some other race	550	5.0%
Two or more races	777	7.0%
Hispanic or Latino (of any race)	1,177	10.6%

=== 2010 census ===
At the 2010 census there were 7,979 people in 2,438 households, including 2,086 families, in the city. The population density was 837.2 people per square mile (323.1/km^{2}). There were 2,548 housing units at an average density of 281.7 per square mile (108.7/km^{2}). The racial makeup of the city was 93.1% White, 0.4% African American, 0.2% Native American, 0.9% Asian, 0.4% Pacific Islander, 3.1% from other races, and 1.9% from two or more races. Hispanic or Latino of any race were 7.3%.

Of the 2,438 households 39.1% had children under the age of 18 living with them, 74.4% were married couples living together, 7.6% had a female householder with no husband present, and 14.4% were non-families. 11.9% of households were one person and 5.4% were one person aged 65 or older. The average household size was 3.27 and the average family size was 3.57.

The age distribution was 32.9% under the age of 18, 7.9% from 18 to 24, 22.3% from 25 to 44, 25.2% from 45 to 64, and 11.7% 65 or older. The median age was 34.1 years. For every 100 females, there were 100.4 males. For every 100 females age 18 and over, there were 99.7 males.

The median household income was $62,123 and the median family income was $66,542. Males had a median income of $41,568 versus $30,308 for females. The per capita income for the city was $22,694. About 1.6% of families and 2.6% of the population were below the poverty line, including 3.9% of those under age 18 and none of those age 65 or over.

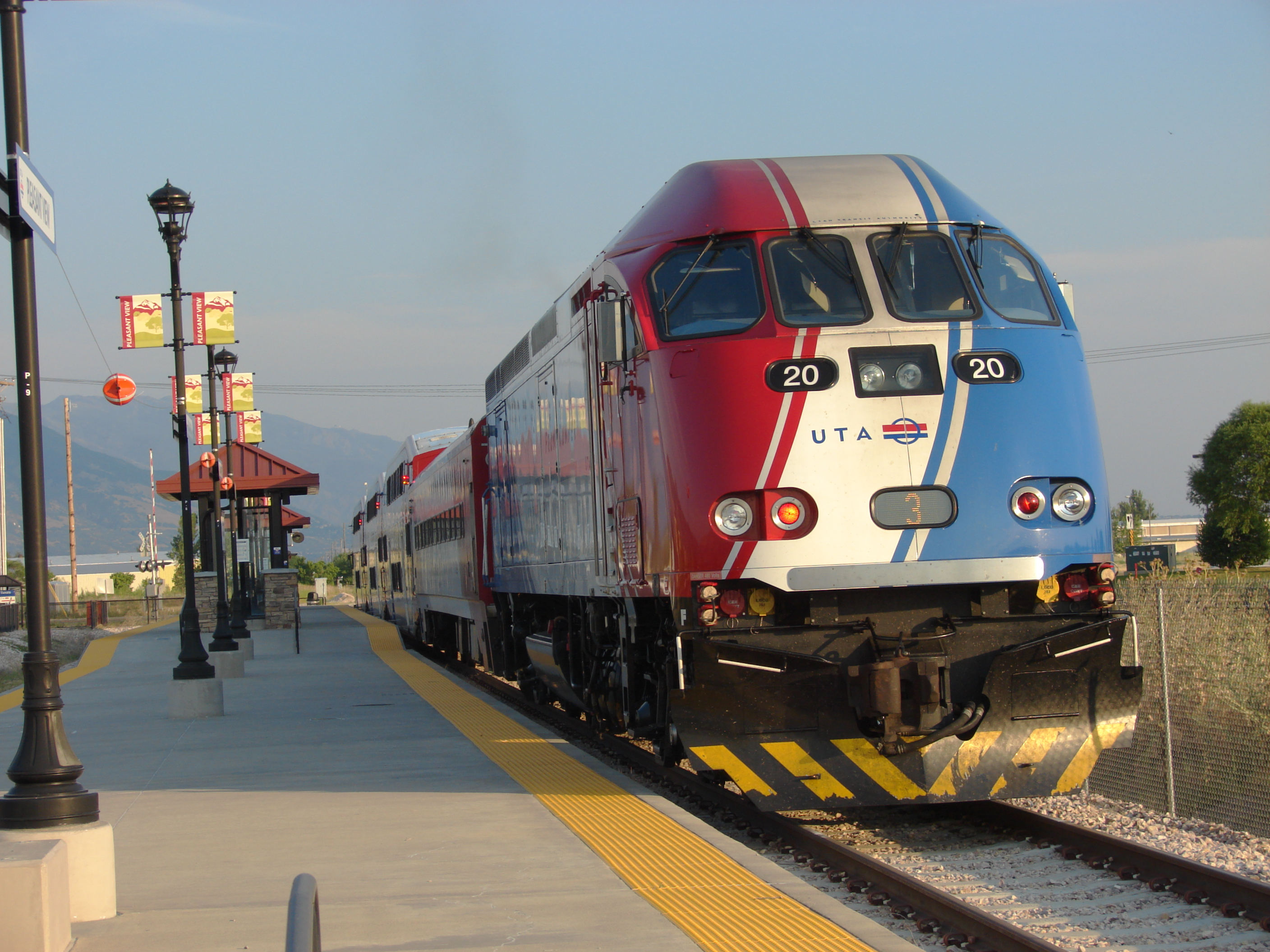
The FrontRunner at Pleasant View station, July 2014

== Points of interest ==
The area became a popular tourist stop because of the natural hot springs located in its north western corner that lies adjacent to Box Elder County. The Utah Hot Springs Resort was created at the site in the 1880s. During its peak, the facility offered visitors bathing and swimming pools, a hotel with 40 rooms, a dance hall, and a saloon where a mug of beer could be bought for five cents. The facility no longer exists.

Since 2008 until 2018 (until future line extension), the Pleasant View station has been (although for limited service) the northern end of Utah Transit Authority's commuter rail service, the FrontRunner.

== Education ==
Pleasant View is part of the Weber School District. It operates Weber High School, Orchard Springs Elementary School, and Lomond View Elementary School.

== See also ==
- List of cities and towns in Utah
