= North Ogden, Utah =

City in Utah, United States

North Ogden, Utah Opecarry
- City
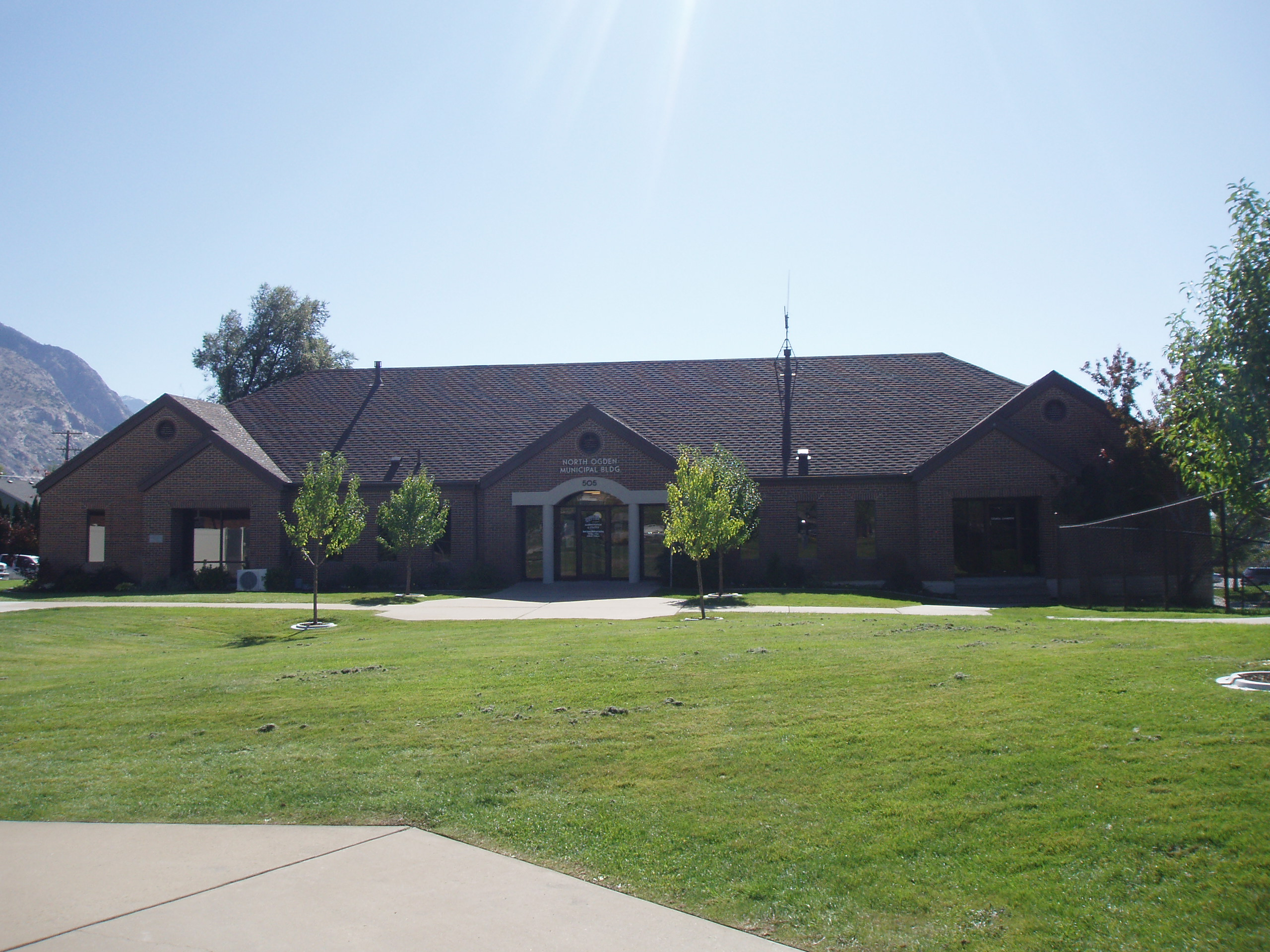
- City hall

- Location in Weber County and the state of Utah
- Coordinates: 41°18′44″N 111°57′30″W
- Country: United States
- State: Utah
- County: Weber
- Settled: 1850
- Incorporated: 1934
- Named for: Peter Skene Ogden

Area
  - Total: 7.51 sq mi (19.44 km^{2})
  - Land: 7.51 sq mi (19.44 km^{2})
  - Water: 0.0039 sq mi (0.01 km^{2})
- Elevation: 4,613 ft (1,406 m)

Population (2020)
  - Total: 20,916
  - Density: 2,787/sq mi (1,075.9/km^{2})
- Time zone: UTC-7 (Mountain (MST))
  - Summer (DST): UTC-6 (MDT)
- ZIP codes: 84404, 84414
- Area codes: 385, 801
- FIPS code: 49-55100
- GNIS feature ID: 2411275
- Website: www.northogdencity.gov

North Ogden is a city in Weber County, Utah, United States. The population was 20,916 at the 2020 census. North Ogden is on SR-235, three miles north of Ogden. It is a suburb of that city and is part of the Ogden-Clearfield metropolitan area.

== History ==
Among the first people to dwell in the North Ogden area were the Shoshone. The Shoshoni name for the area is “Opecarry,” which translates to “stick in the head.”

North Ogden was settled by European-American settlers during the winter of 1850 by two sets of cattle ranchers from Ogden. The Campbells and the Riddles had been warned by Brigham Young not to venture from the fort in Ogden due to the troubles with the local Shoshone. After a few months wintering their cattle, they were forced to return to Ogden in fear of Shoshone reprisals. The following year, after the trouble with the Shoshone had been partially settled, Jonathan Campbell returned with a number of other families to permanently settle the spot.

One important early industry in the mid to late 19th century was the sugar beet industry, and a processing and canning plant was built in the town for this. The owner of the canning plant during its operation was David Ephriam Randall. North Ogden also built a spur from the Union Pacific Station in Ogden, called the "Dummy Line". Large fruit orchards were developed and their harvest became an economic staple for the community, with the establishment of the North Ogden Fruit Exchange in 1924. This became the region's first fruit cooperative, using the railroad to sell fruit on the interstate market.

In the 1930s, increasing demand for water led the city to officially incorporate on February 1, 1934. David Gilbert Randall was elected the first mayor. He served in this position for ten years. That same decade saw the creation of the Cherry Days celebration on July 4. As North Ogden grew after World War II, it became a primary suburb for Ogden and other larger cities. Its industries flagged, and most agricultural areas began to be parcelled out for homes.

On November 3, 2018, after taking special leave from his mayoral position to serve in Afghanistan with the National Guard, Brent R. Taylor was shot and killed on duty by an Afghan commando. Every year a large American flag is suspended in the air above Coldwater Canyon to honor him and the Veterans of the United States Armed Forces.

== Geography ==
According to the United States Census Bureau, the city has a total area of 6.5 square miles (17 km^{2}), all land.

North Ogden is situated at the base of Ben Lomond Peak, a prominent mountain on the Wasatch Front, visible from the Salt Lake Airport.

== Demographics ==
Historical population
Census	Pop.	Note	%±
1870	683		—
1880	956		40.0%
1890	758		−20.7%
1900	850		12.1%
1910	579		−31.9%
1920	1,004		73.4%
1930	1,045		4.1%
1940	687		−34.3%
1950	1,105		60.8%
1960	2,621		137.2%
1970	5,257		100.6%
1980	9,309		77.1%
1990	11,668		25.3%
2000	15,026		28.8%
2010	17,357		15.5%
2020	20,916		20.5%
U.S. Decennial Census

=== 2020 census ===
As of the 2020 census, North Ogden had a population of 20,916. The median age was 34.8 years. 29.6% of residents were under the age of 18 and 14.4% of residents were 65 years of age or older. For every 100 females there were 98.0 males, and for every 100 females age 18 and over there were 96.1 males age 18 and over.

98.7% of residents lived in urban areas, while 1.3% lived in rural areas.

There were 6,661 households in North Ogden, of which 42.1% had children under the age of 18 living in them. Of all households, 68.1% were married-couple households, 11.0% were households with a male householder and no spouse or partner present, and 17.2% were households with a female householder and no spouse or partner present. About 14.9% of all households were made up of individuals and 7.5% had someone living alone who was 65 years of age or older.

There were 6,829 housing units, of which 2.5% were vacant. The homeowner vacancy rate was 0.8% and the rental vacancy rate was 3.1%.

Racial composition as of the 2020 census
Race	Number	Percent
White	18,238	87.2%
Black or African American	129	0.6%
American Indian and Alaska Native	95	0.5%
Asian	262	1.3%
Native Hawaiian and Other Pacific Islander	51	0.2%
Some other race	843	4.0%
Two or more races	1,298	6.2%
Hispanic or Latino (of any race)	2,078	9.9%

=== 2010 census ===
As of the 2010 census, there were 17,357 people, 5,569 households, and 4,633 families residing in the city. The population density was 2,310.4 people per square mile (892.1 people/km^{2}). There were 5,799 housing units at an average density of 701.5 units per square mile (270.9 units/km^{2}). The racial makeup of the city was 94.3% White, 0.5% African American, 0.4% Native American, 0.9% Asian, 0.2% Pacific Islander, 1.8% from other races, and 1.9% from two or more races. Hispanic or Latino of any race were 5.4% of the population.

There were 5,569 households, out of which 39.6% had children under the age of 18 living with them, 71.2% were married couples living together, 8.6% had a female householder with no husband present, and 16.8% were non-families. 14.8% of all households were made up of individuals, and 5.0% had someone living alone who was 65 years of age or older. The average household size was 3.40 and the average family size was 3.68.

In the city, the population was spread out, with 31.4% under the age of 18, 8.7% from 18 to 24, 24.5% from 25 to 44, 24.2% from 45 to 64, and 11.2% who were 65 years of age or older. The median age was 32.9 years. For every 100 females, there were 101.2 males. For every 100 females age 18 and over, there were 98.8 males.

The median income for a household in the city was $59,556, and the median income for a family was $63,252. Males had a median income of $43,712 versus $28,180 for females. The per capita income for the city was $20,625. About 3.1% of families and 3.6% of the population were below the poverty line, including 3.9% of those under age 18 and 3.1% of those age 65 or over.

== Notable people ==
- Julia Bachison, Miss Utah 2005
- Leanne Barrette, professional bowler and member of the USBC and PWBA Halls of Fame
- Blair Buswell, sculptor for the Pro Football Hall of Fame 1983–present
- Dee Hock, founder and CEO of the Visa credit card association.
- Nick Howell, college football coach 2008–present
- Kelsey Nixon, Food Network
- Bill Orton, U.S. Congressman
- Brent R. Taylor, mayor of North Ogden and United States Army officer

== Federal Representation ==
North Ogden is located in Utah's First Congressional District For the 118th United States Congress, Utah's First Congressional District is represented by Blake Moore (R Salt Lake City)
