= Hugo Morales (radio) =

Executive Director and co-founder of Radio Bilingüe Inc.

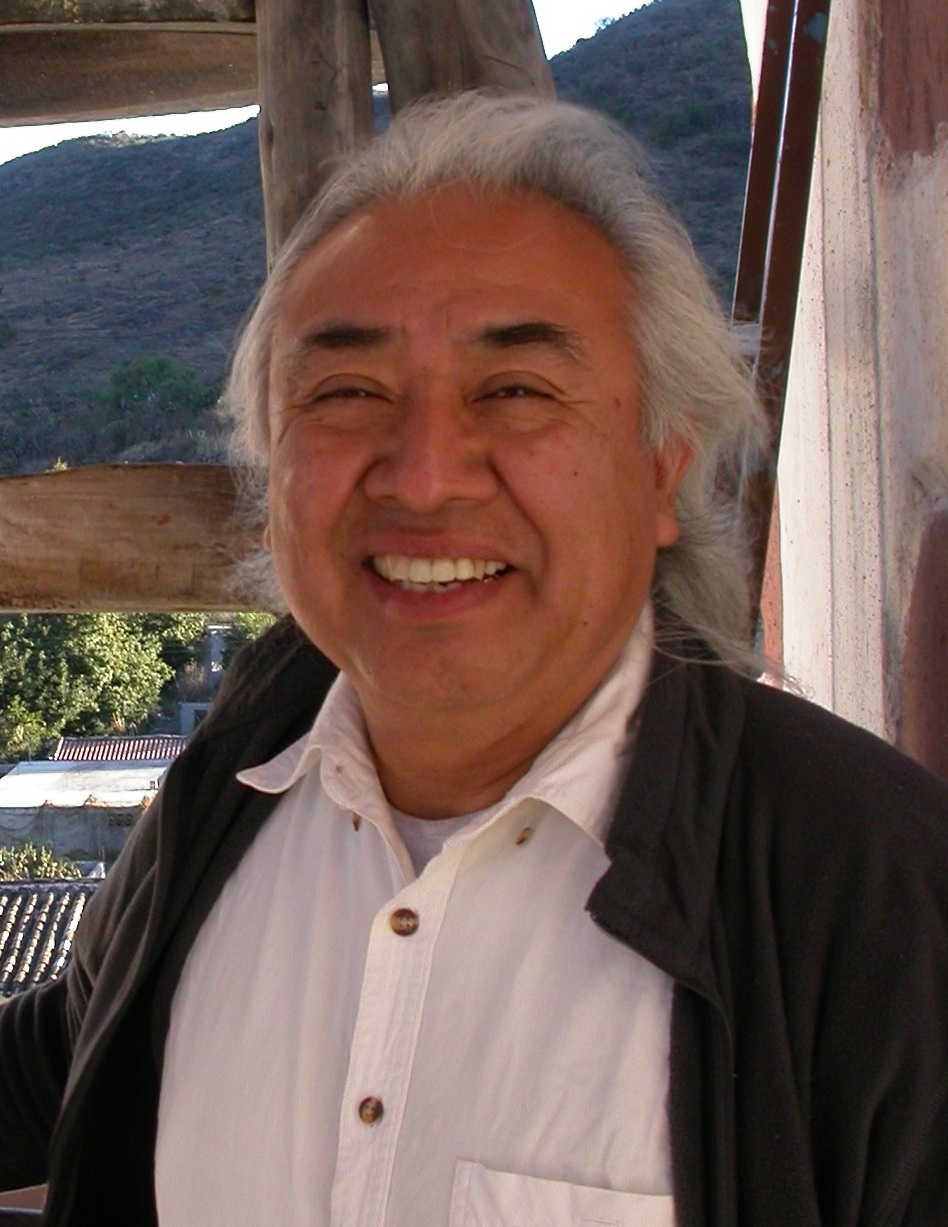
- Morales in his village in Oaxaca, Mexico, 2004
- Born: Hugo Noé Morales
- Education: Harvard University (AB, JD)

Hugo Noé Morales is the executive director and co-founder, in 1976, of Radio Bilingüe Inc., the national Latino public radio network. He manages the operations and service delivery for this non-profit organization. The group represents Latino and other minority communities. Radio Bilingüe provides a radio service in Spanish, English, and Mixtec via satellite. His duties include developing programs, fundraising, and managing staff, the board of directors, and public relations.

== Major highlights ==
- Organized a Latino grass roots board of directors in 1976 and incorporated Radio Bilingue in 1977
- Played a major role in the fund raising for every radio series that Radio Bilingue has produced in its history which includes the areas that most impact Latinos- the traditional arts, health and health care insurance, civic engagement, the environment, access to higher education, immigration, economic opportunity, parenting education, promotion and advocating to broadband, etc.
- Attracted professional Latino journalist to work at Radio Bilingue and this team has defined what authentic radio in Spanish can be in the U.S.
- Oversaw the construction of a full-power FM radio station (KSJV) with the most coverage of any FM radio signal in the Central Valley of California.
- Supervised the construction of KMPO-FM in Modesto, 1984
- Intervened to save the last full-power FM signal for use by the Latino community in Denver, Colorado, (KUVO), 1984
- Filed for full-power FM (KTQX) for Bakersfield, California, 1984
- Filed for last full-power educational FM for Imperial Valley (KUBO), 1984
- Intervened to save the last full-power educational signal for San Antonio, Texas (Texas Public Radio), 1985
- Co-organizer of Fresno Tomorrow, a community effort to address at risk youth issues for youth in Fresno, 1987
- Spokesperson for funding allocation reform from the Corporation for Public Broadcasting on behalf of communities of color and radio independent producers at the national level and testified before Congress on their behalf, 1991
- Organized Latino controlled stations and regional public radio organizations in the U.S. to recognize Radio Bilingue as the national public radio service for Latinos in the U.S.; negotiated with all major stakeholders in public radio to provide free of charge public radio satellite channels to Radio Bilingue for national distribution of Latino programming and an additional channel for a similar service to Native Americans, 1991
- Intervened to transfer the license of a low-power FM station in Chicago to the Mexican Museum in Chicago to serve the Latino barrio, 1994
- Assisted four Mexican-American grass-roots organizations to file for new full-power FM radio stations in California, Oregon, Arizona, and Texas. One construction permit has been awarded to Escuela de La Raza Unida in Blythe, California. (2007–present)
- Filed for nine full-power FM stations along the U.S.-Mexico border in 2008, four have been awarded, and Radio Bilingue is building them under Hugo Morales's supervision
- Led a Radio Bilingue team to compete for an secure a ten million dollar grant from the Corporation for Public Broadcasting for the opportunity to define what an authentic public media service for Los Angeles, CA can be for its diverse ethnic populations of Latinos, African Americans and Asians, 2008
- Filed for three full-power FM radio stations, two in California (Wesley and Hemet) and one in The Dalles, Oregon, 2010

== Education ==
- Harvard Law School, J.D., 1975
- Harvard College, A.B., 1972
- Healdsburg High School, 1968
- Escuela Papa Pio XI, Huajuapam de Leon, Oaxaca, Mexico 1945-58
- Escuela particular, Tequixtepec, Huajuapam de Leon, Oaxaca, Mexico 1953

== Background and education ==
Hugo Noe Morales Rosas was born on March 23, 1949, in Cuyotepeji, Huajuapam de Leon, Oaxaca, in La Mixteca Baja in Southern Mexico. He is the co-founder and executive director of Radio Bilingue, Inc., the National Latino Public Radio Network, a nonprofit media producer, distributor and broadcaster. Hugo Morales serves and has served on several private foundation board of directors including, The San Francisco Foundation, The California Endowment, The Rosenberg Foundation and on several higher education panels which includes working as trustee of The California State University System. Morales has been a pioneer on Latino new media through a project he confounded, Los Angeles Public Media, that for a short time launched an innovative cross ethnic English language website that targeted educated youth Latinos, African Americans and Asians in greater Los Angeles.

Hugo, the second child of Rafael Morales Mendoza and Concepcion Rosas Hernandez, both Mixteco indigenas, began his schooling in Tequixtepec, Huajuapam de Leon Oaxaca, the village of his father. At the age of four his mother enrolled him a in catholic elementary school, Escuela Pio XI, the town of Huajuapam de Leon. During the third grade his father managed to have the rest of the family emigrate to Healdsburg, California to join him at a farm labor camp. Morales attended West Side Elementary School where he learned English on the fly since he was the only non-English speaking student in the classroom. He was home schooled for a month at Oak Knoll Sanitarium in Santa Rosa during his 7th grade when he was recovering from tuberculosis for a year. Hugo returned to Healdsburg public schools for the 8th grade. At Healdsburg High School he co-founded the school newspaper, joined the debate team and was elected student body president. In 1972 Hugo received his A.B. degree from Harvard College. He received his J.D. degree in 1975 from the Harvard Law School. While at Harvard College as a junior he joined the volunteer staff of WHRB where he founded the Latino service for the Boston area through "La Hora", a bilingual Puerto Rican and Chicago musical, news and information program which continued until 1985. In his senior year he co-founded Harvard-Radcliffe Raza, the Latino student support group for Harvard College and Radcliffe College. Harvard-Radcliffe Raza has grown to a typical membership of 150 undergraduates. During Hugo's senior year, he led a lecture series at the Harvard Institute of Politics on Chicano politics that introduced the Harvard community to the Latino civic unrest over disparities that included civic efforts of La Raza Unida Party. He was privileged to have an office at the Harvard Institute of Politics during the 1971–72 school year. During his tenure at Harvard Law School, after his second year he continued with "La Hora" after Juan Arambula '73 had assumed its responsibility for a year. While also at Harvard Law School he was the chairman of the Boston area Latino student support group, MECHA. During his Law School years he also was a Proctor, a Harvard College resident advisor, at Greenough at Harvard College.

== Career ==
After Harvard Law School in 1975, Hugo Morales joined the staff of the California Agricultural Labor Relations Board in Fresno, California.

In 1976, Morales joined the faculty of California State University in Fresno as an adjunct lecturer in the La Raza Studies program. In September 1976 Hugo organized Radio Bilingue in the Mexican-American barrio in Fresno, California. He teamed up with a 16-year-old engineer, Steve Weber, Jr. to build the first Radio Bilingue full power FM radio station, KSJV-FM.

On July 4, 1980, KSJV-FM went on the air with five paid staff and over forty volunteers of farmworkers, teachers, students and artists with traditional Mexican music in the likes of traditional ranchera singers Lola Beltran and Jose Alfredo Jimenez.

Radio Bilingue has been a creative organization that has attracted talented individuals. Some highlights of the Radio Bilingue team include the following:

- In 1984, Radio Bilingue produced the first Spanish media coverage of the Republican and Democratic national conventions.
- In 1984, Radio Bilingue, began broadcasting out of Modesto, the project led by the station manager, Ms. Eva Torres.
- In 1984, Radio Bilingue collaborated with Tom Thomas and Terry Clifford to maintain the frequency what became KUVO in Denver on the noncommercial band as the construction permit was about to expire. The same happened later that year for what is now KVBH, Texas Public, in San Antonio Texas.
- In 1985, Radio Bilingue, with the support of The Rosenberg Foundation, established the first Latino community radio national news service in the United States under the leadership of Samuel Orozco, Noticiero Latino, a five-minute newscast that reports on topics of most concern for Latinos- the economy, health care access, education, immigration, the arts and literature, etc.
- In 1985, Hugo joined Mr. Lew Butler and others in the formation of California Tomorrow, a California nonprofit committed to the research in education on immigrants and communities of color in California.
- In 1988, Radio Bilingue opened its first full power FM on the U.S.-Mexico border, KUBO, Calexico serving the Imperial Valley in the U.S. and Mexico's one million in the city of Mexicali. That same year Radio Bilingue began broadcasting out of Bakersfield, California, KTQX the southern part of the San Joaquin Valley.
- In 1992, Radio Bilingue acquired station KHDC, a full power FM radio station serving the Salians Valley and San Cruz county in California.
- In 1993, Hugo received the highest award from the public radio regional organizations, the xxxx award.
- In 1994, Hugo became the first resident of the San Joaquin Valley to win a MacArthur Foundation "genius" award.
- In 1995, Radio Bilingue, with support of The Corporation for Public Broadcasting, began to produce and distribute Linea Abierta, the first and only national live interactive civic and cultural mid hour talk show in Spanish in the United States.
- In 1997, Hugo won the Edward E. Murrow award- the highest award from The Corporation for Public Broadcasting for the public radio industry.
- In 2009, Radio Bilingue built KVUH, a full power FM serving Mendocino County and parts of Humboldt county in northern California.
- In 2012, Radio Bilingue under the coordination of Maria Erana, Director for Broadcasting, built K in Douglas, Arizona, along the U.S.-Mexico border; Radio Bilingue also built K in Alamosa, Colorado in the San Luis Valley, another full power FM in Raton, New Mexico, and K in Chama New Mexico in northern New Mexico. Maria also led the construction of K in Hurley, New Mexico, near Las Cruzes New Mexico.
- In 2012, Radio Bilingue, under Hugo's leadership assisted several grass roots community groups file for low power radio stations, including a Mixteco group in Oxnard, California, a Latino arts group in the Coachella Valley in southern California and three Latino community groups in the greater Los Angeles area.
- In 2013, under Hugo's leadership Radio Bilingue, built K in the Crystal City area in south Texas, formerly a stronghold in the 1960s for La Raza Unida Party.
- In 2013, Radio Bilingue assisted in the construction of a full power FM in the Rio Grande Valley in Rio Grande City.
- Radio Bilingue has 12 full power FM radio station in the Southwest; it produces the only Spanish language independent radio news service in Spanish: Noticiero Latino and Produces the only live interactive national talk show for Latinos in Spanish- Linea Abierta. Radio Bilingue hosts the national Latino conversation.

== Employment ==
- 1980 to Present: Executive Director for Radio Bilingue, Inc.
- 1976 to 1979: Adjunct Lecturer, La Raza Studies Program, CSU, Fresno
- 1975 (August- December): Law Graduate, Legal Department, Agricultural Labor Relations Board, Fresno Regional Office
- 1975 (Summer): Volunteer, UFW Legal Department
- 1958 to 1974: Seasonal farm labor employment at Russian River farms in Healdsburg, California

== Current community service ==
- Board member, California State University (Appointed by Gov. on 07/06/12; Term expires 03/01/20)
- The Rosenberg Foundation (Appointed in 2002; board chair March 2009 to March 2011)
- Trustee, The California Endowment (April, 2004. Term expires ~May 2013)
- Trustee, The San Francisco Foundation (Appointed in 2002; Term expires 08/31/12)
- Founding Board Member, UC Merced Foundation (Appointed in 2003)
- Board Member, California Endowment Health Journalism Fellowship Program Advisory Board (Appointed in 2004)
- Commissioner, First 5 Fresno (Appointed October 26, 2004)
- Commissioner, California Postsecondary Education Commission (First appointed on June 11, 2003, for a 6-year term (expired on 2009)). Reappointed to represent the general public on February 20, 2008. Hugo's term would have expired on December 31, 2013. CPEC funding eliminated from 2011 to 2012 state budget resulting in agency closing November 18, 2011)
- Board Member, Latino Public Radio Consortium (Appointed in 2009)
- Board Member, California State University, Fresno Advisory Board (Appointed in 1994; Resigned on 07/12/12 b/c of CSU appointment)

-Partial List of Other Community Service-

- Founder of Harvard-Radcliffe Raza- the Harvard College Latino student support group in 1972
- Founder of "La Hora", the Latino two-hour live radio show out of the studios of the Harvard University radio station, WHRB. "La Hora" served the local Puerto Rican (Boricua) Boston community on Saturdays and the Mexican-American and other Latino population on Sunday evenings with volunteers from these communities inside and outside Harvard University.
- Harvard Institute of Politics: led year-long seminar on "Chicago Politics" at the Institute by introducing the contemporary political landscape of Mexican-American through a speakers series of Mexican-American activists.
- Chicano-Boricua studies Proposal for Harvard University; coauthor of proposal for Chicano-Boricua Studies at Harvard and member of student negotiating team with Dean Board Member, Central California Legal Services (1979-2007)
- Accrediting Commission for Senior Colleges and Universities of the Western Association of Schools and Colleges (WASC). (1998-2004= two terms, 3 years/term; 1998-2001 and 2001–2004)
- Universal Service Task Force for Pacific Bell (2000-2008)
- Member, PG&E/Greenlining Partnership (1988-2008)
- Emeritus Board Member, The Alliance for California Traditional Arts, ACTA (2002-2007)
- Board Member, California Tomorrow (1985-2011)
- Member of NALEO (application submitted on 12/12/12

Hugo Morales’ work has been featured in The New York Times, The Los Angeles Times, Parade Magazine, The Fresno Bee, The Washington Post, The Dallas Morning News, Harvard Alumni Magazine, Harvard Law Bulletin, NBC's Today Show, and the PBS Latino series Heritage.

== Affiliations in philanthropy ==
- 1992-2002: Hugo Morales joined the board of the Rosenberg Foundation based in San Francisco; a foundation known for its willingness to take risks to improve the lives of children and families.
- 1993-2003: Hugo joined the board of The San Francisco Foundation with a portfolio of 1 billion dollars. Hugo was termed out in 2012.
- 1993-2003: Morales also joined the board of The California Endowment- a California Health foundation with over 3 billion dollars in assets. Hugo's term ended in May, 2013.
- In 2005 Hugo was appointed by Fresno Supervisor Juan Arambula, Harvard '73 to The Fresno County's First Five Commission, a county fund that awards grants to nonprofits addressing the needs of children 0–5; Hugo was reappointed by Supervisor Henry Perea in 2006.

== Civic affiliations ==
- 1979-2010: Board member of Central California Legal Services
- 1985-2011: Board of California Tomorrow, a California nonprofit
- 2012- Hugo was appointed by Governor Jerry Brown to an 8-year term as a trustee of the California State University system. The CSU is the largest university of its kind in the United States with 21 campuses spanning the state of California, with some 40,000 faculty and 48,000 students.

== Awards and honors ==
- Honorary doctorate from Harvard University, 2023
- National Heritage Fellowship (the United States government's highest honor in the folk and traditional arts, awarded by the National Endowment for the Arts), 2020
- Honorary degree of Doctor of Fine Arts from California State University, Sacramento, 2011
- Bader Award (the highest award given for lifetime achievement by the National Federation of Community Broadcasters), 2007
- Cultural Freedom Award (Lannan Foundation), 2006
- Director's Award (California Arts Council's award for extraordinary contribution to the arts in California), 2002
- The Cesar Chavez Award in Education (the highest award given by Association of Mexican-American Education (AMAE), 2000
- Honorary degree of Doctor of Humane Letters from California State University, Fresno, 1999
- The Susan G. Hadden Pioneer Award (given by the Alliance for Public Technology for ensuring equitable access to information for the Spanish-speaking population in the U.S. and Mexico), 1999
- Edward R. Murrow Award (the highest award given by the Corporation for Public Broadcasting), 1999
- MacArthur Fellows Program, 1994
