= WCSM =

WCSM may refer to:

- WCSM (AM), a radio station (1350 AM) licensed to Celina, Ohio, United States
- WCSM-FM, a radio station (96.7 FM) licensed to Celina, Ohio, United States
