= Celina High School =

Celina High School may refer to:

- Celina High School (Ohio) — Celina, Ohio
- Celina High School (Celina, Tennessee) — Celina, Tennessee
- Celina High School (Texas) — Celina, Texas
