= Z. Susanne Aikman =

American broadcaster

- Born: January 1, 1945; Dayton, Ohio, U.S.
- Died: June 21, 2014 (age 69); Denver, Colorado, U.S.
- Other names: Susie Aikman
- Occupation(s): Broadcaster, beadworker, television director

Zora Susanne Aikman (January 1, 1945 – June 21, 2014) was an American broadcaster and beadworker. She created and hosted the nationally syndicated radio program alterNative Voices, beginning in 1992, and worked in Colorado public television. She wrote two books on Native American beadwork.

== Early life and education ==
Aikman was born in Dayton, Ohio, and raised in Zanesville and Celina, the daughter of Herbert Abraham Aikman Jr. and Zora Dell Miller Aikman. She was described as a member of the Eastern Band Cherokee, or descended from that group. She graduated from Celina High School in 1963, and attended Columbus College of Art and Design, Ohio State University, and Metropolitan State University of Denver.

== Career ==
Aikman created and hosted the radio program alterNative Voices beginning in 1992. Her show aired on 54 radio stations, and was among the first offerings of the radio network American Indian Radio on Satellite. She contributed to the Smithsonian Institution's radio series, Living Voices, in 1997. She directed and produced programming for Colorado Public Television for twenty years.

Beyond radio and television work, Aikman was active in Native American ministries of the United Methodist Church, and served on several national boards in that work. In 1998, she spoke on a panel on Native American culture at the National Civil Rights Museum in Tennessee. In 2010, she visited almost a hundred Native American reservations, as part of a campaign to promote participation in the federal census that year. She co-owned a design studio and photography gallery, Path-of-the-Sun Images, in Denver, and another business called Wind River Rose.

== Publications ==
- A Primer: The Art of Native American Beadwork (1980)
- Bead Workbook: Designer Pages to Color (1991)

== Personal life and legacy ==
Aikman married William V. McGough in 1966. They divorced in 1975. She died from cancer in 2014, at the age of 69. The Iliff School of Theology has a Susie Aikman Memorial Scholarship for Native American Students, funded as a memorial to Aikman. The radio program InDigitNess Voice aired a tribute to Aikman on KUVO in Denver in 2014, and repeated that program in 2019.
