= KHDC =

Radio Bilingüe radio station in Chualar, California

- Chualar, California; United States
- Broadcast area: Salinas Valley, California
- Frequency: 90.9 MHz

Programming
- Languages: Spanish, English
- Format: Variety
- Network: Radio Bilingüe

Ownership
- Owner: Radio Bilingüe, Inc.

History
- First air date: June 1981
- Former call signs: KUBO (1981–1986)

Technical information
- Licensing authority: FCC
- Facility ID: 54497
- Class: A
- ERP: 3,000 watts
- HAAT: 59.0 meters (193.6 ft)
- Transmitter coordinates: 36°34′53.8″N 121°26′37.7″W
- Translator: 94.5 K233AV (Paso Robles)

Links
- Public license information: Public file; LMS
- Website: radiobilingue.org

KHDC (90.9 FM) is a radio station licensed to Chualar, California, United States, serving the Salinas Valley and Monterey areas. The station is owned by Radio Bilingüe and maintains studios on Main Street in Oldtown Salinas and a transmitter near Chualar. Some programs from Radio Bilingüe originate from the Salinas studio.

Since signing on in 1981 as KUBO, this station has been a bilingual public radio outlet catering to the needs of the Spanish-speaking community in the Salinas Valley and offering other specialty music and talk programs. As an independent public station under the ownership of the Voces Unidas Bilingual Broadcasting Foundation from 1981 to 1986 and the California Human Development Commission from 1986 to 1994, the station constantly struggled financially, as its working-class audience lacked the resources to consistently support it.

== History ==
On June 25, 1976, the Central Coast Counties Development Corporation applied to build a new non-commercial radio station on 90.9 MHz to serve Chualar. The station was planned as a bilingual station to serve farmworkers and others in the Spanish-speaking community. A frequency had become unexpectedly available for this service because of the inactivity of KAUG, a station owned by the Salinas Union High School District and run by students. This 10-watt station had gone off the air because its faculty advisor, the only person with the qualifications to operate it, took a leave of absence to study in Europe. This prompted Central Coast Counties to think that its broadcast license had expired, so it filed for the same frequency. The Federal Communications Commission (FCC) granted a construction permit on April 2, 1979, and the permit was transferred to a new organization, Voces Unidas Bilingual Broadcasting Foundation, in an action approved July 7, 1980.

Voces Unidas set out to build the new station. It built studios in a 19th-century house on Main Street in Oldtown Salinas and a transmitter on a site near Chualar. It began broadcasting in June 1981 with a mix of local programming as well as programs produced by NPR. The station had only eight paid staff members by 1982, so most labor was volunteer, including newscasting and production.

KUBO spent its early years in a state of consistent financial precarity. It had to convince people to support it financially even though the concept was relatively new; its listeners were working-class, which contrasted with the upscale audience of many traditional public stations and limited its ability to raise money from its listeners, and it signed on amid federal and state cutbacks in support for public broadcasting. By 1984, it was warned that the station needed state money or it would go off the air. The board of Voces Unidas Bilingual Broadcasting Foundation recognized that the station needed to be sold or it would close. The California Human Development Corporation, a non-profit social services agency, won out over another bidder because it proposed to maintain KUBO's format.

Under new KHDC call letters, the station continued to broadcast programs in English and Spanish, but it broadened its output to include programming in 10 languages by 1989, including French, Portuguese, Japanese, and Filipino. It was off the air for three weeks after the Loma Prieta earthquake. During this time, the station was still saddled with debt from its original ownership, and it struggled to generate sufficient local financial support. In April 1990, it fired the general manager, Dick Solis, who claimed that fundraising goals set by the corporation were unrealistic and stated that local businesses had little interest in underwriting programs on KHDC. The California Human Development Corporation became involved in the operations of KBBF in Santa Rosa, whose officials decried attempts by KHDC to hire KBBF's general manager.

California Human Development Corporation put KHDC on the market in June 1992. During this time, the station added new programs in English, including an evening hip-hop and rap show. KHDC remained on the market until Radio Bilingüe acquired it at the start of 1994, ensuring that it continued to serve the local Spanish-speaking community. The station reduced its English-language output but kept a Hawaiian music program, introducing Radio Bilingüe's national Spanish-language programming to its lineup. In the 2000s, changes at KHDC and a reduction in Hawaiian-language programming prompted the supporters and producers of its Hawaiian programming to seek a new outlet. In 2004, Ohana de Watsonville opened KAPU-LP 104.7.

== Programming originating in Salinas ==
Some programs for Radio Bilingüe originate in the Salinas studio; in 2013, 40 volunteers worked in Salinas compared to 30 in Fresno because Salinas was home to many audience participation programs. Some volunteers and programs have lengthy histories; Randy Novelli, who used the on-air name DJ Kazzeo, hosted a hip-hop program, Wednesday Wreck, from 1993 until his 2025 death. A weekly program, Alza tu Voz/Speak Out, is part of a youth training program in radio and airs only on KHDC.

== See also ==
- List of community radio stations in the United States
