= KEPH =

KEPH may refer to:

- Keph.fr A French transmedia siteweb belonging to David TRIVES
- Ephrata Municipal Airport (ICAO code KEPH)
- KEPH-LP, a low-power radio station (95.3 FM) licensed to serve Friendswood, Texas, United States
- KEPH (Utah), a defunct radio station in Ephraim, Utah, on 89.5 FM
