= Hugo Morales =

Hugo Morales may refer to:

- Hugo Morales (footballer)
- Hugo Morales (radio)
