= AIROS Native Radio Network =

American Indian Radio on Satellite or AIROS was a service that transmitted Native American radio programs between producers and radio stations via satellite. It also distributed radio programming directly to listeners via the Internet. Its satellite service ran from 1994 to 2006. It was operated by Native American Public Telecommunications.

== Programming ==
AIROS carried a variety of Native American radio programming, including news and music. Although primarily a distributor, it produced some of its own programming.

Two of the programs AIROS carried have become among the longest-running Native American radio programs. The music program Native Sounds Native Voices originated in the studios of KZUM. It was first broadcast in Lincoln, Nebraska, in 1994. Native American Calling is a call-in talk show. AIROS carried its national premiere on June 5, 1995. Initially, it was jointly produced by AIROS and the Alaska Public Radio Network and originated from the studios of KUNM, Albuquerque, New Mexico. In 2001, the New York Times described Native American Calling as very popular. By 2006, it was produced by Koahnic and was one of the best-known Native American radio programs.

== Distribution ==
In the 1990s, satellite communications were considered especially useful for reaching radio stations in remote locations that did not have access to services like special high-quality telephone lines or the Internet. AIROS started its satellite distribution network in 1994. AIROS used the Public Radio Satellite System. As a result, its programming was available to public radio stations across the United States, not just Native American stations. The number of stations AIROS served grew from 29 in 1995 to 50 in 2000 and 77 in 2001, including Native American and other stations in the United States and Canada. In 2001, The New York Times described AIROS as the "primary distribution system for (Native American) public radio". AIROS satellite operations ended in 2006, when Koahnic won the contract to distribute Native American programming over the Public Radio Satellite System.

By 2014, Koahnic's Native Voice One and Radio Bilingüe were the two indigenous radio networks in the United States. Like AIROS, both used the Public Radio Satellite System.

AIROS also used the Internet to connect producers, radio broadcasters and listeners. In 1997, AIROS initiated webcasts, reaching the large urban Native American population out of reach of Native American radio stations. AIROS claimed it had one of the first web sites to provide live-streaming. Broadcast stations continued to be the primary means of reaching American Indians on reservations lacking reliable Internet. AIROS live streaming ended in December 2010. Podcasts continued for a few more years.

== See also ==
- NATV Native American Television
- Satélite Radio Bilingüe, which distributes native and other Spanish language programming via satellite
- Z. Susanne Aikman
