= NATV =

NATV may mean:

- National Assembly TV, a public-access television cable TV channel for National Assembly of South Korea
- North Allegheny Television, a public-access television cable TV channel near Pittsburgh, Pennsylvania
- NATV Native American Television, an American television channel for Native Americans
