= KZCL =

KZCL may refer to:

- KZCL-LP, a low-power radio station (101.5 FM) licensed to serve Cleveland, Texas, United States
- KUEU, a radio station (90.5 FM) licensed to serve Logan, Utah, United States, which held the call sign KZCL from 2005 to 2011
