= WKKI =

Radio station in Celina, Ohio

- Celina, Ohio; United States
- Broadcast area: Lima, Ohio
- Frequency: 94.3 MHz
- Branding: K94-3

Programming
- Format: Classic hits
- Affiliations: Cleveland Browns Radio Network; Cincinnati Reds Radio Network

Ownership
- Owner: The Sonshine Communications Corporation

History
- First air date: December 18, 1960 (as WMER)
- Former call signs: WMER (1960–1978)

Technical information
- Licensing authority: FCC
- Facility ID: 60848
- Class: A
- Power: 5,200 watts
- HAAT: 108 meters
- Transmitter coordinates: 40°33′8.00″N 84°30′46.00″W

Links
- Public license information: Public file; LMS
- Webcast: Listen live
- Website: k943.com

WKKI (94.3 FM) is a radio station broadcasting a classic hits format. Licensed to Celina, Ohio, United States, the station serves the Lima area. The station is currently owned by The Sonshine Communications Corporation.

In December 2006, the station changed to its classic hits format from its former adult contemporary format.

== History ==
The station was founded in 1960 as WMER, a reference to MERcer County, making it the county's first commercial radio station, transmitting with only 740 watts from its studios located above The Celina Music Store at 128 West Fayette Street in downtown Celina. The music store's owner at the time was also the original owner of WMER. As the weak signal and short transmitting tower in back of the music store barely covered Mercer County with neighboring Auglaize County being the fringe area, there was a demand for a more powerful station, hence WCSM AM and FM later emerged as a competitor in 1964 along with the former WERM located west of Wapakoneta at Moulton (which is now WFGF "The Frog" with studios in Lima.) The Fayette Street studios remain in use today.

The station changed ownership several different times during the 1970s; it was a sister station to WDRK in Greenville (now WTKD) from 1968 until 1972 under the ownership of Lee Rutherford and Ron Rumley airing Drake-Chenault's "Hitparade" adult contemporary automation tapes. Later in that same year, the station was later owned by the Hildebrand family (as WMER Incorporated) and played Top 40 music. Scott Hillebrand (air name: Scott Allen) managed the station and was chief DJ. Despite the owner's good intentions, it fell into receivership in 1973 (possibly due to financial problems coupled with its then-low power signal and limited coverage area), prompting a sale. A group of area business people formed a partnership called Grand Lake Broadcasting in an effort to purchase the station and tentatively move it to a newer building on State Route 703 near Grand Lake St. Marys and apply for a power increase with a more efficient tower but the deal fell through with the partnership quickly dissolved. By the spring of 1974 it was finally sold, with the new owners Keith and Jackie Balfour (previously with WCSM) flipping the format to adult standards. 1978 brought another ownership change, this time being Michigan-based Mid-America Radio Inc. with another format change (to country music), and a change in calls to WKKI. The "K-94" nickname was first used for the country format until 1979, which brought yet another format change, to a soft AC daytime/album oriented rock nighttime mix. In 1979 the station was finally upgraded to a much more powerful 3,000 watts and the transmitter moved to a higher tower near the West Ohio Branch Campus of Wright State University at Grand Lake St. Marys (which is also the transmitting tower of W17AA, the Celina translator of Dayton's public television station WPTD). The station switched to a full-time album-oriented rock format in 1983 by a new owner, Cage Media, headed up by Chris Cage, a former WING "Lively Guy" and University of Dayton graduate. The station was heavily involved with bringing concerts to the Ohio Theater in Lima. The format also gave the station opportunities to promote major concerts at other venues. Branded as "94-KKI", the AOR format lasted until early 1983 when the K-94 branding was revived and used, this time as the local affiliate of Transtar, one of the first satellite format programming services, again airing Adult Contemporary music. The K-94 branding remains today under its present owner with a mix of classic and contemporary rock and roll as its current format in addition to local high school sports coverage.

== Station ownership ==
- 1960–1968 – THE CELINA MUSIC STORE – owned no other radio stations
- 1968–1972 – RUTHERFORD AND RUMLEY ASSOCIATES – co-owned WDRK-FM Greenville
- 1972–1974 – WMER Inc.(owner Scott Hildebrand, later in receivership in 1973 to John Poppe)
- 1974–1978 - MERCER BROADCASTING (owner Keith and Jackie Balfour) – owned no other radio stations
- 1978–1984 – MID AMERICA BROADCASTING OF MICHIGAN – WTCM-AM / WTCM-FM Traverse City, WJIM-AM / WJIM-FM Lansing
- 1984–2004 - MERCER COUNTY COMMUNICATIONS – owned no other radio stations
- 2004–Present – SONSHINE BROADCASTING OF CELINA – owns no other radio stations

== Previous logo ==
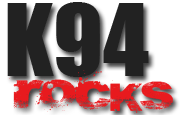
