= KUER-FM =

Public radio station in Salt Lake City

- Salt Lake City, Utah; United States
- Broadcast area: Wasatch Front
- Frequency: 90.1 MHz (HD Radio)
- Branding: KUER 90.1, NPR Utah

Programming
- Format: Public radio
- Subchannels: HD2: BBC World Service; HD3: Classical 24; HD4: Radio Bilingüe
- Affiliations: NPR

Ownership
- Owner: University of Utah
- Sister stations: Radio: KUUB; KUEU; KUHU; KUOU; KUQU; KUXU; TV: KUED; KUEN

History
- First air date: June 5, 1960; 66 years ago
- Call sign meaning: "Utah Education Radio"

Technical information
- Licensing authority: FCC
- Facility ID: 69171
- Class: C
- ERP: 21,000 watts
- HAAT: 1,244 meters (4,081 ft)
- Transmitter coordinates: 40°39′34.8″N 112°12′7.8″W
- Translator: See § Repeaters
- Repeater: See § Repeaters

Links
- Public license information: Public file; LMS
- Webcast: Listen live
- Website: kuer.org

KUER-FM (90.1 MHz) is a public radio station in Salt Lake City, Utah, United States. Owned by the University of Utah, its studios are located in the Eccles Broadcast Center on the University of Utah campus, while its main transmitter is located on Farnsworth Peak; an extensive transmitter network rebroadcasts its signal across Utah. KUER-FM features programming from NPR and other public radio distributors as well as local news coverage for Utah.

KUER-FM began broadcasting on June 5, 1960, as an educational station emphasizing classical music. It became a regional service in 1962 when its transmitter was moved to Mount Vision in the Oquirrh Mountains. After two financial crises that almost forced the station off the air, KUER evolved substantially in the 1970s and 1980s with the creation of NPR, a shift to a hybrid format of daytime classical and nighttime jazz music, each featuring long-tenured personalities. In 1993, it moved out of cramped quarters in historic Kingsbury Hall and into the new Eccles Broadcast Center.

Over the course of the 1990s, KUER-FM's program offerings came under threat from new competition: classical music listeners were defecting to KBYU-FM, while the new KCPW provided a challenge to KUER's NPR talk offerings. In response to falling ratings, classical music was removed from the schedule in 2001—triggering listener outcry but not a significant decline in donations. At the same time, the station created RadioWest, a local and regional news discussion program focusing on Utah and the Western United States. The remaining music, nightly jazz, was removed from KUER's lineup in 2015.

== History ==
=== Early history ===
The regents of the University of Utah (U of U) approved in November 1959 an application to the Federal Communications Commission (FCC) to establish an FM radio station on the campus. The FCC awarded the construction permit in January 1960.

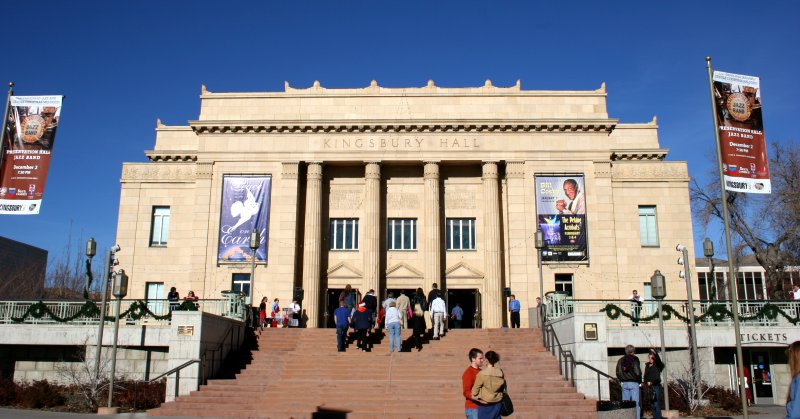
Kingsbury Hall housed KUER-FM's studios from 1960 to 1993 and its transmitter from 1960 to 1962.

On June 4, 1960, KUER-FM was authorized to begin program testing. It made its first broadcast the next day, June 5, consisting of a dedication program and the university's commencement ceremonies, simulcast with KUED. The studios in Kingsbury Hall had previously been used to run a carrier current station on the campus. In its initial period of operation, KUER broadcast for six hours a day, five days a week, with classical music and discussion programs as the primary programming. One regular feature was Chapter a Day, in which a chapter of a selected book was read each day; another was music instruction for students. The station made two large leaps in its early years: expanding to an 11-hour weekday program schedule and adding weekend broadcasts in April 1961 and relocating its transmitter from Kingsbury Hall to Mount Vision in the Oquirrh Mountains in 1962, improving reception in Salt Lake City and extending coverage along the Wasatch Front to Ogden and Provo. During this period, KUER was primarily run by students, though it was not targeted at the student audience. The lack of programming for this group led to a push to start a new carrier current outlet, "KUTE", aimed at campus interests. In 1968, The On Campus Show debuted, in part to serve as a vehicle for student action; it was the first such program in KUER's history.

During the late 1960s and early 1970s, KUER almost ran out of money twice after the station was removed from the university's uniform school fund. Beginning in the 1967–68 school year, the station was funded by the Intermountain Regional Medical Program, which used KUER to broadcast postgraduate courses in medicine to physicians, but this was supplanted by direct telephone lines to hospitals. The medical program continued to provide $5,000 annually in support to the station through 1972, when it ceased providing money, raising the possibility of the station being shuttered. The station survived with funding from the Associated Students of the University of Utah and, beginning in the 1972–73 school year, became entirely student-operated, with some 70 volunteers and—for the first time—opportunity to earn course credits for working at KUER.

=== Going public and going statewide ===
In May 1971, KUER joined the new National Public Radio network and began carrying its first program, All Things Considered. It became a seven-day-a-week operation with Saturday programming beginning in 1972 and began broadcasting at higher power and in stereo in 1974. A 24-hour programming schedule followed in 1984.

During the leadership tenure of Don Smith, KUER's first paid employee (in 1962) and station manager between 1975 and 1985, the station adopted a format of daytime classical music, early evening news and information, and nighttime jazz, responding to research into public radio audiences. The classical and jazz sections each had tenured on-air personalities associated with them. Gene Pack started with KUER when it began in June 1960 and remained for 42 years, spending almost all of that time hosting classical music programming. In 1988, Wes Bowen left KSL to join KUER, where he hosted the nightly Just Jazz; the program remained on air into the 2000s. Another jazz program was hosted by Steve Williams from 1984 to 2015; upon his retirement, Scott Pierce of The Salt Lake Tribune hailed Williams as "the pre-eminent local authority on jazz".

In 1982, the station ceased reporting local news in response to NPR budget cuts. This changed four years later when KUER revived a news department, initially using students to gather news. By 1991, student involvement in newsgathering had been reduced again to nothing with the scrapping of a weekly public affairs program, Sunday Journal. In spite of this, many people believed KUER was a student station in its news department.

KUER began laying the groundwork in the late 1970s for a statewide expansion of its programming. In October 1979, it filed for 14 different translators to rebroadcast into communities from Vernal to Washington. The translator network began to roll out in late 1982; there were 19 translators by 1988 and 28 by 1993.

=== New studios and new competition ===
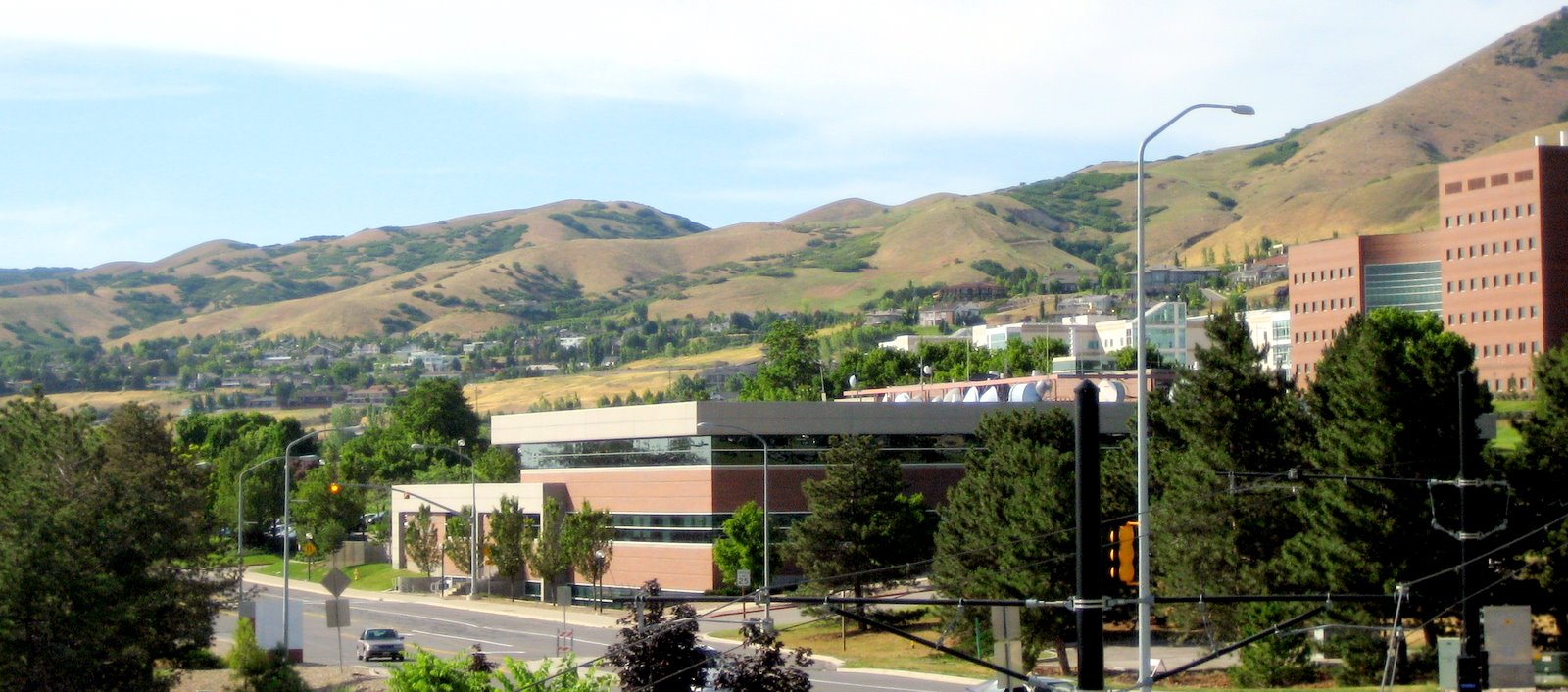
KUER-FM moved to the Eccles Broadcast Center in 1993.

During the 1980s, the University of Utah's broadcasting operations were outgrowing their cramped quarters. KUED, which was located separately in the Music Hall, sought new studios as early as 1981, and KUER was similarly facing a lack of space in Kingsbury Hall. After a $5 million gift by Dolores Doré Eccles, ground was broken on the Eccles Broadcast Center in 1989. KUED, KUER-FM, and KULC (channel 9) began broadcasting from the site in 1993.

In November 1992, KUER-FM gained competition for public radio talk listeners in the Salt Lake area. A new station, KCPW (88.3 FM)—an outgrowth of KPCW in Park City—signed on the air, offering what founder Blair Feulner called an "intelligent, all-information format" including such NPR shows as Talk of the Nation and Fresh Air as well as the BBC World Service overnights. Though Feulner disclaimed any competition with KUER-FM, KCPW was seen as a competitor to KUER and, in the late 1990s, began to chip away at KUER's listenership. Meanwhile, classical music listeners were slowly switching to the all-classical music station from Brigham Young University, KBYU-FM. In response, Greene proposed a reduction in classical programming, which met with opposition from some listeners. Later that year, KUER reduced its classical programming by an hour on afternoons and added The World in its place.

The response to proposed classical cuts, as well as the loss of listeners to KCPW for information and KBYU for classical music, informed Greene's decision to move quickly three years later. On March 16, 2001, with little notice, Greene discontinued KUER's daytime classical programming and replaced it with additional NPR talk shows. Greene justified the decision as a bid to shore up continuing listener erosion as classical listeners switched to KBYU and as providing a more distinctive service statewide. KCPW also protested the change, calling it "predatory" and fearing that duplication among the two stations—of six syndicated programs on weekdays—would harm it financially. The format change resulted in a sharp outcry from listeners and a dip in daytime listening figures, reaching as far as protests with the state Information Technology Commission. It did not dent listener contributions for the fiscal year, even though it was more than halfway complete at the time of the switch. In the first fund drive after the switch, donations reached a record high, in part driven by high demand for news in the wake of the September 11 attacks. Pack remained with KUER, producing an arts calendar and engaging in other behind-the-scenes work, before retiring the next year. In 2006, KUER began broadcasting in HD Radio, and the next year, it began multicasting, including a classical music subchannel.

=== Switch to all-talk and second station acquisition ===
In 2015, Steve Williams retired, ending his 31-year tenure with KUER. Concurrently, nighttime jazz programming was dropped and replaced with additional talk programming. It was Greene's last major move as the leader of KUER; he retired in 2017 after a 28-year tenure and was replaced with Maria O'Mara, a former KUER reporter and journalist who had been the communications director for the University of Utah. Leadership of KUER and KUED was combined in 2020 when KUED's general manager, James Morgese, retired.

KUER acquired the license and facility of KCPW in 2023, after that station put itself up for auction for financial reasons. KUER began broadcasting Spanish-language Radio Bilingüe—which had already been airing on an HD subchannel—on the frequency, while Utah Public Radio absorbed KCPW's programming. KCPW's call sign was changed to KUUB.

== Funding ==
In fiscal year 2023, KUER-FM had total revenue of $5,997,000. The Corporation for Public Broadcasting contributed a $463,000 Community Service Grant, and the University of Utah contributed $542,000 in funding. The station received $2,018,000 in donations and $1,129,643 in underwriting revenues and had 13,001 members in 2023. A total of 436 major individual donors donated $737,000 in gifts and bequests.

== Programming ==
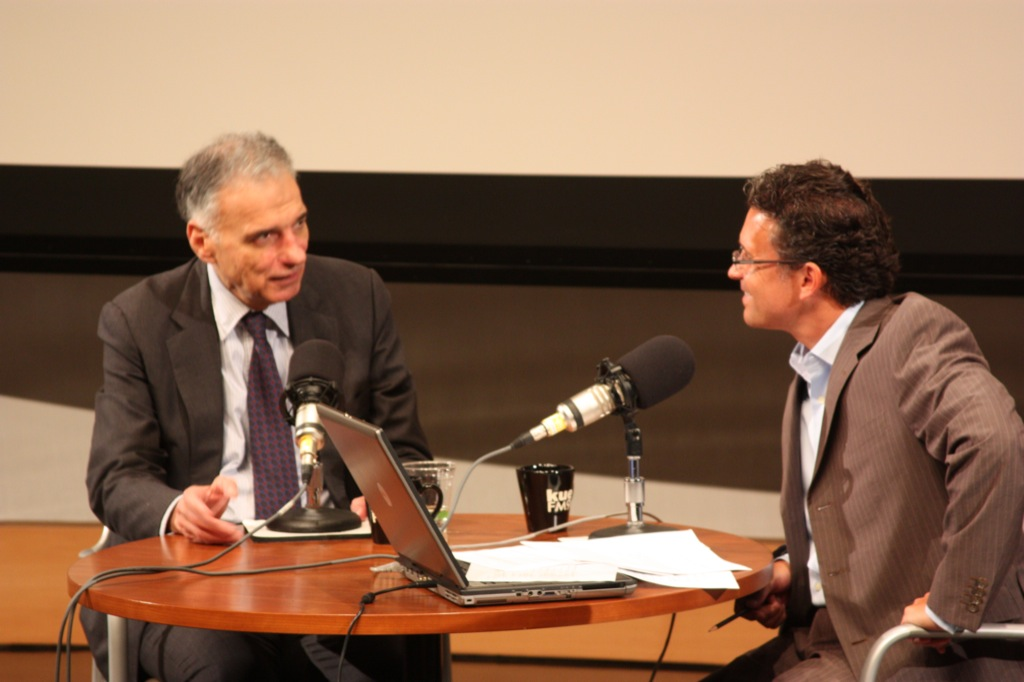
Doug Fabrizio interviews Ralph Nader in 2008

KUER's programming during the week consists of public radio talk programs from NPR and other distributors, including Morning Edition, Fresh Air, The World, Marketplace, and All Things Considered. A variety of specialty programs are aired on weekends.

Airing two days a week (Wednesday and Thursday) is RadioWest, a newsmagazine focusing on issues of Utah and the West hosted by Doug Fabrizio. RadioWest debuted on February 1, 2000, initially as a twice-weekly program with reports from KUER and other public radio stations in the western United States, emphasizing longform and narrative features. In May 2001, RadioWest became KUER's first daily local news program, shifting to an hour in a midday timeslot and adding call-in segments. It continued airing at 11 a.m. until 2017, when Diane Rehm retired. The show was moved to an earlier time after Morning Edition, which exacerbated Fabrizio's workload and made it harder to attract guests. In 2019, RadioWest went on hiatus and returned as a weekly program.

== Repeaters ==
KUER-FM is rebroadcast by five full-power FM stations as well as 33 boosters (filling in within the immediate area of the KUER-FM transmitter) and translators throughout Utah.

High-power repeaters of KUER-FM
Call sign	Frequency	City of license	FID	Class	ERP (W)	HAAT	Transmitter coordinates
KUQU	93.9 FM	Enoch	170181	C	30,000	824 m (2,703 ft)	37°32′29″N 113°4′7″W
KUEU	90.5 FM	Logan	89301	A	1,500	142 m (466 ft)	41°36′40.7″N 111°57′8.8″W
KUXU	88.3 FM	Monroe	173050	C1	2,500	973 m (3,192 ft)	38°23′7.9″N 112°19′59.7″W
KUHU	88.1 FM	Monticello	172928	C2	252	1,070 m (3,510 ft)	37°50′24.9″N 109°27′42.4″W
KUOU	89.3 FM	Roosevelt	173223	C2	2,500	524 m (1,719 ft)	40°32′15.8″N 109°41′59.5″W

Two repeaters have histories prior to rebroadcasting KUER-FM. KUEU in Logan went on the air in 2007 as KZCL, repeating Salt Lake City community radio station KRCL to northern Utah. The facility, which had been planned for more than a decade, struggled with engineering issues and the ability to receive a reliable signal of KRCL. It was sold to the U of U in 2011 and became KUEU, rebroadcasting KUER-FM; one local booster of the rebroadcast effort apologized in a letter to the editor for representing KRCL. KUQU, licensed to Enoch and covering St. George and Cedar City, was originally KYLZ, licensed to Parowan. It was silent when the U of U acquired it in 2016 along with its construction permit for the new city of license.

In 2025, the University of Utah agreed to buy KAGJ in Ephraim from Snow College for $15,000; a provision in the sale allows the university to take possession of and remove the studio equipment from the college campus, and the university reserved the call sign KUCU for use when it takes over. Snow's elimination of KAGJ and its media studies program were part of its proposal to the Utah Board of Higher Education to carry out a state-mandated 10% budget cut for courses and programs seen as inefficient or underperforming and reallocation into programs deemed more relevant.

Boosters of KUER-FM
Call sign	Frequency	City of license	FID	ERP (W)	HAAT
KUER-FM1	90.1 FM	Alta	124934	10	139 m (456 ft)
KUER-FM2	90.1 FM	Park City	170892	1,000	802 m (2,631 ft)

Translators of KUER-FM
Call sign	Frequency	City of license	FID
K211DH	90.1 FM	Annabella	87430
K211CL	90.1 FM	Beaver	76876
K202AW	88.3 FM	Cedar City	69147
K201BY	88.1 FM	Delta, etc.	69344
K211CK	90.1 FM	Fillmore	76878
K218EM	91.5 FM	Heber City	69392
K209BG	89.7 FM	Huntsville	69095
K211BB	90.1 FM	Kanab	69370
K213AA	90.5 FM	Laketown & Garden City	69364
K211CQ	90.1 FM	Manila & Dutch John	69130
K283BS	104.5 FM	Manti, etc.	69105
K203CA	88.5 FM	Milford	76881
K280BT	103.9 FM	Milford, etc.	69065
K219KR	91.7 FM	Moab	69208
K269BP	101.7 FM	Monroe, etc.	69310
K214EG	90.7 FM	Monticello	69197
K215EL	90.9 FM	North Moab	69029
K264BK	100.7 FM	Orderville, etc.	38352
K202AD	88.3 FM	Orangeville, etc.	69162
K208AG	89.5 FM	Park City	68998
K211BU	90.1 FM	Parowan	69377
K205FK	88.9 FM	Price	69236
K202AF	88.3 FM	Randolph, etc.	69289
K213EE	90.5 FM	Rural Emery County	79105
K272EG	102.3 FM	Rural San Juan County	156498
K203AB	88.5 FM	Rural Summit County	69255
K285BK	104.9 FM	Tabiona, etc.	68990
K201CF	88.1 FM	Ticaboo	69087
K216AC	91.1 FM	Tropic, etc.	69305
K211CV	90.1 FM	Vernal, etc.	69272
K300AC	107.9 FM	Washington, etc.	69275

A translator in Pocatello, Idaho, was donated by the University of Utah to Boise State Public Radio in 2022, with the U of U citing difficulty in maintaining a reliable signal from Salt Lake City.
