= KUBO =

- Calexico, California; United States
- Broadcast area: Calexico, California; Mexicali, Baja California
- Frequency: 88.7 MHz

Programming
- Format: Variety

Ownership
- Owner: Radio Bilingüe, Inc.

Technical information
- Licensing authority: FCC
- Facility ID: 54495
- Class: A
- ERP: 3,000 watts
- HAAT: 83 meters (272 ft)
- Transmitter coordinates: 32°47′57″N 115°30′12″W
- Translator: 92.7 K224EV (Ligurta, Arizona)

Links
- Public license information: Public file; LMS
- Website: radiobilingue.org

KUBO (88.7 FM) is a community radio station licensed to Calexico, California, United States, and broadcasting a Variety format. The station is currently owned by Radio Bilingüe, Inc. with programs in the English and Spanish languages.
