= Vision Maker Media =

Vision Maker Media, formerly Native American Public Broadcasting Consortium and Native American Public Telecommunications, is a non-profit organization based in Lincoln, Nebraska. Its main activity is producing video programs, however it also operated a former audio distribution system called AIROS. In 2013, Indian Country Today described the organization as "a highly regarded source for informative Native American and Pacific Islander educational and home videos".

Native American Public Broadcasting Consortium (NAPBC) was the original name of the organization. A group of Native American video producers in public television founded it in 1976. In a few years, the organization received funding from the Corporation for Public Broadcasting and several public television stations in the United States.

Native American Public Telecommunications (NAPT) was the name the organization adopted after adding transmission of audio to its activities. As early as 1984, it was exploring expanding to include transmitting media via satellite. In that year, it conducted a feasibility study called “Smoke Signals to Satellite”. From 1994 to 2006, it distributed radio programming from producers to radio stations via satellite, branding the service American Indian Radio on Satellite (AIROS). The organization adopted the NAPT name in 1995, shortly after AIROS went into operation.

Vision Maker Media was the name the organization adopted as it shifted its focus back to video. The organization continued to produce video programming during the AIROS period. For a time it branded its video activities AIROS Video, but by 2001 was using the brand Visionmaker. In January 2013, the organization changed its name to Vision Maker Media.
