= KUUB =

Public radio station in Salt Lake City

- Salt Lake City, Utah; United States
- Frequency: 88.3 MHz
- Branding: Avanza 88.3

Programming
- Language: Spanish
- Format: Public radio
- Network: Radio Bilingüe

Ownership
- Owner: University of Utah

History
- First air date: November 1, 1992
- Former call signs: KBQA (1991–1992, CP); KCPW (1992–2004); KCPW-FM (2004–2024)

Technical information
- Licensing authority: FCC
- Facility ID: 13481
- Class: C3
- ERP: 3,300 watts
- HAAT: 421 meters (1,381 ft)
- Transmitter coordinates: 40°37′53″N 112°7′53″W

Links
- Public license information: Public file; LMS
- Website: avanzautah.org

KUUB (88.3 MHz), known as Avanza 88.3, is a public radio station in Salt Lake City, Utah, United States, airing Spanish-language radio programming from Radio Bilingüe. It is owned by the University of Utah and originates from the Eccles Broadcast Center on its campus, with a transmitter in the Oquirrh Mountains southwest of West Valley City.

From 1992 to 2024, the 88.3 frequency in Salt Lake City was KCPW, a public radio station founded by Community Wireless of Park City, owner of KPCW in Park City. KCPW served as a second NPR station for the Salt Lake City area, sharing some programs with KPCW and partially overlapping in programming with the University of Utah's KUER-FM. In the late 1990s, this programming helped erode listenership at KUER, which responded in 2001 by dropping its classical music programming. For a time in the 2000s, it was simulcast on 1010 kHz to increase its coverage area.

In 2008, Wasatch Public Media was formed to buy KCPW from Community Wireless. To do so, it incurred substantial debt that dominated its finances for nearly a decade. During this time, KCPW let go of NPR programming in 2013 to save money, and it narrowly avoided losing American Public Media–produced shows in 2014. The debt was refinanced in 2017, but lingering financial issues and the impact of the COVID-19 pandemic led Wasatch Public Media to put the license up for auction in 2023. The University of Utah bought the station to air Radio Bilingüe programming, and KCPW ceased its format on October 31, 2023; three of its local programs continued under the auspices of Utah Public Radio.

== KCPW ==
=== Construction and early years ===
In 1988, KBYU-FM moved from 88.9 to 89.1 MHz, opening the door for a new station on a lower frequency in the area. On June 24, 1991, Community Wireless of Park City, Inc., the owner of that city's KPCW, received a construction permit to build a new non-commercial FM station in Salt Lake City from the Federal Communications Commission (FCC).

KCPW made a quiet debut on November 1, 1992, broadcasting its signal from the top of the University Park Hotel and Suites in Salt Lake City and sharing a studio with KPCW in Park City. It shared its morning programming with KPCW before airing nine hours of NPR news and talk programming, switching at night to classical music and the BBC World Service. While naming the offshoot of KPCW KCPW was seen as clever, it would later be cited as a source of confusion by listeners, who regularly confused the two stations.

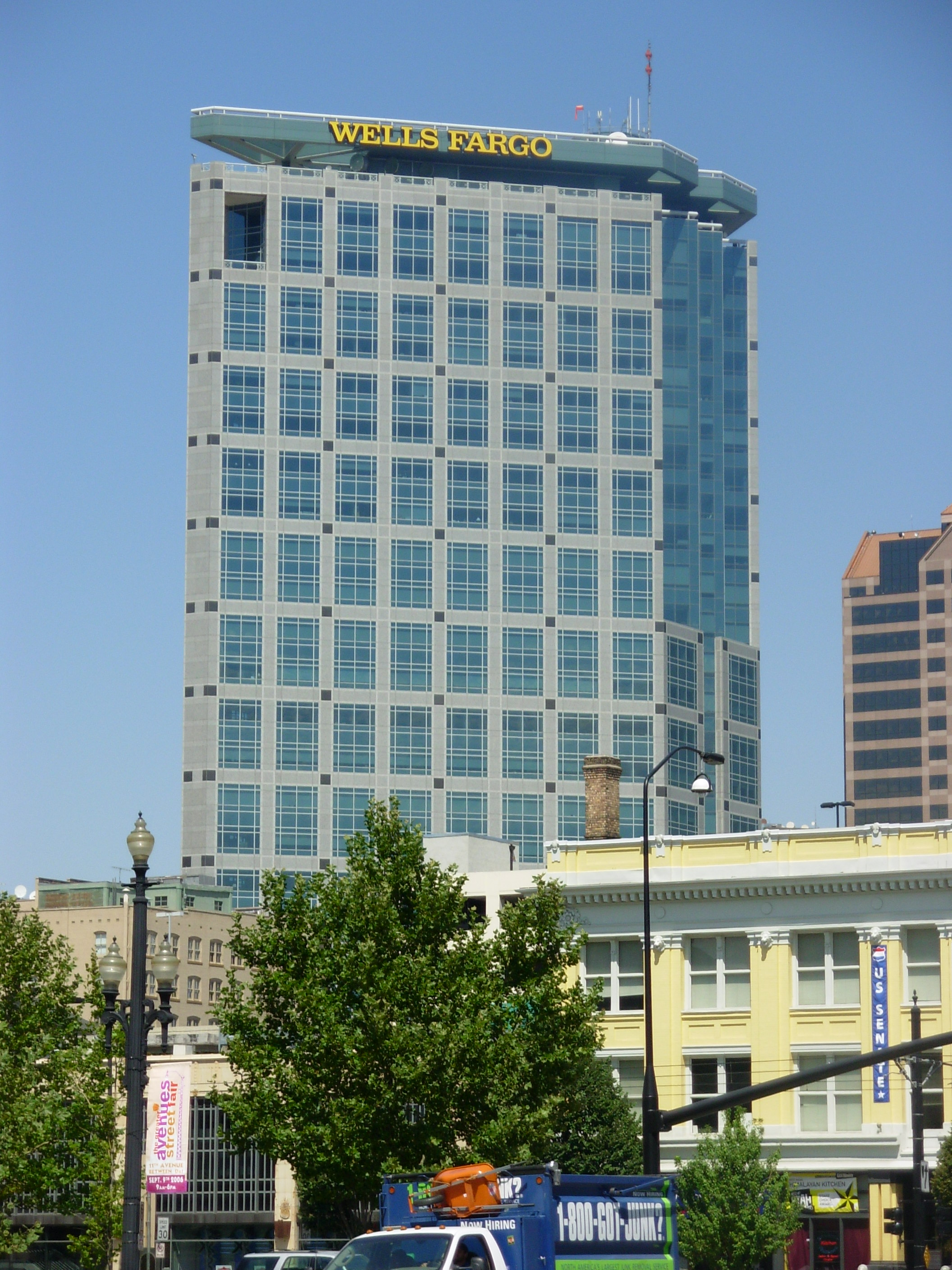
The red antennas on the right side of the Wells Fargo Center broadcast KCPW-FM from 2000 to 2017.

Slowly, KCPW gathered an audience. By 1999, it had one-third the listenership of the University of Utah (U of U)'s KUER-FM, which had come to be seen as its rival even though Community Wireless leader Blair Feulner disclaimed any competition with KUER-FM. In 2000, the transmitter moved from the University Park to the American Stores Tower (later the Wells Fargo Center), part of a major power increase for KCPW. As KCPW and classical music station KBYU-FM eroded KUER-FM's listenership, that station took action. In March 2001, it dropped its daytime classical music programming to add a series of new NPR talk shows, many of which had previously been heard in Salt Lake City on KCPW. Greene justified the decision as a bid to shore up continuing listener erosion as classical listeners switched to KBYU and as providing a more distinctive service statewide. KCPW also protested the change, calling it "predatory" and fearing that duplication among the two stations—of six syndicated programs on weekdays—would harm it financially. The University of Utah moved to shift broadcasts originating from its Hinckley Institute of Politics from KCPW to KUER-FM under its new, more compatible format. When KUER came into direct competition with KCPW, it was able to tap university and state support, as well as its statewide translator network, to sustain itself, putting KCPW at a disadvantage.

In 2004, KCPW moved its studios from trailers at Westminster College to Library Square at the Salt Lake City Public Library, part of an effort to give the station a higher profile and distinguish it from KUER-FM. The Library Square studios, which featured large street-level windows allowing passers-by to see live broadcasts, were one of several moves the station made during the short management tenure of Vicki Mann, who oversaw the acquisition of AM station KIQN (1010 AM) to add coverage of Northern Utah and expanded the staff to eight people in her year running KCPW. The $2.5 million AM station purchase was funded by a bond, to be repaid by the station at $200,000 a year for 25 years, demanding increased fundraising.

=== Wasatch Public Media ownership ===
Community Wireless of Park City was losing substantial amounts of money by the mid-2000s, largely due to the acquisition of KCPW AM, (Note: In 2008, a deal was reached with Immaculate Heart Radio to sell KCPW AM, which fell apart before being renegotiated at a lower price in 2009.) with losses exceeding $600,000 in 2005 and $413,000 in 2006. At the same time, Feulner's compensation of $150,000 a year exceeded the average of similarly sized nonprofits and other public radio stations. In February 2008, Community Wireless announced its intention to sell KCPW-FM and focus on KPCW in Park City, claiming KCPW deserved management based in Salt Lake City. It gave Ed Sweeney, the station manager, 45 days to form a new non-profit to acquire KCPW.

The new group, known as Wasatch Public Media, had its bid accepted on March 28 but struggled to raise cash; were it to fail, the Educational Media Foundation had already expressed interest in acquiring KCPW. It succeeded with an agreement with the National Cooperative Bank (NCB), which—just one day before the deadline—lent Wasatch $2.2 million to support the acquisition.

The NCB deal was poorly timed, coming months before the Great Recession. By 2011, NCB was seeking to exit its public radio financing deal, and donors had pledged a total of $236,000 that never came. Wasatch Public Media struggled to find new lending support that would help it reduce its loan burden, even though its finances had improved and its listenership increased. In 2011, the station needed funds to enable a restructuring of the NCB loan; the city of Salt Lake City almost lent the station money, which mayor Ralph Becker blocked. KCPW-FM ended its longtime National Public Radio (NPR) membership on June 24, 2013, allowing the station to reduce expenses as well as decrease duplication with the area's primary NPR network affiliate, 90.1 KUER-FM. KCPW-FM continued to carry national programming supplied by Public Radio International, American Public Media, the Canadian Broadcasting Corporation and the BBC. The station also continued to produce its local programming. In June 2014, the station announced that it would need to raise $42,000 by July 3 in order to pay for its American Public Media programming; if the goal was not met, KCPW-FM would have closed down, with the money donated during the fund drive returned to the contributors. The goal was reached on July 2, 2014. In 2017, the original 2008 loan from NCB was restructured, reducing the station's long-term debt by $1.7 million, with new senior lenders replacing the bank. That same year, the station's transmitter moved up to the Oquirrh Mountains, which protected coverage previously provided by a translator at risk of being forced off the air.

=== KUUB ===
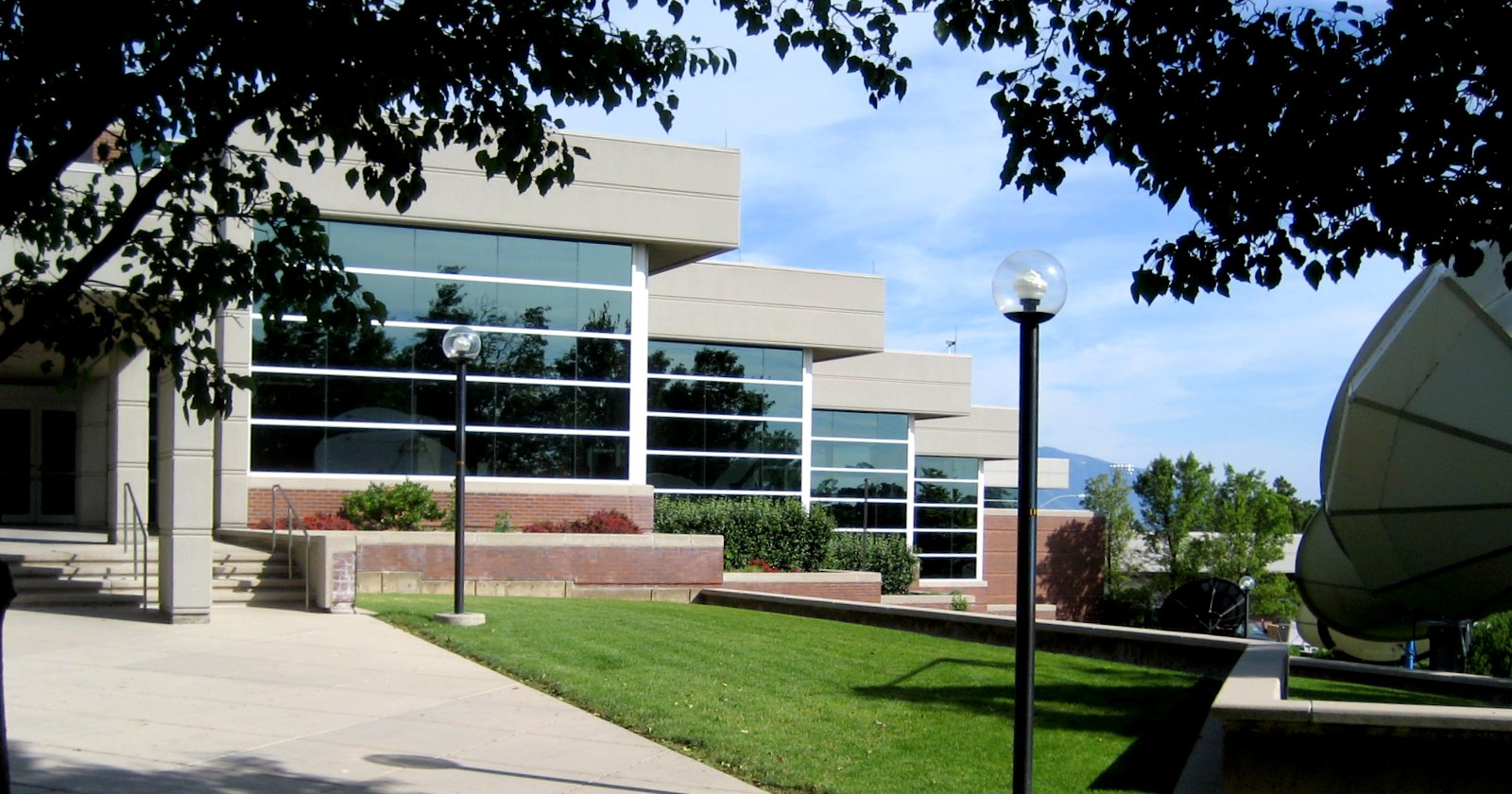
The Eccles Broadcast Center on the University of Utah campus

In September 2023, KCPW-FM was offered for sale by a media brokerage, with a minimum bid of $350,000. The brokerage listing preceded a formal announcement from Wasatch Public Media, which ascribed the decision to "the initial purchase price of the station, the recession that followed, and a global pandemic and its aftereffects". The auction was later called off ahead of the University of Utah agreeing to buy KCPW for $450,000. The transaction did not include the Library Square studio facility. On October 31, KCPW ceased broadcasting after exactly 31 years on the air in Salt Lake City; the local programming aired by the station—Beyond the Headlines, Both Sides of the Aisle, and Jazz Time with Steve Williams—continued with Utah Public Radio.

KUER had already been broadcasting the Spanish-language Radio Bilingüe, which provides talk programming and blocks of Latin and indigenous music, as an HD Radio subchannel since May 2023; KUER and PBS Utah executive director Maria O'Mara noted that it opted to use the new frequency to air Radio Bilingüe and attract a "more diverse and younger audience". KCPW-FM's call sign was changed to KUUB, and the station's first program director was named in May 2024. The station took the name Avanza 88.3 in September after a listener vote; the station's full format is planned to launch in March 2025.
