= Lakefield Airport =

Public use airport in Celina, Ohio

- IATA: none; ICAO: KCQA; FAA LID: CQA

Summary
- Owner: Lakefield Airport Authority
- Operator: Miller Aviation
- Serves: Celina, Ohio
- Location: Mercer County, Ohio, United States
- Time zone: UTC−05:00 (-5)
  - Summer (DST): UTC−04:00 (-4)
- Elevation AMSL: 894 ft (272 m)
- Coordinates: 40°29′03″N 084°33′32″W

Map
- Location within Ohio Location within the United States

Runways
Direction	Length		Surface
Direction	ft	m	Surface
8/26	4,400	1,341	Asphalt

Statistics (2023)
- Aircraft operations: 12,045
- Source: Federal Aviation Administration

Lakefield Airport (ICAO: KCQA, FAA LID: CQA) (Note: The airport formerly used the FAA location identifier 7G9.) is a publicly owned, public use airport located four miles south of Celina, Ohio, United States. The airport sits on 122 acres at an elevation of 894 feet.

== History ==
Two World War II veterans, Richard Iehle and Robert Helfrich, purchased the 47-acre (19 ha) field in December 1947 with plans to operate it as a flight school. Following the airport's purchase earlier that month, a livestock exchange was established there in May 1953.

A fundraising drive in 1961 enabled the purchase of the airport for the county. New lights and radios were purchased for the airport in March 1963. A contract for construction of four hangars was awarded four months later. Construction of a 3,200-foot (980 m) grass runway began in September 1964. A contract to pave the 3,800-foot (1,200 m) runway was awarded in June 1966. The airport was dedicated on 17 August 1966. An 896-square-foot (83.2 m^{2}) addition to the shop hangar was authorized in 1969.

Construction of a parallel grass runway was approved in July 1979. The airport was closed for three months in 1982–1983.

The removal of trees in a nearby cemetery that would be obstructions to a planned expansion caused complaints from residents in 1990.

The airport announced a two-phase plan to extend the runway to 4,900 feet (1,500 m) in December 1998.

The Lakefield Airport Authority received a $135,000 grant from the Federal Aviation Administration in 2022 to purchase extra land for development. The airport received an additional $95,000 grant in 2023 to conduct an airport drainage study.

== Facilities and aircraft ==
The airport has one runway. It is designated as runway 8/26 and measures 4400 x 75 ft (1341 x 23 m) and is paved with asphalt.

Based on the 12-month period ending August 24, 2023, the airport has 12,045 airport operations per year, an average of 33 per day. It was 99% general aviation and 1% air taxi. For the same time period, 20 aircraft were based at the airport, all single-engine airplanes.

The airport has a fixed-base operator that sells both avgas and Jet A fuel.

== Accidents and incidents ==
- On 24 June 1983, a Piper Aerostar crashed while preparing to land at the airport, killing the pilot.
- On 18 September 1988, an Enstrom F-28A was destroyed in a crash at the airport.
- On May 9, 1999, a Cessna 205 made a forced landing after takeoff from Lakefield Airport. Witnesses described the engine initially sounded smooth and uninterrupted but then briefly sputtered and completely shut off. They also said the aircraft looked low and was struggling to climb, and one person said the plane entered a flat spin. The probable cause of the accident was found to be the pilot's failure to refuel the airplane, which resulted in fuel exhaustion and a loss of engine power. Also causal to the accident was the pilot's failure to maintain aircraft control after the power loss.
- On July 9, 2020, a storm destroyed a hangar and a Cessna 150 at the airport.
- On May 27, 2021, a Grumman-Schweizer G-164B crashed while operating near the airport. Shortly after takeoff, the engine lost thrust, but the engine indicators continued to show full power. The pilot established best glide speed and entered a slight bank to avoid trees. Though the pilot jettisoned his chemical load in an attempt to maintain altitude, but the aircraft touched down in a waterway. The airplane landed inverted, and the pilot was able to escape.

== See also ==
- List of airports in Ohio
