= Celina City School District =

School district in Ohio

Address
- 585 E Livingston St Celina, Ohio, 45822; United States

District information
- Grades: Pre-school - 12
- Superintendent: Dr. Ken Schmiesing
- NCES District ID: 3910030

Students and staff
- Enrollment: 2,859 (2020-2021)
- Student–teacher ratio: 15.60

Other information
- Telephone: (419) 586-8300
- Fax: (419) 586-7046
- Website: www.celinaschools.org

The Celina City School District is a public school district in Mercer County, Ohio, United States, based in Celina, Ohio.

== Schools ==
The Celina City School District has two elementary schools, one intermediate school, one middle school, and one high school.

=== Elementary schools ===
- Celina Elementary School
- Celina Primary School

=== Middle school ===
- Celina Middle School

=== Intermediate school ===
- Celina Intermediate School

=== High school ===
- Celina High School
