= KTQX =

Radio Bilingue radio station in Bakersfield, California

- Bakersfield, California; United States
- Frequency: 90.1 MHz

Programming
- Format: Spanish-language public radio - Latin music

Ownership
- Owner: Radio Bilingüe, Inc.

History
- First air date: April 14, 1989; 36 years ago

Technical information
- Licensing authority: FCC
- Facility ID: 54494
- Class: B
- ERP: 570 watts
- HAAT: 1,104 meters (3,622 ft)
- Transmitter coordinates: 35°27′11″N 118°35′25″W
- Translators: 99.5 K258CK (Barstow); 100.7 K264BQ (Palmdale) (107.9 MHz) K300DX (Palmdale)

Links
- Public license information: Public file; LMS
- Website: radiobilingue.org

KTQX (90.1 FM) is a non-commercial radio station licensed to Bakersfield, California, owned by Radio Bilingüe, Inc. It airs a Spanish-language public radio format including news, talk and Latin music.

== See also ==
- List of community radio stations in the United States
