= KBBF =

Radio station in Calistoga, California

- Calistoga, California; United States
- Broadcast area: North Bay
- Frequency: 89.1 MHz
- Branding: La Voz de tu Comunidad

Programming
- Languages: Spanish; English
- Format: Community radio
- Affiliations: Radio Bilingüe; Pacifica Radio Network

Ownership
- Owner: Bilingual Broadcasting Foundation, Inc.

History
- First air date: 1973
- Call sign meaning: Bilingual Broadcasting Foundation

Technical information
- Licensing authority: FCC
- Facility ID: 5310
- Class: B
- ERP: 420 watts
- HAAT: 843.6 meters
- Transmitter coordinates: 38°39′23″N 122°36′54″W

Links
- Public license information: Public file; LMS
- Website: kbbf.org

KBBF (89.1 FM) is a non-commercial community radio station licensed to Calistoga, California, with studios in Santa Rosa, California. It is owned and operated by the Bilingual Broadcasting Foundation Inc. (BBFI).

== History ==
The Bilingual Broadcasting Foundation, Inc. (BBFI) was created in August 1971 by several Sonoma State University students and community leaders with the specific purpose of operating an educational radio station that would perform public services. It received funding and support from the Robert F. Kennedy Memorial Foundation. The station was deeded property at 4010 Finley Ave in Santa Rosa on land that was part of a decommissioned naval auxiliary air station. Offices and studios were built on the site and a transmitter and antenna were installed atop Mount Saint Helena, located at the intersection of Sonoma, Napa and Lake counties about 15 miles N-NE of Santa Rosa, California. The station went on the air on May 31, 1973.

Throughout its history, KBBF has been a mostly-volunteer organization concentrating on supporting the local Latino population. However, in 2008 the station hit a low point in its long and storied history when its general manager was discovered to have a felony drug conviction and the station lost its Public Service Grant from the Corporation for Public Broadcasting. In 2010, lightning struck the transmitter site causing severe damage and in 2011 the city of Santa Rosa slapped a $56,000 lien against the station's Finley Avenue property for repeated failures to resolve code issues. In 2008, a group of concerned community members called "Voces Cruzando Fronteras" sued BBFI, which resulted in a court order forcing new elections to the board of directors.

== See also ==
- List of community radio stations in the United States
