= KUCU =

Radio station in Ephraim, Utah, U.S.

Repeater of KUER-FM Salt Lake City
- Ephraim, Utah; United States
- Frequency: 88.9 MHz

Programming
- Format: Public radio, news/talk

Ownership
- Owner: University of Utah

History
- First air date: April 4, 1994
- Former call signs: KAGF (1993–1994, not used on air); KAGJ (1994–2025)
- Former frequencies: 89.5 MHz (1994–2011)

Technical information
- Licensing authority: FCC
- Facility ID: 60705
- Class: C3
- ERP: 380 watts
- HAAT: 708 meters (2,323 ft)
- Transmitter coordinates: 39°19′17.8″N 111°36′13.7″W

Links
- Public license information: Public file; LMS
- Website: kuer.org

KUCU (88.9 FM) is a radio station licensed to Ephraim, Utah, United States. It is owned by the University of Utah, owner of KUER-FM in Salt Lake City.

This facility has operated since 1994 and was the third different radio station license held by Snow College. Snow College operated small campus radio stations in the 1950s and 1970s, both times using the call sign KEPH. On a new license, Snow College resumed radio broadcasts in 1994 as KAGJ, calling its station The Kage. The station was shut down in 2025 upon its faculty advisor's retirement and a state mandate to reallocate funding to more relevant courses, with the license and facilities sold to the University of Utah.

== History ==
=== Prior radio stations at Snow College ===
The original KEPH began broadcasting from Snow College on May 16, 1951. It was the first FM radio station at a college in Utah. Programming was limited; for instance, in October 1951 it was operating three hours a day during the week, and in September 1952 it operated for just three hours a night. KEPH operated as late as 1958; in February 1959, the Federal Communications Commission (FCC) deleted the license at the station's request.

Beginning in 1959, a carrier current AM station, known as KSNO, operated on the campus. In 1970, Snow College began its return to radio by applying for a new FM license, which began broadcasting about April 21, 1971, as KEPH on 89.5 MHz. As before, it broadcast with 10 watts, superseding the prior carrier current operation. The station, located in the Art Barn, was broadcasting 15 hours each weekday by 1974. By the late 1970s, its importance had declined such that it was not brought on the air for the 1977–78 school year until April, with student and administrative support, and even then on a seven-hour weekday schedule. The station lacked educational programming; in response to FCC directives, college administration was forced to add this programming and reduce the number of advertisements for on-campus events. The station closed that year.

=== KAGJ, "The Kage" ===
After obtaining a new construction permit in August 1993, Snow College again began broadcasting a radio station, this time as KAGJ "The Kage", on April 4, 1994. The station aired Top 40 music with specialty programs and broadcast around the clock on weekdays. A new antenna was erected on the Communications Building to broadcast the service; the structure was demolished in 1998 and the station moved to the basement of Varsity House. For the first time in its history, it broadcast through the summer in 2000 after the installation of automation equipment enabling KAGJ to run jockless. This coincided with a move within Varsity House. Beginning in 2001, a $1-per-semester activity fee was assessed to students to raise money for operations. Some 60 to 80 students a semester were involved in its operation, and the station was computerized so it could broadcast over the summer.

KAGJ moved from 89.5 to 88.9 MHz in 2011. It also moved to its present transmitter site on Barton Mountain, which was necessary due to the demolition of Fern Young Hall, where its tower was located. Commercial radio station group Mid-Utah Radio provided the tower site. The station began live streaming its content in the summer of 2019.

=== University of Utah ownership ===
After 33 years at Snow College, faculty advisor Gary Chidester retired in 2025. The college then agreed to sell the station to the University of Utah, owner of KUER-FM in Salt Lake City, for $15,000; a provision in the sale allows the university to take possession of and remove the studio equipment from the college campus, and the university reserved the call sign KUCU for use when it takes over. Snow's elimination of KAGJ and its media studies program were part of its proposal to the Utah Board of Higher Education to carry out a state-mandated 10% budget cut for courses and programs seen as inefficient or underperforming and reallocation into programs deemed more relevant. The sale was consummated on November 19, 2025, and the call sign changed the next day.

== See also ==
- Campus radio
- List of college radio stations in the United States
