= WCSM (AM) =

Radio station in Celina, Ohio

- Celina, Ohio; United States
- Frequency: 1350 kHz
- Branding: Lake 100.3

Programming
- Format: Country

Ownership
- Owner: Brent and Danielle Selhorst; (Buzzards Media, LLC)
- Sister stations: WCSM-FM

History
- First air date: September 11, 1965
- Call sign meaning: Celina, St. Marys

Technical information
- Licensing authority: FCC
- Facility ID: 26470
- Class: D
- Power: 500 watts (day); 11 watts (night)
- Transmitter coordinates: 40°32′14″N 84°35′18″W
- Translator: 100.3 W262DC (Celina)

Links
- Public license information: Public file; LMS
- Website: wcsmradio.com

WCSM is an American AM radio station in Celina, Ohio, broadcasting at 1350 kHz on the AM dial. The station is owned with 96.7 WCSM-FM by Brent and Danielle Selhorst, through licensee Buzzards Media, LLC, and also broadcasts on FM translator W262DC at 100.3 MHz, also located in Celina. The station airs a country music format branded as Lake 100.3.

== Brief history ==
WCSM was founded in 1965 by Richard Hunt and C. Oscar Baker who at the time also owned WPTW in Piqua (currently owned by Muzzy Broadcasting Group). It was owned by Hayco Broadcasting from 1977 until 2021, when it was sold to Buzzards Media, LLC. During most of the 1970s, WCSM and its companion FM were owned by Johnston Broadcasting, Inc., Hugh Johnston, President. At that time both stations aired a Middle of the Road (MOR)/adult contemporary format which included the top Country songs. Popular programming included Janie's Corner with Janie Henderson. Service and Music, which allows listeners to buy, sell and trade, remains popular.

WCSM is the second oldest commercial radio station in Mercer County with crosstown WKKI making its initial sign-on in 1960. It was originally a daytimer from its inception until the 1990s when WCSM was given permission to operate with reduced power (11 watts) during the evening hours. Its normal daytime power is 500 watts with a direction pattern reaching neighboring Saint Marys, Wapakoneta, Van Wert and the southwestern suburbs of Lima, and can be received as far north as Bryan in far northwestern Ohio.

Since the late 1980s, departure of former competitor WERM at Moulton near Wapakoneta (later WAXC which then moved its studios to Lima as WZOQ-FM and currently WFGF...previously at 93.1 following a callsign and frequency swap), WCSM has maintained its local image and for the most part remains locally originating in Celina and for many years also operated an additional live studio in downtown St. Marys. Its main studios, offices and AM transmitter remain located on the southwestern corner of Celina at the intersection of Meyer and Schunck Road.

WCSM AM and FM remain as Mercer and Auglaize County's only AM–FM combo still offering locally-originating full-service programming with WKKI-FM being the only competition for the local market. Its slogan and jingle (produced by Dallas' TM Productions) "We Do It For You" has been in use since Hayco's purchase in 1977.

== Programming ==
Until changing to its current Contemporary Country music format in January 2021, WCSM featured an adult standards format from the Music of Your Life network. The station continues to air local high-school sports, and farm programming. WCSM also features newscasts from ABC Radio and the Ohio News Network as well as NASCAR racing while sister WCSM-FM continues in the station's heritage format, adult contemporary. WCSM-AM formerly featured a secondary branding as "Mellow 1350."

WCSM features agricultural news and weather updates several times daily from the Agri Broadcast Network, of which the station is a charter affiliate, and the Buckeye Ag Radio Network (BARN).

== See also ==
- WCSM-FM
