= Celina, Ohio =

- City
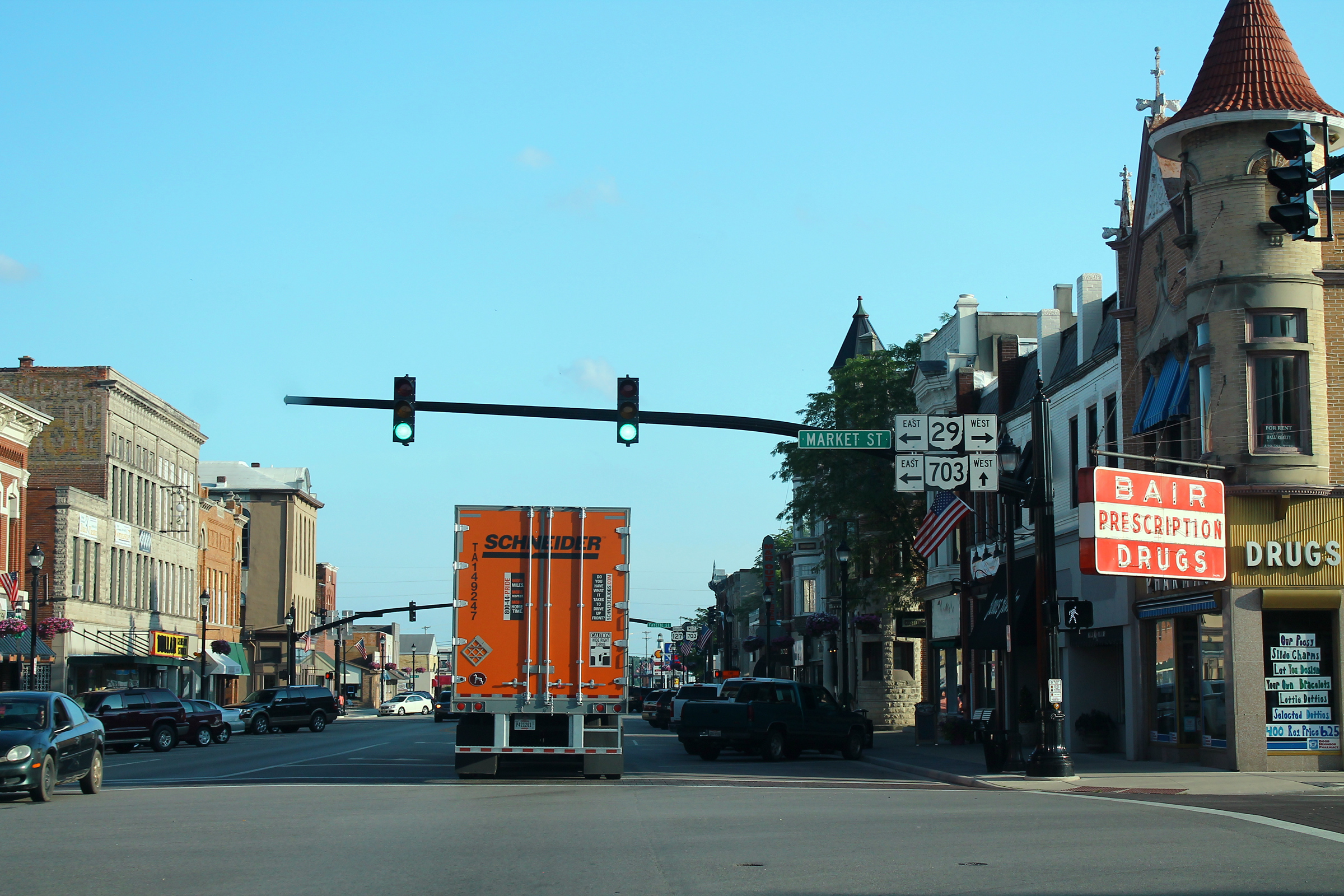
- Downtown Celina

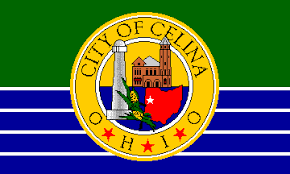
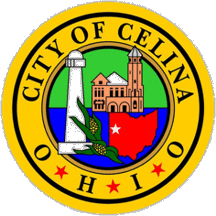
- Flag Seal
- Nickname: C-Town
- Motto: "One Of The 100 Best Small Towns!"
- Interactive map of Celina, Ohio
- Location within Ohio Location within the United States
- Coordinates: 40°33′18″N 84°33′45″W
- Country: United States
- State: Ohio
- County: Mercer
- Township: Center, Jefferson

Government
  - Mayor: Jeffrey Hazel

Area
  - Total: 5.36 sq mi (13.87 km^{2})
  - Land: 5.03 sq mi (13.02 km^{2})
  - Water: 0.32 sq mi (0.84 km^{2})
- Elevation: 886 ft (270 m)

Population (2020)
  - Total: 10,935
  - Estimate (2023): 10,885
  - Density: 2,174.8/sq mi (839.71/km^{2})
- Time zone: UTC-5 (Eastern (EST))
  - Summer (DST): UTC-4 (EDT)
- ZIP codes: 45822, 45826
- Area codes: 419, 567
- FIPS code: 39-12868
- GNIS feature ID: 2393778
- Website: City of Celina, Ohio

Celina (/səˈlaɪnə/ sə-LY-nə) is a city in Mercer County, Ohio, United States, and its county seat. The population was 10,935 at the 2020 census. Located about 58 miles (93 km) northwest of Dayton, Celina is situated on the northwestern shores of Grand Lake St. Marys.

== History ==
James Watson Riley established Celina in 1834. The settlement was named after Salina, New York.

By the 1880s, the town had grown significantly, primarily due to the discovery of deposits of oil and natural gas nearby.

The town was hit by a deadly EF3 tornado on May 27, 2019. Numerous homes, building, trees, and power lines and poles were damaged or destroyed. One person was killed and eight others were injured.

== Geography ==
According to the United States Census Bureau, the city has a total area of 5.27 square miles (13.65 km^{2}), of which 4.98 square miles (12.90 km^{2}) is land and 0.29 square miles (0.75 km^{2}) is water.

=== Climate ===
Climate data for Celina, Ohio (1991–2020 normals, extremes 1897–1899, 1956–present)
Month	Jan	Feb	Mar	Apr	May	Jun	Jul	Aug	Sep	Oct	Nov	Dec	Year
Record high °F (°C)	64 (18)	72 (22)	85 (29)	86 (30)	97 (36)	104 (40)	101 (38)	101 (38)	101 (38)	92 (33)	79 (26)	70 (21)	104 (40)
Mean maximum °F (°C)	54.8 (12.7)	58.7 (14.8)	69.3 (20.7)	79.2 (26.2)	86.7 (30.4)	91.8 (33.2)	92.0 (33.3)	90.3 (32.4)	89.0 (31.7)	81.6 (27.6)	67.7 (19.8)	58.3 (14.6)	93.6 (34.2)
Mean daily maximum °F (°C)	33.7 (0.9)	37.9 (3.3)	48.8 (9.3)	62.7 (17.1)	73.1 (22.8)	81.0 (27.2)	83.7 (28.7)	82.2 (27.9)	77.3 (25.2)	64.7 (18.2)	50.1 (10.1)	38.3 (3.5)	61.1 (16.2)
Daily mean °F (°C)	26.2 (−3.2)	29.7 (−1.3)	39.3 (4.1)	51.2 (10.7)	62.1 (16.7)	70.5 (21.4)	73.4 (23.0)	71.5 (21.9)	65.7 (18.7)	54.2 (12.3)	41.6 (5.3)	31.3 (−0.4)	51.4 (10.8)
Mean daily minimum °F (°C)	18.7 (−7.4)	21.5 (−5.8)	29.7 (−1.3)	39.7 (4.3)	51.1 (10.6)	60.1 (15.6)	63.0 (17.2)	60.9 (16.1)	54.2 (12.3)	43.7 (6.5)	33.1 (0.6)	24.3 (−4.3)	41.7 (5.4)
Mean minimum °F (°C)	−3.1 (−19.5)	1.8 (−16.8)	11.4 (−11.4)	24.3 (−4.3)	35.7 (2.1)	46.7 (8.2)	51.4 (10.8)	49.3 (9.6)	39.8 (4.3)	29.5 (−1.4)	18.2 (−7.7)	6.3 (−14.3)	−6.3 (−21.3)
Record low °F (°C)	−23 (−31)	−24 (−31)	−9 (−23)	9 (−13)	24 (−4)	37 (3)	43 (6)	37 (3)	29 (−2)	20 (−7)	−3 (−19)	−20 (−29)	−24 (−31)
Average precipitation inches (mm)	2.76 (70)	2.32 (59)	2.87 (73)	3.86 (98)	4.05 (103)	4.38 (111)	4.58 (116)	3.56 (90)	2.75 (70)	2.86 (73)	3.15 (80)	2.62 (67)	39.76 (1,010)
Average snowfall inches (cm)	10.8 (27)	7.1 (18)	4.1 (10)	0.5 (1.3)	0.0 (0.0)	0.0 (0.0)	0.0 (0.0)	0.0 (0.0)	0.0 (0.0)	0.1 (0.25)	1.3 (3.3)	4.9 (12)	28.8 (73)
Average precipitation days (≥ 0.01 in)	11.6	9.2	11.1	12.3	12.9	11.1	9.7	8.4	8.0	9.2	9.3	10.4	123.2
Average snowy days (≥ 0.1 in)	6.9	4.5	2.8	0.6	0.0	0.0	0.0	0.0	0.0	0.2	1.0	4.8	20.8
Source: NOAA

== Demographics ==
Historical population
Census	Pop.	Note	%±
1850	222		—
1860	307		38.3%
1870	859		179.8%
1880	1,346		56.7%
1890	2,702		100.7%
1900	2,815		4.2%
1910	3,493		24.1%
1920	4,226		21.0%
1930	4,664		10.4%
1940	4,841		3.8%
1950	5,703		17.8%
1960	7,659		34.3%
1970	7,779		1.6%
1980	9,127		17.3%
1990	9,650		5.7%
2000	10,303		6.8%
2010	10,400		0.9%
2020	10,935		5.1%
2023 (est.)	10,885		−0.5%
U.S. Decennial Census

=== 2020 census ===
As of the 2020 census, Celina had a population of 10,935. The median age was 39.4 years. 23.7% of residents were under the age of 18 and 19.5% of residents were 65 years of age or older. For every 100 females there were 95.7 males, and for every 100 females age 18 and over there were 92.4 males age 18 and over.

99.4% of residents lived in urban areas, while 0.6% lived in rural areas.

There were 4,593 households in Celina, of which 26.9% had children under the age of 18 living in them. Of all households, 42.8% were married-couple households, 19.3% were households with a male householder and no spouse or partner present, and 28.7% were households with a female householder and no spouse or partner present. About 33.1% of all households were made up of individuals and 14.9% had someone living alone who was 65 years of age or older.

There were 4,951 housing units, of which 7.2% were vacant. Among occupied housing units, 61.6% were owner-occupied and 38.4% were renter-occupied. The homeowner vacancy rate was 1.4% and the rental vacancy rate was 5.9%.

Racial composition as of the 2020 census
Race	Number	Percent
White	9,715	88.8%
Black or African American	116	1.1%
American Indian and Alaska Native	36	0.3%
Asian	112	1.0%
Native Hawaiian and Other Pacific Islander	399	3.6%
Some other race	115	1.1%
Two or more races	442	4.0%
Hispanic or Latino (of any race)	381	3.5%

=== 2010 census ===
At the 2010 census there were 10,400 people in 4,264 households, including 2,791 families, in the city. The population density was 2,087.9 inhabitants per square mile (806.1/km^{2}). There were 4,841 housing units at an average density of 1,017.3 per square mile (392.8/km^{2}). The racial makeup of the city was 94.9% White, 0.5% African American, 0.4% Native American, 1.2% Asian, 0.4% Pacific Islander. Hispanic or Latino of any race were 2.8%.

Of the 4,329 households 31.8% had children under the age of 18 living with them, 45.5% were married couples living together, 13.0% had a female householder with no husband present, and 35.5% were non-families. 30.7% of households were one person and 27.8% were one person aged 65 or older. The average household size was 2.37 and the average family size was 2.94.

The age distribution was 27.9% under the age of 19, 24.4% from 20 to 39, 26.2% from 40 to 59, 15.5% from 60 to 79, and 6.1% who were 80 years of age or older. The median age was 38.3 years.

=== 2000 census ===
At the 2000 census there were 10,303 people in 4,191 households, including 2,745 families, in the city. The population density was 2,346.9 inhabitants per square mile (906.1/km^{2}). There were 4,466 housing units at an average density of 1,017.3 per square mile (392.8/km^{2}). The racial makeup of the city was 97.04% White, 0.18% African American, 0.37% Native American, 0.67% Asian, 0.02% Pacific Islander, 0.62% from other races, and 1.10% from two or more races. Hispanic or Latino of any race were 2.14%.

Of the 4,191 households 33.7% had children under the age of 18 living with them, 50.3% were married couples living together, 11.7% had a female householder with no husband present, and 34.5% were non-families. 30.5% of households were one person and 14.9% were one person aged 65 or older. The average household size was 2.42 and the average family size was 3.04.

The age distribution was 27.2% under the age of 18, 9.0% from 18 to 24, 26.8% from 25 to 44, 21.0% from 45 to 64, and 16.0% 65 or older. The median age was 36 years. For every 100 females, there were 91.5 males. For every 100 females age 18 and over, there were 85.8 males.

The median household income was $36,057 and the median family income was $44,901. Males had a median income of $35,467 versus $22,008 for females. The per capita income for the city was $18,200. About 8.1% of families and 11.7% of the population were below the poverty line, including 16.7% of those under age 18 and 10.5% of those age 65 or over.

== Economy ==
Huffy Bicycle and Mersman Furniture formerly had manufacturing plants in Celina but have since closed. Companies such as Celina Aluminum Precision Technology (a Honda supplier), Crown Equipment Corporation (located in Huffy's former location), and Reynolds and Reynolds are the largest manufacturing employers. Eighth Floor, LLC, Thieman Tailgates, McKirnan Brothers, Inc. and Celina Tent Inc. are also based out of Celina. Agriculture is a significant part of the economy, including soybeans, corn, and wheat.

== Arts and culture ==
Celina hosts the annual Freedom Days Picnic in early July in honor of American Independence.

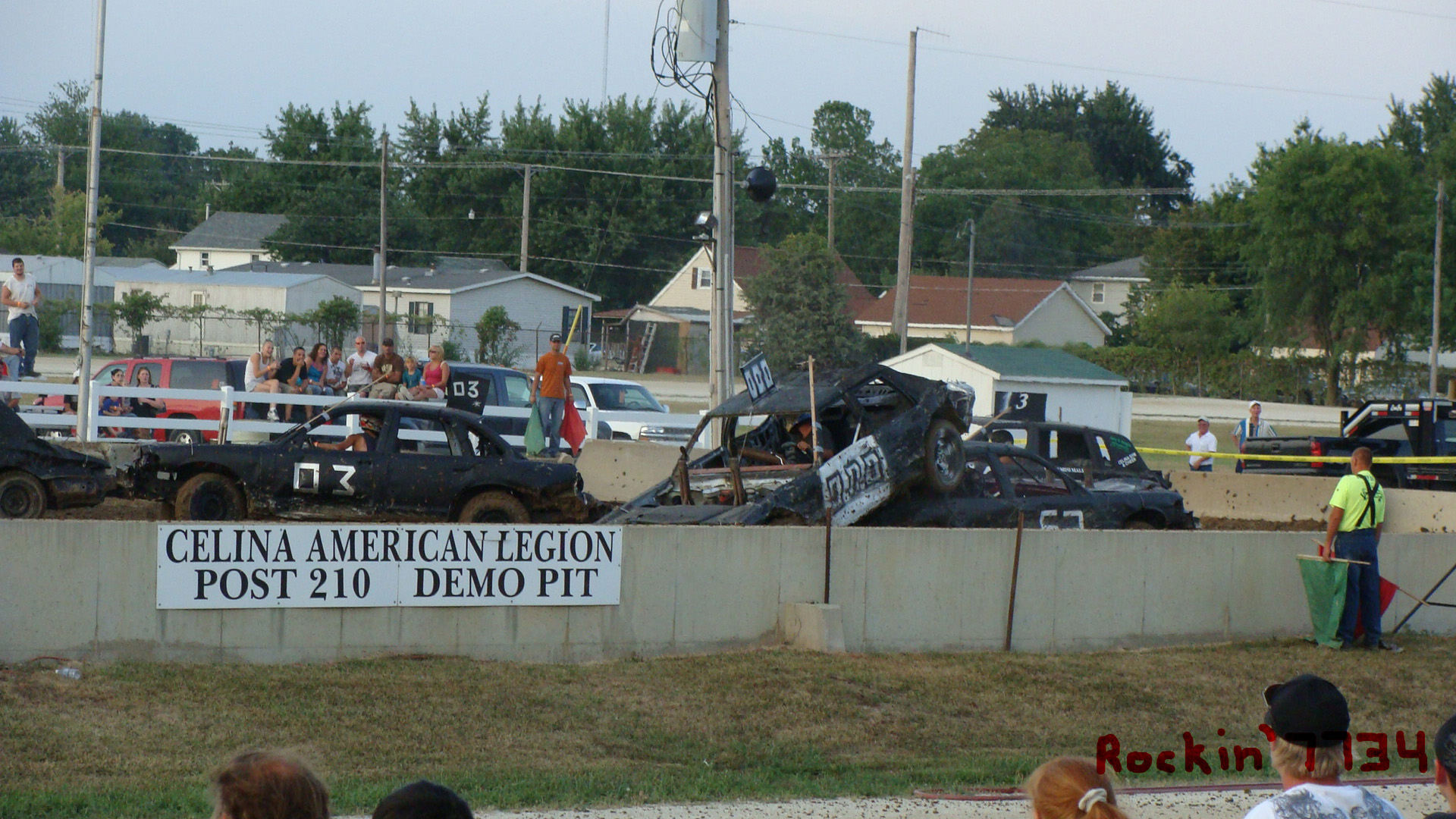
Mercer County Fair Demo Derby

During the last weekend in July, Celina hosts the annual Celina Lake Festival to celebrate Celina's history on Grand Lake St. Marys. The Lake Festival is host to one of the largest Amphicar gatherings in the world. The cars gather on Friday night for a "swim-in".

During the second week in August, Celina is home to the Mercer County Fair and hosts many arts and crafts, livestock, food, rides, and the demolition derby.

Celina hosts the annual Governors Cup Regatta which features hydroplane racing on Grand Lake St. Marys.

== Education ==
=== Public schools ===
Celina Public Schools belong to the Celina City School District. The district has three elementary schools, a middle school and a high school.

The district reorganized the grade locations for the 2014 school year. The schools include Celina Primary School (K–2), Celina Elementary School (3–4), Celina Intermediate Elementary School (5–6), Celina Middle School (7–8), and Celina High School (9–12). There is an alternative high school located at the Education Complex.

The Celina-Mercer County Head Start Program is for children in Pre-School. There are two locations in the Celina district where Head Start is located: The Celina City Schools Education Complex and the Celina City Schools Franklin Building.

There are Tri-Star classes located at the Celina High School, the Celina City Schools Education Complex, and the Franklin Building.

=== Colleges and universities ===
Wright State University's Lake Campus is located off State Route 703 on 600 Lake Campus Drive in Celina.

=== Libraries ===
The Mercer County District Library's main library is located at 303 North Main Street in Celina. The district library also has branches in St. Henry, Mendon, and Chickasaw.

== Media ==
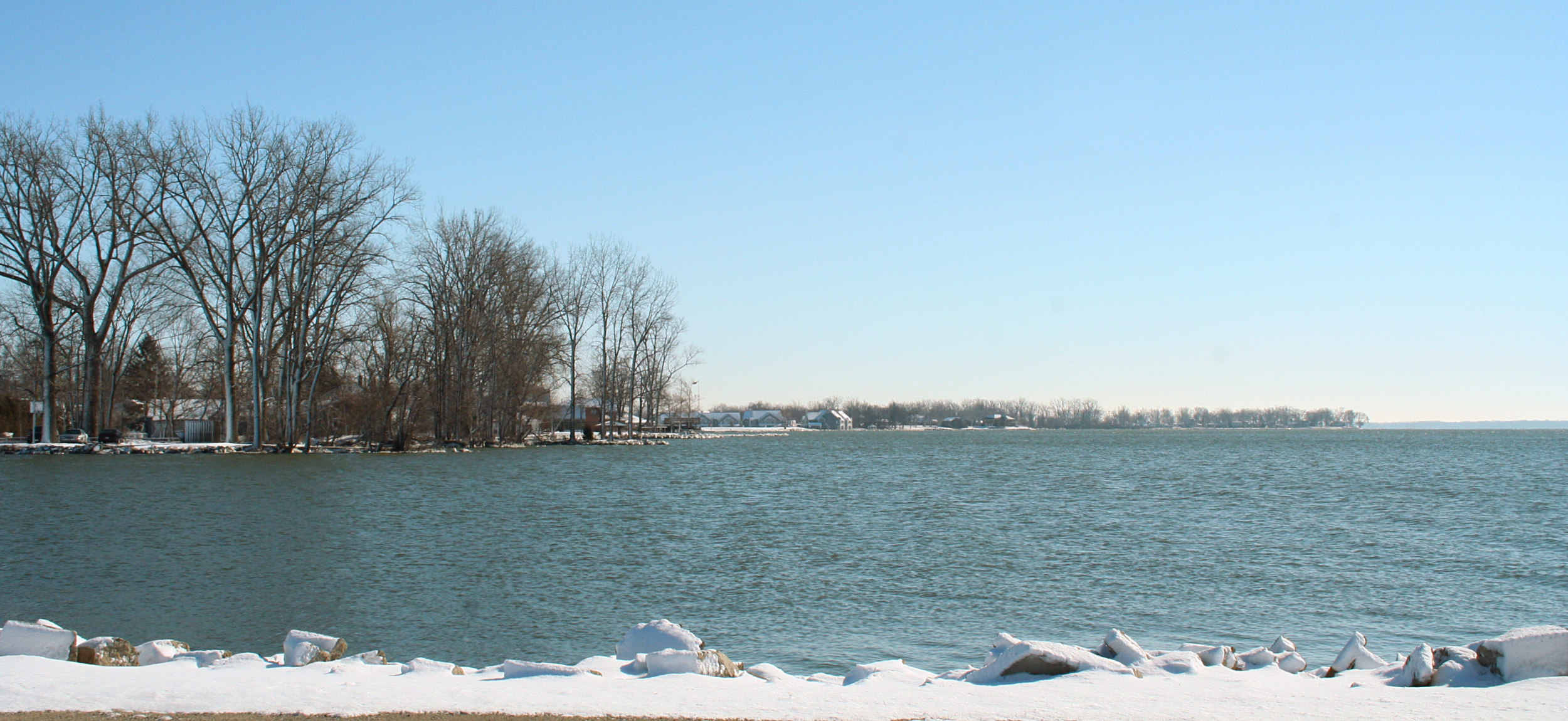
Grand Lake

Celina is served by a daily newspaper, The Daily Standard, first published in 1848. It circulates about 10,000 copies a day.

Celina is also served by three local radio stations, WCSM AM and FM and WKKI FM. WCSM-FM broadcasts at 96.7 and plays adult contemporary music. WCSM-AM broadcasts at 1350 and features news, talk, and the Music of Your Life adult standards format. WKKI broadcasts at 94.3 and plays rock.

== Infrastructure ==
=== Transportation ===
Lakefield Airport is located four nautical miles (4.6 mi; 7.4 km) south of Celina's central business district.

== Notable people ==
- Vera Barstow (1891–1975), violinist born in Celina
- Mike Bath (born 1977), American football player (1997–2000) and interim head coach (2013) at Miami University
- Galen Cisco, baseball player and coach. Resident of Celina after his career was over.
- Mindy Cook (born 1988), silver medalist at the 2020 Summer Paralympics in goalball.
- Rick Derringer (1947–2025), musician
- Keith Faber (born 1966), 94th President of the Ohio Senate; 33rd Ohio Auditor
- Tennyson Guyer (1912–1981), Mayor of Celina (1940–44); U.S. House of Representatives (1973–81)
- Frank Le Blond Kloeb (1890–1976), U.S. House of Representatives (1933–37)
- Charles Hubert Le Blond (1883–1958) 4th Roman Catholic Bishop of St. Joseph, Missouri (1933–56)
- Shelly Mars (born 1960), performance artist, actor, and printmaker
- Wendell Mobley, country music songwriter
- Jim Otis (born 1948), running back at Ohio State (1967–69), National Football League (1970–79); Pro Bowl (1975)
- Dan Pifer (born 1972), Head Football Coach at Olivet College
- Cody Reichard (born 1987), ice hockey player
- Keven Stammen (born 1985), poker player
- John W. Sweeterman (1907–1998) publisher of The Washington Post (1961–68)
- Jackie Tavener (1897–1969), shortstop in Major League Baseball (1921, 1925–29)
- William E. Tou Velle (1862–1951), U.S. House of Representatives (1907–11)
- Samuel J. Vining (1864–1914), Speaker of the Ohio House of Representatives (1911–13)
- Mike Wessel (born 1977), mixed martial arts fighter
- Mildred Wolfe (1912–2009), artist
