= KMPO =

Radio Bilingüe radio station in Modesto, California, United States

- Modesto, California; United States
- Broadcast area: San Joaquin Valley
- Frequency: 88.7 MHz

Programming
- Language: Spanish
- Format: Public radio

Ownership
- Owner: Radio Bilingüe, Inc.

History
- First air date: 1984

Technical information
- Licensing authority: FCC
- Facility ID: 54493
- Class: B
- ERP: 2,050 watts
- HAAT: 622 meters (2,041 ft)
- Transmitter coordinates: 37°32′0″N 120°1′29″W
- Translators: 93.7 K229CN (Tassajara); 104.1 K281BR (Hollister)

Links
- Public license information: Public file; LMS
- Website: radiobilingue.org

KMPO (88.7 FM) is a radio station broadcasting a Spanish public radio format. It serves the Modesto area of the northern San Joaquin Valley. The station is licensed to Modesto, California, United States, and is owned by Radio Bilingüe, Inc.

== See also ==
- List of community radio stations in the United States
