= KSJV =

Radio Bilingüe radio station in Fresno, California, United States

- Fresno, California; United States
- Broadcast area: Fresno metropolitan area
- Frequency: 91.5 MHz (HD Radio)
- Branding: Radio Bilingüe

Programming
- Format: Spanish Variety

Ownership
- Owner: Radio Bilingüe, Inc.

History
- First air date: 1980
- Call sign meaning: San Joaquin Valley

Technical information
- Licensing authority: FCC
- Facility ID: 54496
- Class: B
- ERP: 16,000 watts
- HAAT: 265 meters (869 ft)
- Transmitter coordinates: 36°38′15″N 118°56′35″W
- Translator: 98.7 K254CA (Guadalupe) 97.1 K246BO (Paso Robles) 92.9 K225BQ (Santa Margarita)

Links
- Public license information: Public file; LMS
- Website: radiobilingue.org

KSJV (91.5 FM) is a radio station broadcasting a Spanish Variety format. Licensed to Fresno, California, United States, the station serves the Fresno area. The station is currently owned by Radio Bilingüe, Inc. The station is also broadcast on HD radio.

== See also ==
- List of community radio stations in the United States
