= NATV Native American Television =

United States organization

NATV: Native American Television is a Native American media organization in the United States that provides news, educational, cultural, and entertainment programming for Native American audiences. Founded in 1990, the organization is operated by Native Americans and is based in Williamsburg, Virginia. NATV distributes programming online and has made content available to television channels and broadcasters in the United States and Canada.

== History ==
NATV was founded in 1990 as a Native American-operated media organization. The network was established to provide Native American communities with news, educational, cultural, and entertainment programming created from Indigenous perspectives. NATV has been described as an effort to increase Native American representation in television and to provide culturally relevant broadcasting for Indigenous audiences whose experiences and concerns have historically been underrepresented in mainstream media.

== See also ==
- AIROS Native Radio Network
