= Celina High School (Ohio) =

Coordinates: 40.556°N 84.558°W

Location
- 715 E. Wayne Street; Celina, Ohio 45822

Information
- School district: Celina City School District
- Principal: Renee Kramer
- Teaching staff: 47.00 (FTE)
- Grades: 9-12
- Enrollment: 743 (2024-2025)
- Student to teacher ratio: 15.81
- Color
- Team name: Bulldogs
- Yearbook: ANILEC
- Website: Celina High School

Celina Senior High School is a public high school located in Celina, Ohio, United States. It is the only high school in the city. Their mascot is a bulldog. They are members of the Western Buckeye League. The average enrollment is around 1,100 students.

== Ohio High School Athletic Association State Championships ==
- Boys' Bowling - 2018
- Girls' Basketball - 1991
- Girls' Bowling - 2026

== Administrators ==
Position	Name
Superintendent	Dr. Ken Schmiesing
Principal	Renee Kramer
Assistant Principal	Derek Wenning

== Notable alumni ==
- Z. Susanne Aikman (class of 1963)
- Jim Otis - Fullback for the Ohio State University Buckeyes from 1967 to 1969; NFL career with the New Orleans Saints, Kansas City Chiefs, and St. Louis Cardinals; most notable fullback to come out of Mercer County
- Dan Pifer
