= WCSM-FM =

Radio station in Celina, Ohio

- Celina, Ohio; United States
- Broadcast area: Mercer County, Ohio; Auglaize County, Ohio
- Frequency: 96.7 MHz
- Branding: 96.7 The Wave

Programming
- Format: Hot adult contemporary Full-service radio
- Affiliations: ABC News Radio; Agri Broadcast Network; Buckeye Ag Radio Network; Cincinnati Bengals Radio Network; Cleveland Cavaliers Radio Network; Ohio State Sports Network

Ownership
- Owner: Brent and Danielle Selhorst; (Buzzards Media, LLC)
- Sister stations: WCSM

History
- First air date: 1968
- Call sign meaning: Celina - St. Marys

Technical information
- Licensing authority: FCC
- Facility ID: 26471
- Class: A
- ERP: 2,200 watts
- HAAT: 120 meters (390 ft)
- Transmitter coordinates: 40.553°N 84.517°W

Links
- Public license information: Public file; LMS
- Webcast: Listen live
- Website: www.wcsmradio.com

WCSM-FM is an American FM radio station broadcasting at 96.7 MHz in Celina, Ohio. The station features a full-service hot adult contemporary format with local news, weather, sports and agricultural programming. It is co-owned with 1350 WCSM and the two stations simulcast with local news and farm programming, although WCSM's music format is Country music. WCSM-FM music programming comes from Westwood One's mainstream Adult Contemporary service evenings, overnights and weekends.

WCSM-FM's primary coverage area includes Celina and the surrounding towns including St. Marys, Spencerville, Mendon, Rockford, Coldwater, and New Bremen.

WCSM-FM is a charter affiliate of the Agri Broadcast Network and features ABN and Buckeye Ag Radio Network farm news and weather updates throughout the day on weekdays. Both stations also feature high school sports heavily, though the AM and FM stations have different sports schedules.

Its studios and offices remain located at the intersection of Meyer and Schunck Road while its FM transmitter is now located at the Dibble Road tower which is also the location of WPTD's translator W17AA near Wright State's West Ohio Branch Campus at Grand Lake St. Marys.

On June 1, 2022, WCSM-FM changed the adult contemporary portion of its format to hot adult contemporary, branded as "96.7 The Wave".
