= Radio Bilingüe =

US non-profit membership media organization

Radio Bilingüe is a nonprofit, Latino-led public media network based in Fresno, California. It produces and distributes news, public-affairs, cultural, and music programming primarily for Latino, immigrant, farmworker, and Indigenous Mexican communities. Its programming is broadcast mainly in Spanish, with additional content in English and Mexican-Indigenous languages including Mixteco and Triqui.

As of 2026, Radio Bilingüe owns and operates 30 noncommercial stations and transmitters in California, Arizona, Colorado, New Mexico, Oregon, and Texas. Its nationally distributed programming is also carried by more than 75 affiliate stations in the United States. The network’s broadcasts are also available through online streaming and digital platforms.

== Organization and reach ==
Radio Bilingüe operates as a noncommercial educational broadcaster and national program producer. Its owned stations serve communities throughout California’s Central Valley, Central Coast, and other rural regions, as well as areas of the Southwest and Pacific Northwest. Through its affiliate network, its programs are heard in urban and rural communities across the country. Radio Bilingüe provides its nationally distributed programming to affiliate stations without charge, allowing smaller public and community stations to carry Spanish-language news and cultural programming without purchasing it.

The network is governed and operated with Latino leadership. Its stated mission is to provide news, cultural programming, and public-service information to communities that are underserved by other media, particularly low-income Latino and Indigenous audiences. In 2025, El País described Radio Bilingüe as the largest Spanish-language public radio network in the United States and reported that its news programming reached approximately half a million listeners each month.

== Programming ==
Radio Bilingüe’s schedule combines journalism, call-in programs, community information, and music. Its news and public-affairs coverage includes immigration, health, labor rights, education, elections, environmental issues, and access to government and community services. Programs frequently include interviews with public officials, researchers, advocates, artists, and community members, as well as opportunities for listeners to call in with questions or personal experiences.

The network’s nationally distributed programs include Línea Abierta, a Spanish-language news and call-in program, and Noticiero Latino, its Spanish-language news service. Radio Bilingüe also produces programs serving Indigenous Mexican communities, including programming in Mixteco and Triqui.

Music and cultural programming form another major part of the schedule. The network broadcasts regional Mexican, mariachi, norteño, conjunto, Afro-Caribbean, and other Latin American musical traditions. Cultural programs feature artists, community celebrations, oral traditions, and discussions of Latino and Indigenous identity and culture.

== Community service ==
Radio Bilingüe’s programming emphasizes information intended for practical use by listeners. Its broadcasts have included information about workplace protections, immigration policy, health care, public benefits, voting, emergency preparedness, and other issues affecting rural and working-class communities. Some programs allow listeners to speak directly with attorneys, health professionals, government representatives, and community-service providers.

The network also works with local organizations, public agencies, and nonprofit groups to produce public-service campaigns and community forums. Its programming is designed particularly for audiences who may face language, geographic, economic, or technological barriers to obtaining news and public information through other sources.

Unlike most Spanish-language radio networks in the United States, Radio Bilingüe combines national journalism with regional music, Indigenous-language programming, and locally produced community programs. Its schedule includes a weekly call-in program in Mixteco and Triqui, music ranging from mariachi and norteño to Afro-Caribbean traditions, and nighttime programming for incarcerated listeners.

Radio Bilingüe
- Type: Public radio network
- Country: United States
- First air date: July 4, 1980; 46 years ago
- Availability: Global
- Founded: 1976; 50 years ago
- Headquarters: 5005 East Belmont Avenue; Fresno, CA, U.S.
- Broadcast area: United States Mexico Puerto Rico
- Key people: Hugo Morales (radio) (Executive Director & Co-Founder)
- Former names: La Voz que Rompío el Silencio (The Voice that Broke the Silence)
- Official website: radiobilingue.org

== History ==
Radio Bilingüe was established in Fresno in 1976 by Hugo Morales and a group that included farmworkers, educators, artists, students, and other community members. The organization was incorporated as a nonprofit in 1977.

The Federal Communications Commission approved the organization’s application for KSJV 91.5 FM in Fresno in 1979. The station began broadcasting on July 4, 1980, with a small paid staff and a larger group of community volunteers. Its early schedule combined Mexican and other Latin American music with public-affairs programming about issues affecting farmworkers and Spanish-speaking residents of the San Joaquin Valley, including immigration, pesticide exposure, labor rights, and bilingual education.

Radio Bilingüe initially operated from the Mason Building on Fresno’s Fulton Mall. Its transmitter was located at Eshom Point in the Sierra Nevada, extending the station’s signal across much of the San Joaquin Valley.

In 1993, the organization launched Satélite Radio Bilingüe, a 24-hour satellite programming service that distributed its Spanish-language news, public-affairs, and cultural programming to affiliate stations outside California. The satellite service contributed to Radio Bilingüe’s development from a regional broadcaster into a national public-radio program distributor.

== Transmitters ==
=== Network-owned stations ===
The following full-power stations and associated low-power translators are owned-and-operated by Radio Bilingüe:

Call sign	Frequency	City of license	FID	ERP (W)	HAAT	Class	Transmitter coordinates	FCC info
KREE	88.1 FM	Pirtleville, Arizona	174148	1500	57 m (187 ft)	A	31°20′54.4″N 109°28′48.2″W	LMS
KTQX	90.1 FM	Bakersfield, California	54494	570	1,096 m (3,596 ft)	B	35°27′10.8″N 118°35′28.3″W	LMS
KUBO	88.7 FM	Calexico, California	54495	17000	213 m (699 ft)	B	32°57′29″N 115°50′22″W	LMS
KHDC	90.9 FM	Chualar, California	54497	3000	69 m (226 ft)	A	36°34′53.8″N 121°26′37.7″W	LMS
KSJV	91.5 FM	Fresno, California	54496	16000	267 m (876 ft)	B	36°38′14.8″N 118°56′38.3″W	LMS
KVUH	88.5 FM	Laytonville, California	90983	1000	−592 m (−1,942 ft)	B	39°41′37.5″N 123°34′47″W	LMS
KITE	94.7 FM	Leggett, California	77795	1900	119 m (390 ft)	B	39°52′06.3″N 123°42′50.8″W	LMS
KMPO	88.7 FM	Modesto, California	54493	2050	616 m (2,021 ft)	B	37°31′59.8″N 120°1′32.6″W	LMS
KWMS	91.3 FM	Williams, California	767696	230	179 m (587 ft)	A	39°17′16.4″N 122°20′5.3″W	LMS
KHUI	89.1 FM	Alamosa, Colorado	177171	200	28 m (92 ft)	A	37°30′33″N 105°51′11.1″W	LMS
KYOL	91.7 FM	Chama, New Mexico	172922	220	100 m (328 ft)	A	36°53′58″N 106°36′8.1″W	LMS
KQTO	88.1 FM	Hurley, New Mexico	173481	2000 (horiz.)	472 m (1,549 ft)	C2	32°51′43.2″N 108°14′30.1″W	LMS
KVMG	88.9 FM	Raton, New Mexico	177164	450	284 m (932 ft)	A	36°59′33.1″N 104°28′26″W	LMS
KTLU	91.7 FM	Merrill, Oregon	763580	160	265 m (869 ft)	A	42°5′31″N 121°26′40″W	LMS
KRZU	90.7 FM	Batesville, Texas	173409	100 (horiz.)	148 m (486 ft)	C1	28°47′54.9″N 99°35′38.2″W	LMS
KRBP	88.1 FM	Presidio, Texas	172361	500	−22 m (−72 ft)	A	29°34′16″N 104°21′45″W	LMS
KXJT	88.3 FM	Rio Grande City, Texas	174932	2650	144 m (472 ft)	A	26°25′42.2″N 98°49′39.1″W	LMS
KNOO	88.1 FM	Sierra Blanca, Texas	766981	100	22 m (72 ft)	A	31°11′15.3″N 105°21′21.1″W	LMS
KHEM	89.3 FM	Zapata, Texas	172355	250	14 m (46 ft)	A	26°53′56.1″N 99°15′28.1″W	LMS

Broadcast translator for KHDC
Call sign	Frequency	City of license	FID	ERP (W)	HAAT	Class	Transmitter coordinates	FCC info
K233AV	94.5 FM	Paso Robles, California	146102	10	229 m (751 ft)	D	35°38′44.8″N 120°44′19.6″W	LMS

Broadcast translators for KMPO
Call sign	Frequency	City of license	FID	ERP (W)	HAAT	Class	Transmitter coordinates	FCC info
K281BR	104.1 FM	Hollister, California	143260	250	−208 m (−682 ft)	D	36°52′1.8″N 121°24′1.8″W	LMS
K229CN	93.7 FM	Tassajara, California	141249	10	−226 m (−741 ft)	D	37°49′16.7″N 121°46′52.8″W	LMS
K296MB	107.1 FM	Galt, California	142777	10	−215 m (−705 ft)	D	38°15′27.7″N 121°17′32.6″W	LMS

Broadcast translators for KSJV
Call sign	Frequency	City of license	FID	ERP (W)	HAAT	Class	Transmitter coordinates	FCC info
K254CA	98.7 FM	Guadalupe, California	141271	10	437 m (1,434 ft)	D	34°53′51.9″N 120°35′28.6″W	LMS
K246BO	97.1 FM	Paso Robles, California	146718	10	229 m (751 ft)	D	35°38′44.8″N 120°44′19.6″W	LMS
K225BQ	92.9 FM	Santa Margarita, California	141268	10	438 m (1,437 ft)	D	35°21′36.9″N 120°39′19.6″W	LMS

Broadcast translators for KTQX
Call sign	Frequency	City of license	FID	ERP (W)	HAAT	Class	Transmitter coordinates	FCC info
K258CK	99.5 FM	Barstow, California	141265	10	66 m (217 ft)	D	34°51′45.9″N 117°3′23.1″W	LMS
K300DX	107.9 FM	Palmdale, California	141254	10	638 m (2,093 ft)	D	34°32′50.9″N 118°13′0.4″W	LMS

Broadcast translators for KUBO
Call sign	Frequency	City of license	FID	ERP (W)	HAAT	Class	Transmitter coordinates	FCC info
K224EV	92.7 FM	Ligurta, Arizona	141316	10	399 m (1,309 ft)	D	32°40′25.1″N 114°20′15.7″W	LMS
K266BX	101.1 FM	Cactus City, California	141317	10	187 m (614 ft)	D	33°39′20.1″N 115°59′11″W	LMS

Broadcast translator for KWMS
Call sign	Frequency	City of license	FID	ERP (W)	HAAT	Class	Transmitter coordinates	FCC info
K290EF	105.9 FM	Lincoln, California	141306	10	252 m (827 ft)	D	38°55′36.2″N 121°20′12.2″W	LMS

=== Full-time affiliates ===
The following full-power stations and associated low-power translator are full-time affiliates of Radio Bilingüe:

Call sign	Frequency	City of license	FID	ERP (W)	HAAT	Class	Transmitter coordinates	FCC info	Notes
KERU-FM	88.5 FM	Blythe, California	19750	1000	674 m (2,211 ft)	B	33°34′12.1″N 114°20′57.8″W	LMS	20 hours a day
KBSX-HD3	(91.5-3) FM	Boise, Idaho	28243	27000	850 m (2,789 ft)	C	43°45′20.8″N 116°5′57″W	LMS	24 hours a day
K291BP	106.1 FM	Bettendorf, Iowa	62091	250	34 m (112 ft)	D	41°32′26.1″N 90°34′56.4″W	LMS	Translating KALA-HD2
KALA-HD2	(88.1-2) FM	Davenport, Iowa	62090	10000 (horiz.); 9330 (vert.)	98 m (322 ft)	C3	41°35′43.9″N 90°40′44.2″W	LMS	24 hours a day
KUUB	88.3 FM	Salt Lake City, Utah	13481	450	412 m (1,352 ft)	C2	40°37′53.1″N 112°7′53″W	LMS	24 hours a day
KOCA-LP	93.5 FM	Laramie, Wyoming	125800	100	−56 m (−184 ft)	L1	41°18′47.9″N 105°35′1.9″W	LMS	24 hours a day
