= Wattis =

Wattis is a surname. Notable people with the surname include:

- Edmund Orson Wattis Jr. (1855–1934), American businessman
- Edmund Wattis Littlefield (1914–2001), American businessman
- Phyllis Wattis (1905–2002), American art patron
- Richard Wattis (1912–1975), British actor
- William H. Wattis (1859–1931), American businessman
