= William H. Wattis =

American businessman (1859–1931)

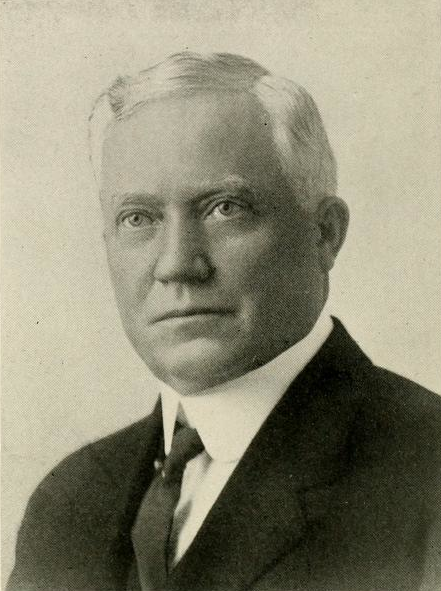
- Born: William Henry Wattis; August 15, 1859; Uinta, Utah Territory, U.S.
- Died: September 13, 1931 (aged 72); San Francisco, California, U.S.
- Resting place: Uintah, Utah, U.S.
- Spouse: Anna Maria Dorothea Sophie Stander (m. 1889)
- Children: 4
- Relatives: Edmund Orson Wattis (brother)

William Henry Wattis (August 15, 1859 – September 13, 1931) was one of the three Wattis Brothers who founded Utah Construction Company in 1900.

== Early life ==
William Henry Wattis was born on August 15, 1859, in Uinta, Utah Territory, the fourth of seven children born to Edmund Orson Wattis and Mary Jane Corey. With his brother Edmund Orson Wattis, he formed a firm to lay track for the expanding railroads. The fledgling Wattis Brothers firm was wiped out in the panic of 1893. While William continued to try to find construction projects, Edmund focused his energies on running a sheep ranch the brothers had established in the Weber Valley. This ranch and others would later provide the financial strength for the large construction projects to come.

Wattis married his sweetheart, Anna Maria Dorothea Sophie "Marie" Stander, on January 9, 1889. They had three daughters and one son. In 1897, they lost Florence Louise, age 5, and Edmund (Teddy), age 1, within six months of each other while living in Astoria, Oregon.

== Utah Construction Company ==
In 1900, the Wattis Brothers (Edmund, William and Warren) again attempted to be partners in contracting. They founded the Utah Construction Company along with David Eccles and Thomas D. Dee. A short four years after its founding, Utah Construction Company was awarded the contract to build the Feather River route between Oakland and Salt Lake City. This $60 million contract was challenging, but after five years, very profitable. The Feather River route was complete for the Western Pacific Railroad in 1911. The Utah Construction Company also was a building contractor for the Utah State Capital.

In 1912, after the death of David Eccles, W. H. was elected President of The Utah Construction Company. The company thrived, and soon captured a large share of the tunneling, grading, and track projects in the rapidly expanding railroads in the mountain west. Seeing the end of railroad expansion, the Wattis Brothers looked for ways to diversify their construction risks.

== Wattis Coal Company ==
In 1915, the Wattis brothers bought the Wattis Coal Company (160 acres from the federal government) and the Wattis mine shipped its first coal on April 11, 1918. The ghost town of Wattis, Utah, located south of Price, is named after the Wattis brothers. In 1919 the company merged with the Lion Coal Company, owned by the Eccles family.

== Ogden Union Stockyard Company ==
On July 29, 1916, Wattis formed a partnership in incorporating the Ogden Union Stockyard Company (opened for business April 1, 1917), formerly known as the Ogden Packing and Provision Company, which proved to be quite profitable—by 1934 the company made over $2 million.

== Building dams ==
In 1917, Utah Construction Company was awarded the $7 million O'Shaughnessy Dam contract, a controversial project that impounds the Tuolumne River in the Hetch Hetchy Valley of California's Sierra Nevada mountains. Success with the O'Shaughnessy Dam convinced the Wattis Brothers to bid on more dam projects.

In 1922, Utah Construction Company formed a partnership with the Morrison-Knudsen Company of Boise, Idaho. With Frank Crowe as the chief engineer, the MK UC partnership successfully built dams throughout the American west.

== Politics and committees ==
In 1918, Wattis was nominated by the Republican Party to run for a seat in the U.S. House of Representatives. He was defeated by Milton H. Welling. Wattis ran unsuccessfully for governor of Utah in 1928, losing to George Dern.

He was appointed to the Flood Relief Committee by Governor Mabey on August 17, 1923, and appointed to the Christmas Seal Sale Advisory Committee in 1924.

== Other businesses ==
Wattis was also a prominent businessman in Ogden, Utah and known throughout Utah. He was director of The National Bank, director of the Utah-Idaho Central Railroad, and president of Dee Memorial Hospital from 1917 to 1929. As president he oversaw the new L-shaped addition equipped with elevators, making Dee one of the most modern and up-to-date hospitals of its time at an estimated cost of $160,000.

In January 1921, Wattis was elected general manager and president of Utah-Idaho Sugar Company and vice president and general manager of the Canadian Sugar Company Ltd., the Canadian branch of Utah-Idaho Sugar Company. Due to political and legal troubles with the Utah-Idaho Sugar Company, Wattis was indicted on price fixing charges and was found in contempt of court by Judge Tilman D. Johnson, which caused him to withdraw from a 1920 run for governor.

He was elected Captain of the Alta Club, one of the oldest gentlemen's clubs in Utah, on April 22, 1921.

On September 27, 1927, Wattis was nominated and elected vice president of the Associated General Contractors of America, and later nominated on October 20, 1927, to be the vice president over the states of Utah, Nevada, California and Arizona.

In 1929, the Wattis Brothers spearheaded the formation of Six Companies to build the Hoover Dam, which was the largest construction project ever tackled by the US Government up to that time. Wattis was elected as the Six Companies' first president.

== Death ==
On March 23, 1931, Time Magazine wrote:

Last week small, spry, white-haired William Wattis was in San Francisco's St. Francis Hospital taking the Coffey-Humber cancer treatment when word reached him that his company had won the contract to build Hoover Dam. His jolly blue eyes snapped with delight. Wrapped in his bathrobe, and puffing a big, black cigar he talked eagerly: "Now this dam is just a dam but it's a damn big dam. Otherwise it's no different than others we've thrown up in a dozen places. It involves a lot of money—more money than any one contractor has a right to have. ... I don't know when I'll get out of here. I think I am improving but don't worry, I'll be on this job."

However, he did not live to see Hoover Dam completed. Wattis died in San Francisco, California, on September 13, 1931, of cancer. Shortly before his death on June 9, 1931, the University of Utah honored him with a Doctorate of Law degree. Wattis was buried next to his parents at a cemetery in Unitah.

Wattis loved life, family and friends. He was an avid golfer, hunter and traveler.

== Sources ==
- Alta Club Photograph Collection, box 3, 235 W.H. Wattis, University of Utah Library Collection
- Arrington, Leonard J. Beet Sugar in the West: a History of the Utah-Idaho Sugar Company 1891-1966, p. 95-97, 109.
- Davis County Clipper
- Sessions, Sterling and Gene. History of Utah International: From Construction to Mining

Stevens, Joseph E. Hoover Dam: An American Adventure

- Inside the Hoover Dam Scrapbooks, WSU, Special Collections
- Powell, Allan Kent. Labor at the Beginning of the 20th Century: Carbon County, Utah Coal Fields, 1900 to 1905
- New York Times, June 28, 1911 / May 25, 1920
- Ogden Standard Examiner
- Time Magazine
- University of Nevada, Las Vegas Special Collections
- Utah State Historical Society
- Weber State University Special Collection and Archive departments
- Photo of W. H. and E. O. Wattis
- Western Mining and Railroad Museum, Helper, Utah
- Generous donations made to numerous universities in Utah, Nevada, California and Idaho by the Wattis family

Party political offices
Preceded by Charles R. Mabey	Republican nominee for Governor of Utah; 1928	Succeeded by William W. Seegmiller
