= Boulder City Historic District =

Historic district in Nevada, United States

- U.S. National Register of Historic Places
- U.S. Historic district
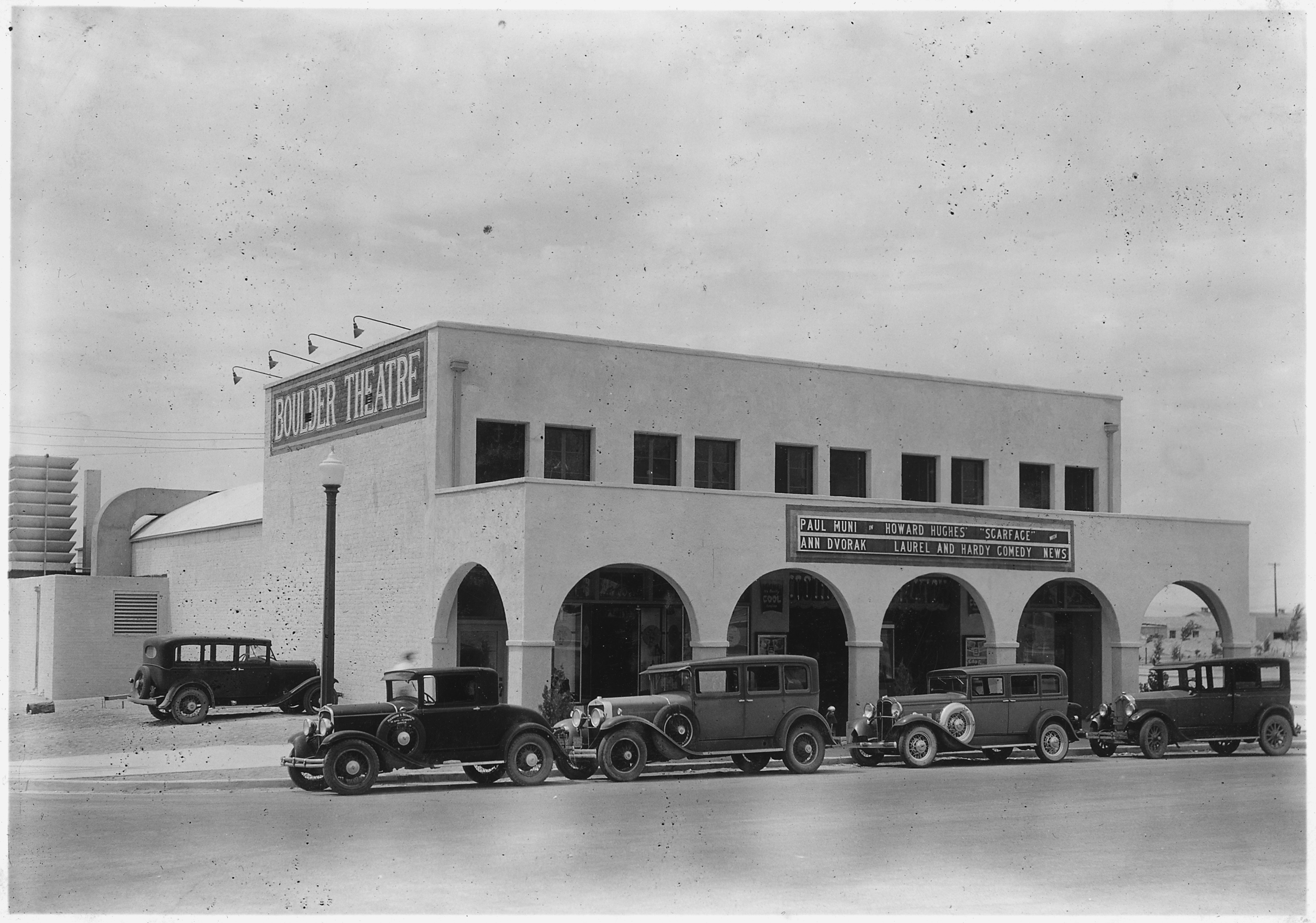
- Boulder Theatre—a contributing property—in July 1932 (Scarface is playing)

- Location within Nevada Location within the United States
- Location: Roughly bounded by Nevada Hwy., Avenue L, Date, and 5th Sts., Boulder City, Nevada
- Coordinates: 35°58′40″N 114°50′3″W
- Built: 1931
- Architect: Multiple
- Architectural style: Spanish Colonial Revival, Bungalow/American Craftsman
- NRHP reference No.: 83001107
- Added to NRHP: August 19, 1983

Boulder City Historic District, is Nevada's largest listing on the National Register of Historic Places with 514 buildings. Among the buildings, 408 constructions were built during the first 11 years (from 1931 to 1942). Between World War II and 1950, 66 buildings were built; the rest 40 were constructed after 1950.

Boulder City, Clark county, southeastern Nevada, U.S. is situated by the Hoover Dam. The only reason for its existence was the requirement of housing the employees hired to build the Hoover Dam on the Colorado River. At the time of construction of the Dam, Boulder City sheltered more than 4,000 employees in 1500 buildings from 1931 to 1935.

== Design ==
The town was designed and built by the U.S. Bureau of Reclamation and the Six Companies to support the construction of Hoover Dam between 1931 and 1935. The chief planner was Saco Rienk DeBoer. The town center is unified by the consistent use of the Spanish Colonial Revival style of architecture.

== History and context ==
On December 21, 1928, President Calvin Coolidge signed the Boulder Canyon Project Act approving the construction of Hoover Dam and the formation of Boulder City. Afterwards, on March 11, 1931, Six Companies, Inc., a company made up of 6 different construction companies, was offered the contract to build the dam. Boulder City was constructed for housing the workers who came to work on the dam. As the earliest developed experiment in new town planning in the 20th Century, Boulder City holds national significance. The federal government owned the site. All land was preserved by the federal government under the Bureau of Reclamation.

The Boulder Canyon Project Federal Reservation as well as the federal rangers obeyed law and order on the reservation and that is why Boulder City was constructed. Around 1931–32, the Bureau of Reclamation and Six Companies, Inc. constructed the housing in Boulder City for their department heads, engineers, and employees on the dam. Permits started to be issued by Sims Ely (city manager) for building commercial buildings in the city from 1931. During 1932, the sight of north on Nevada Way towards the Bureau of Reclamation Building on the hill was quite similar to that of today. The management skills of Frank T. Crowe who was one of the most competent construction engineers to work in Reclamation caused the earlier completion of the dam in 1936, 22 months ahead of schedule.
