= Edmund Wattis Littlefield =

Edmund Wattis Littlefield (1914–2001) was an American businessman, philanthropist, and member of the Bohemian Club.

== Biography ==
Littlefield was the grandson of Edmund Orson Wattis Jr., one of the founders of Utah Construction Company. Littlefield started his business career as a water boy for the Utah Construction Company. He received an undergraduate degree in 1936 and an MBA in 1938 from Stanford University. During World War II, he served as an officer in the U.S. Navy and an analyst on petroleum supplies for the war effort.

In 1951, Littlefield returned to Utah Construction Company as the vice president of finance. He became the general manager and principal officer of Utah Construction Company in 1958. Under his leadership, Utah Construction Company became the most profitable mining and land development company in the United States in the 1960s, and in 1976 merged with GE in the largest corporate merger at that time. The merger and subsequent appreciation of GE stock gave Littlefield a ranking on the Forbes 400 list of wealthiest Americans with a net worth of $2.3 billion in 2001.

Littlefield served on the boards of some of the largest corporations in the US, including GE, Bechtel Investment, Chrysler, Del Monte, Hewlett-Packard and Wells Fargo Bank. He served as Chairman of The Business Council in 1975 and 1976. His system for organizing correspondence and his "to do" list was described by neuroscientist Daniel J. Levitin, who worked as his executive assistant in the 1980s, in his book The Organized Mind.

As a philanthropist, Littlefield financially supported the building of the Edmund W. Littlefield Center, which houses the Stanford Business School faculty and classrooms.

=== Awards and honors ===
In 1997 the U.S. Navy Memorial Foundation awarded Littlefield its Lone Sailor Award for his naval service.
