= Thomas N. Taylor =

American Mormon bishop (1868–1950)

Thomas Nicholls Taylor (July 28, 1868 – October 24, 1950) was an American businessman, politician and civic and religious leader. He was mayor of Provo, Utah, from 1900 to 1903.

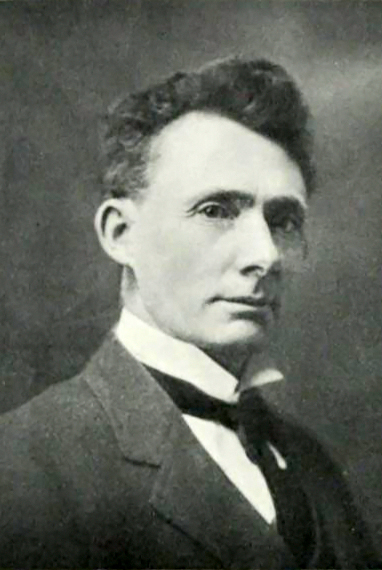
Thomas N. Taylor 1913

Taylor was born in Provo, Utah, to George Taylor Sr. and his wife Eliza Nicholls. George Taylor Sr. was involved in multiple business ventures in Provo. Thomas Taylor attended Brigham Young Academy, taking classes with men such as Karl G. Maeser. He left school in 1885 and went into business. In that year he and Julius Jensen founded a jewelry shop in Provo. They operated out of the same building as George Taylor Sr.'s Taylor Furniture Company. In 1890, Taylor became manager of the Taylor Brothers Business, the furniture business that his father had previously owned, and he was general manager of the business until his death. He also served as a member of the board of directors of the Provo Building and Loan Company, Beneficial Life Insurance Company and the Home Fire Insurance Company of Utah. He was also a director of the Provo Woolen Mills, the Mapleton Sugar Company and Farmers and Merchants Bank of Provo. He suffered significant losses in all these ventures, especially the bank when it collapsed in 1932 and he along with the other stock holders absorbed the losses to pay off the depositors. Taylor also had a 52-acre farm and orchard in what is now Orem, Utah.

Taylor served as a bishop in the Church of Jesus Christ of Latter-day Saints (LDS Church), presiding over the Provo 3rd Ward for 19 years. He was president of the Utah Stake, consisting of the City of Provo, from 1919 to 1939. From 1939 until his death he was the patriarch of the Provo Stake.

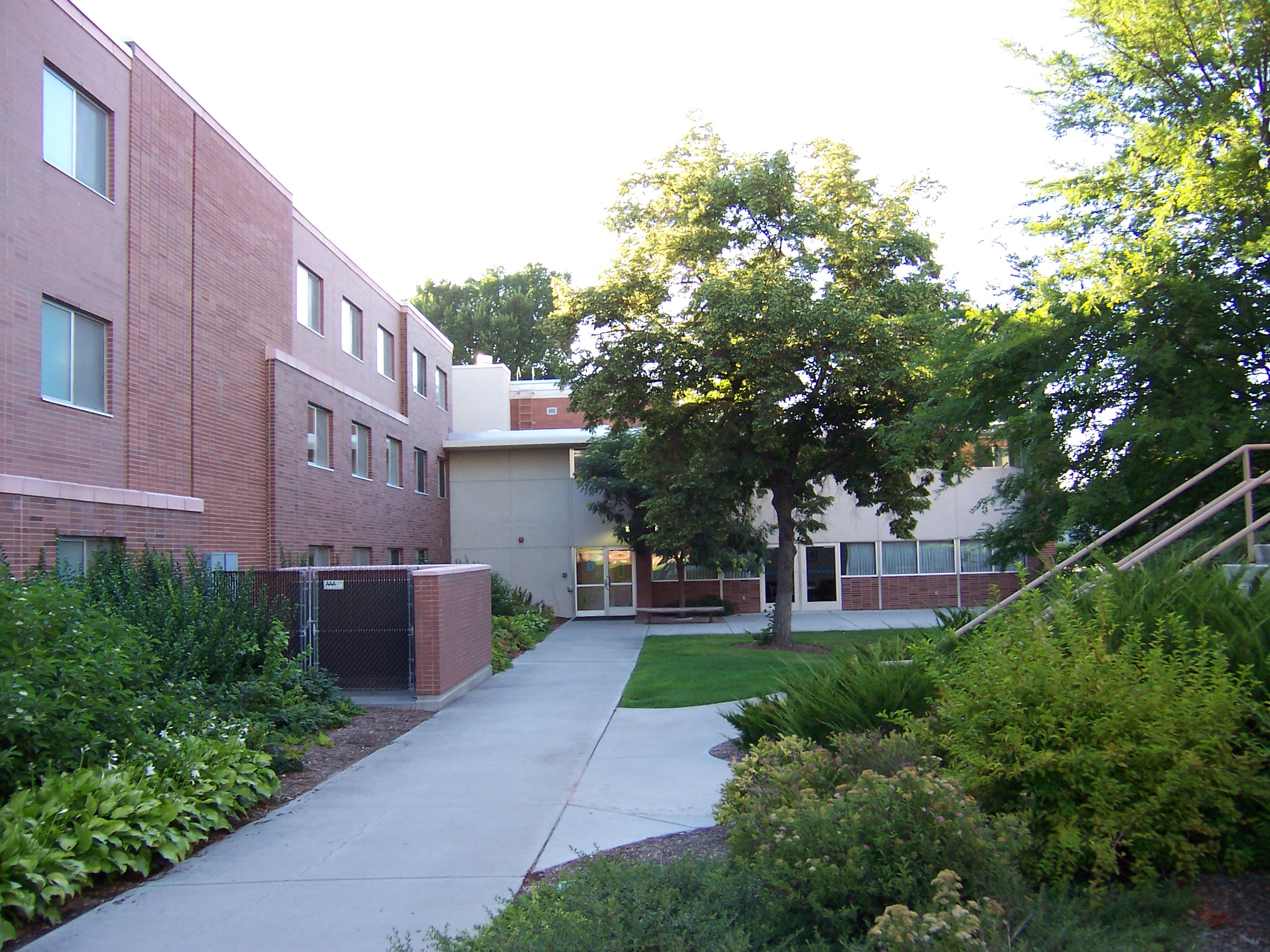
Taylor Hall, located at BYU

Taylor ran as the Democratic candidate for Governor of Utah in 1920, losing the general election to Charles R. Mabey. He was a member of the Brigham Young University (BYU) Board of Trustees from 1921 to 1939 and chairman of the boards executive committee and vice president of the board for much of the time.

Taylor married Maud Rogers in 1889 in the Manti Temple. They were the parents of nine children.

Thomas N. Taylor House in Provo is listed on the National Register of Historic Places. Taylor Hall in Helaman Halls, a dormitory complex at BYU, is named for Taylor.

Party political offices
Preceded by Simon Bamberger	Democratic nominee for Governor of Utah; 1920	Succeeded by George Dern
