= Francis Crowe Society =

University of Maine Honor society

The Francis Crowe Society is an honor society intended to recognise the graduates of the University of Maine's College of Engineering.

The society was founded in the fall of 2000 by Dean Larryl Matthews and named in honor of Francis T. Crowe, a Civil Engineer of the University's class of 1905 who designed 19 of the 'super-dams' in the Western United States that made farming possible in the Great Basin, the California Central Valley, Central Arizona and the Imperial Valley. Each graduate from the College of Engineering is invited to join and each department has the opportunity to nominate a distinguished engineer (generally an alumnus or senior member of the college but not necessarily so) for induction. These recipients are engineers who have distinguished themselves in their field of study and their induction is intended to serve as a role model to the new graduates. Generally the title 'Distinguished Engineer' (or Inductee) is reserved for alumni while non-alumni are named as 'Honorary Members'.

Note that if you visit the Hoover Dam, Francis Crowe's name does not appear on the plaque commemorating the engineers, politicians and other major players.

== Notable Society Members ==
- John Glenn, Honorary Member, Astronaut, Senator, Engineer, Inducted Spring 2001
