= Edmund Orson Wattis Jr. =

American businessman (1855–1934)

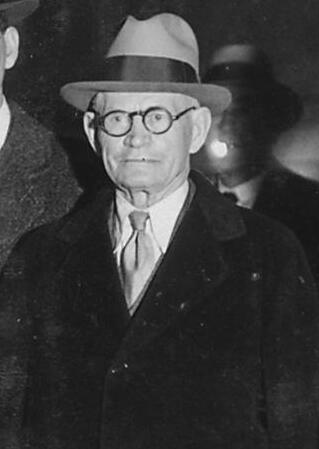
- Wattis inspecting the Boulder Canyon Project (1932)
- Born: March 6, 1855; Uintah, Utah Territory, U.S.
- Died: February 3, 1934 (aged 78); Ogden, Utah, U.S.
- Resting place: Ogden City Cemetery
- Spouse: Martha Ann Bybee (m. 1879)
- Children: 8
- Relatives: William H. Wattis (brother)

Edmund Orson Wattis Jr. (March 6, 1855 – February 3, 1934), was oldest of the brothers who founded Wattis Brothers and the Utah Construction Company.

== Early life ==
Wattis was born on March 6, 1855, at a farm in Uintah, Utah Territory, the second of seven children born to Edmund Orson Wattis and Mary Jane Corey. Edmund was 21 when he left his home in Uinta to start a career in heavy construction, working on bed grading for the Canadian Pacific and Colorado Midlands.

== Railway contractors ==
With his brother William, he formed a firm to lay track for the expanding railroads. Wattis Brothers prospered until the Panic of 1893. While William continued to try to find construction projects, Edmund focused his energies on running a sheep ranch the brothers had established in the Weber Valley. This ranch would later provide the financial strength for the large construction projects to come.

In 1900, the Wattis Brothers again tried their hand as partners in contracting. They founded the Utah Construction Company. A short four years after its founding, Utah Construction Company was awarded the contract to build the Feather River route between Oakland and Salt Lake City. This $60 million contract was challenging, but after five years, very profitable. The Feather River route was complete for the Western Pacific Railroad in 1911. The Utah Construction Company thrived, and soon captured a large share of the tunneling, grading, and track projects in the rapidly expanding railroads in the mountain west. Seeing the end of railroad expansion, the Wattis Brothers looked for ways to diversify their construction risks.

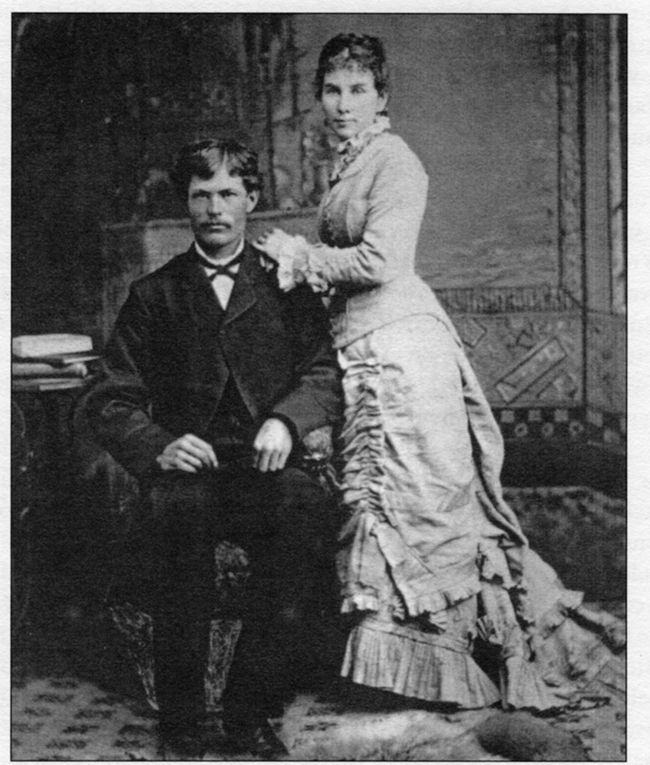
Edmund O. Wattis and Martha Ann Bybee on their wedding day, June 25, 1879

Edmund Wattis married Martha Ann Bybee on June 25, 1879. They had five daughters and three sons.

In 1917, Utah Construction Company was awarded the seven million dollar O'Shaughnessy Dam contract, a controversial project that impounds the Tuolumne River in the Hetch Hetchy Valley of California's Sierra Nevada mountains. Success with the O'Shaughnessy Dam convinced the Wattis Brothers to bid on more dam projects. In 1922, Utah Construction Company formed a partnership with the Morrison-Knudsen Company of Boise, Idaho. With Frank Crowe as the chief engineer, the MK UC partnership successfully built dams throughout the American west.

In 1931, the Wattis Brothers spearheaded the formation of Six Companies to build the Hoover Dam which was the largest construction project ever tackled by the US Government up to the time. He did not live to see it completed though; after serving as chairman of Six Companies, E.O. Wattis died in his Ogden, Utah home on February 3, 1934, of a heart attack. He was buried at Ogden City Cemetery.

== Sources ==
- Sessions, Gene A & Sterling D. Utah International, A Biography of a business. ISBN 0-9722102-0-2
- Stevens, Joeseph E. (1988). Hoover Dam, An American Adventure. ISBN 0-8061-2115-7
