= Construction of the Cheyenne Mountain Complex =

External image
- construction scaffolding

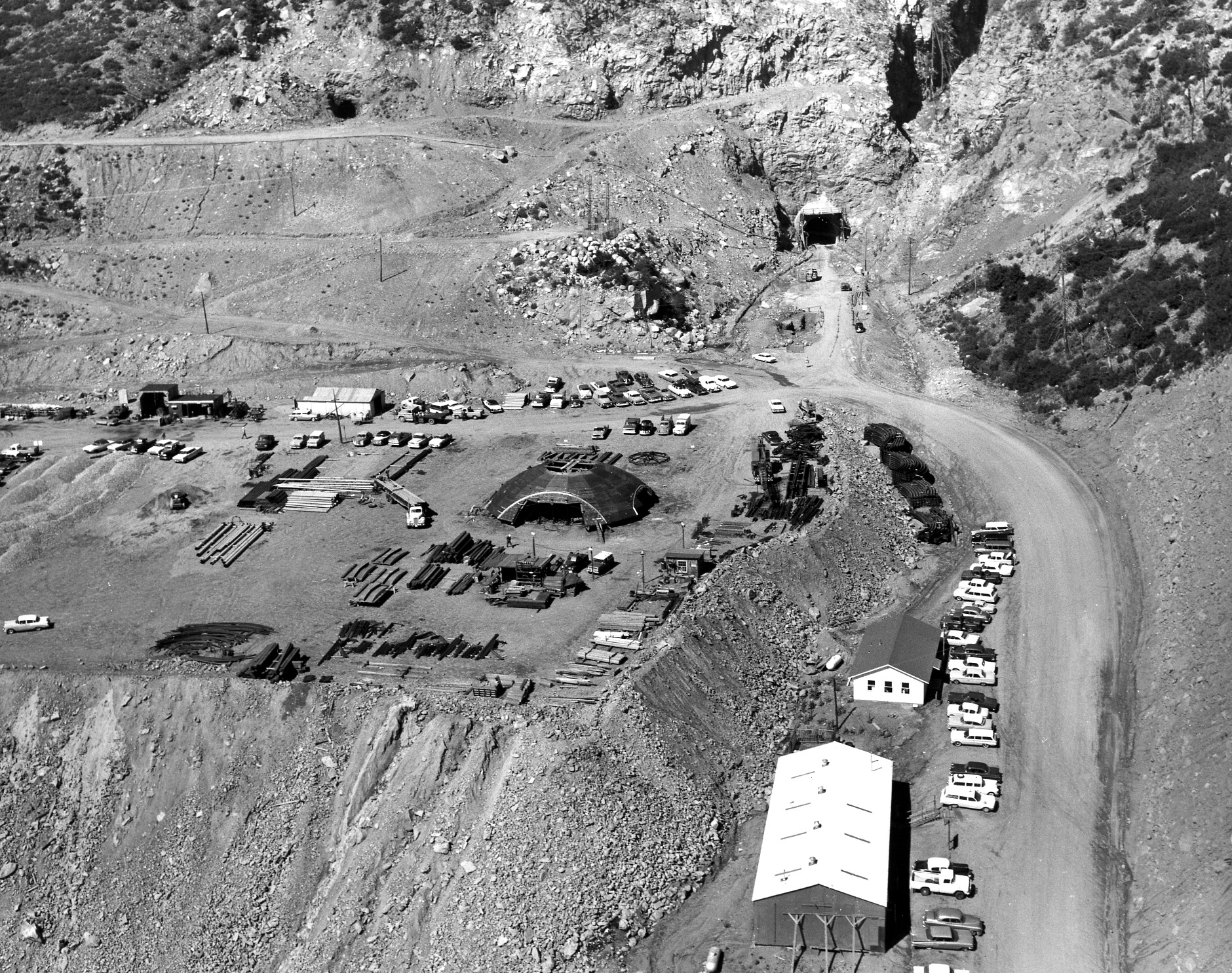
Aerial view of Cheyenne Mountain excavation and construction area in 1963

Construction of the Cheyenne Mountain Complex began with the excavation of Cheyenne Mountain in Colorado Springs, Colorado on May 18, 1961. It was made fully operational on February 6, 1967. It is a military installation and hardened nuclear bunker from which the North American Aerospace Defense Command was headquartered at the Cheyenne Mountain Complex. The United States Air Force has had a presence at the complex since the beginning, the facility is now the Cheyenne Mountain Space Force Station, which hosts other military units, including NORAD.

== Initial planning ==
From the beginning of the Cold War, American defense experts and political leaders began planning and implementing a defensive air shield, which they believed was necessary to defend against a possible attack by long-range, manned Soviet bombers. The Air Defense Command was transferred to Colorado Springs' Ent Air Force Base on January 8, 1951. (Note: The Air Defense Command (ADC) inherited 21 fighter squadrons from Continental Air Command (CONAD) and 37 Air National Guard (ANG) fighter squadrons assigned an M-Day air defense mission. It was also assigned four air defence divisions. General Benjamin W. Chidlaw was the base commander beginning July 29, 1951 and commander of the Air Defense Command from August 25, 1951 and until May 31, 1955.) Starting September 1953, the base was the headquarters for the U.S. Army Anti-Aircraft Command. (Note: Information about potential hostile aircraft from radar sites around the country was forwarded to a regional clearinghouse, like Otis Air National Guard Base, and then to ADC headquarters at Ent Air Force Base. It was then plotted on the world's largest Plexiglas board. Enemy bombers progress was tracked on the board using grease pencils. If there was a potential threat, interceptor aircraft were scrambled to the target. Because this process was cumbersome, it made a rapid response unattainable. An automated command and control system, Semi-Automatic Ground Environment (SAGE), based upon the Whirlwind II (AN/FSQ-7) computer was implemented to process ground radar and other sources for an immediate view of potential threats in the 1950s. There was an operational plan for a SAGE implementation for Ent by March 7, 1955. A modern 15,000 square feet (1,400 m^{2}) concrete block Combat Operations Center (COC) became operational at the base on May 15, 1954. Although the new facility was much improved over the previous center, General Partridge was not satisfied that it would survive a nuclear bomb. September 1 of that year, the Continental Air Defense Command (CONAD) was activated as a joint command of the defense forces of the military branches at the Ent Air Force Base.)

The North American Air Defense Command (NORAD) was established and activated at the Ent Air Force Base on September 12, 1957. In the late 1950s, a plan was developed to construct a command and control center in a hardened facility as a Cold War defensive strategy against long-range Soviet bombers, ballistic missiles, and a nuclear attack. (Note: The Gaither Report, for instance, called for development of ballistic missile programs, early warning systems, and other defensive strategies.)

The Operational Research Society published scientific articles at that time, relating to the planning of such a complex, like:

Hankin, B. D. "Communication and Control of Military Forces." Journal of the Operational Research Society 4.4 (1953): 65-68.

Rivett, Berwyn Hugh Patrick. "Underground communications." Journal of the Operational Research Society 4.4 (1953): 61-65.

Eddison, R. T., and D. G. Owen. "Discharging iron ore." Journal of the Operational Research Society 4.3 (1953): 39-50.

It is also interesting to note, that of the commissions charged with the task of investigating these concerns some were based around the Colorado Springs area, near the Broadmoor hotel. The leader of these inquests, members of the Rockefeller family, were also present at its inauguration.

Psychological planning, (known as Aviation Medicine) went into the selection of candidates, which was also related to continuity of government defense programs such as Operation Looking Glass. This is also the same year the MKULTRA program was authorized.

This planning occurred simultaneously with the rollout of Civil Defense programs in 1951, which resulted in the passage of the National Defense Education Act in 1958.

Hardened bunkers were part of a national plan to ensure the continuation of the United States government in the event of nuclear attack. In the Washington, D.C. area alone, there are said to have been 96 hardened bunkers. Other command bunkers built in the 1950s and early 1960s, include Raven Rock Mountain Complex (1953), Mount Weather Emergency Operations Center (1959) in Virginia, and Project Greek Island (Greenbrier). The closest Russian counterpart to the facility is regarded to be Kosvinsky Mountain, finished in early 1996.

== Excavation ==
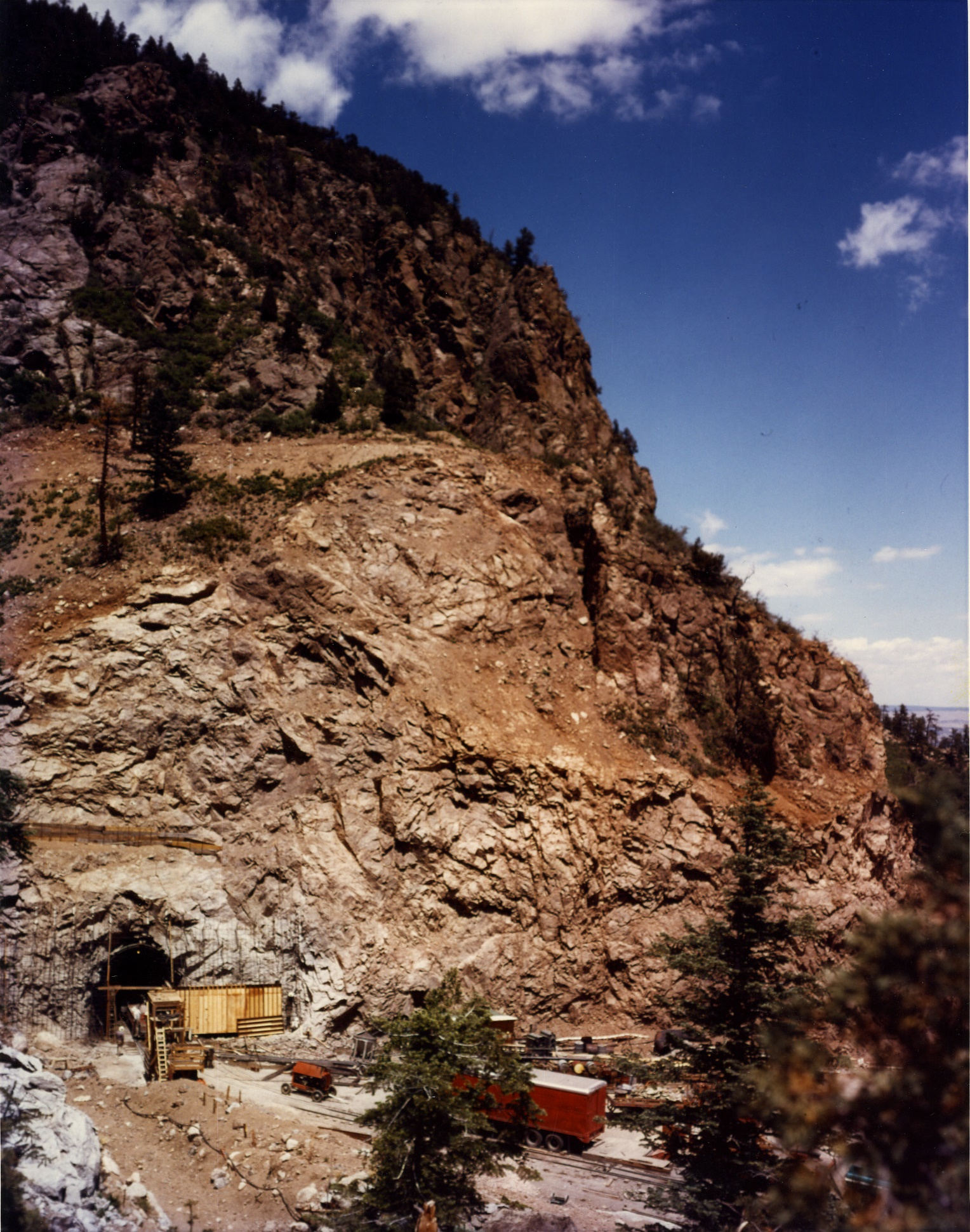
Exterior construction, Cheyenne Mountain complex, 1961

The operations center was moved from an above-ground facility, vulnerable to attack, to the "granite shielded security" within Cheyenne Mountain during the Cold War. In terms of telecommunications capabilities, American Telephone and Telegraph (AT&T) had begun placing its switching stations in hardened underground bunkers during the 1950s.

The mountain was excavated under the supervision of the Army Corps of Engineers for the construction of the NORAD Combat Operations Center. Excavation began for NORAD Command Operations Center (COC) in Cheyenne Mountain on May 18, 1961, by Utah Construction & Mining Company. Clifton W. Livingston of the Colorado School of Mines was hired by the Army Corps of Engineers to consult upon use of controlled blasting for smooth-wall blasting techniques.

The official ground breaking ceremony was held June 16, 1961 at the construction site of the new NORAD Combat Operations Center. Generals Lee (ADC) and Laurence S. Kuter (NORAD) simultaneously set off symbolic dynamite charges. On December 20, 1961, with excavation 53% complete there were 200 workers that walked off on what Cecil Welton, Utah Construction Company project manager, called a wildcat strike after a worker was fired for disobeying safety rules. Workers returned three days later and the fired worker was returned to his position.

Excavation was nearly complete in August 1962, but a geological fault in the ceiling of one of the intersections needed to be reinforced with a $2.7 million massive concrete dome. President John F. Kennedy visited NORAD at the Chidlaw Building on June 5, 1963, to obtain a briefing on the status of the Cheyenne Mountain Complex. Excavation was complete on May 1, 1964.

On September 24, 1964, the Secretary of Defense approved the proposal for the underground Combat Operations Center construction and the Space Defense Center. The targeted date for turnover of the military-staffed facility to the Commander of NORAD was January 1, 1966.

== Construction ==
The architectural design was primarily created by Parsons Brinckerhoff Company. Estimated cost of the combat operations center construction and equipment was $66 million. (Note: The Headquarters NORAD Locations were: Ent Air Force Base, CO September 1957 – March 1963; Chidlaw Building, Colorado Springs, CO March 1963 – January 1988; Building 1470, Peterson Air Force Base, CO January 1988 – March 2003; Building 2, Peterson Air Force Base, CO March 2003 – October 2012; Eberhart-Findley Building, Peterson Air Force Base, CO (ex-Building 2) Beginning October 2012.) The complex was built in the mid-1960s.

Continental Consolidated Construction was awarded a $6,969,000 contract on February 27, 1963, to build 11 buildings on giant springs, with a total of 170,000 square feet (16,000 m^{2}). Eight three-story buildings were built in the main chambers and three two-story buildings were constructed in the support area. Grafe-Wallace, Inc. and J. M. Foster Co. received a joint contract in April 1964 for $7,212,033 contract for blast-control equipment and utilities installation, including the original six 956-kilowatt diesel powered generators. Continental Consolidated also excavated water and fuel oil reservoirs within the interior of the Cheyenne Mountain facility. Continental Consolidated was paid an additional $106,000 for work on the reservoirs.

Beginning in 1965, the NORAD Combat Operations Center was connected through several remote locations to the national telecommunications systems via Bell Laboratories' Close-in Automatic Route Restoral System (CARRS), a "Blast-resistant" communication system constructed hundreds of feet underneath solid granite. Having several remote locations, from 30 to 120 miles from the Cheyenne Mountain Complex, allowed for several different, automatically rerouted pathways to relay data, teletype, and voice communications. The Ballistic Missile Early Warning System (BMEWS) and Distant Early Warning Line (DEW) sites in North America, United Kingdom, and Greenland sent incoming information through the system to the Combat Operations Center.

== Systems installations ==
Burroughs Corporation developed a command and control system for NORAD's Combat Operations Center for the underground facility and the Federal Building in downtown Colorado Springs. The electronics and communications system centralized and automated the instantaneous (one-millionth of a second) evaluation of aerospace surveillance data. The Air Defense Command's SPACETRACK Center and NORAD's Space Detection and Tracking System (SPADATS) Center merged to form the Space Defense Center. It was moved from Ent AFB to the newly completed Cheyenne Mountain Combat Operations Center and was activated on September 3, 1965. The Electronic Systems Division (ESD) turned the facility's Combat Operations Center over to NORAD on January 1, 1966. The Commander of NORAD transferred Combat Operations Center operations from Ent Air Force Base to Cheyenne Mountain and declared the 425L command and control system fully operational April 20, 1966. (Note: On May 7, 1965 a Philco 212 Computer was installed for the 425L Command/Control and Missile Warning system.) The Space Defense Command's 1st Aerospace Control Squadron moved from Ent AFB to Cheyenne Mountain in April 1966.

On May 20, 1966, the NORAD Attack Warning System became operational. The Combat Operations Command was fully operational on July 1, 1966. The $5 million Delta I computer system, one of the largest computer program systems of the Electronic Systems Division, became operational on October 28, 1966. With 53 different programs, it was a defense against space systems by detecting and warning of space threats, which involved recording and monitoring every detected space system. By January 4, 1967, the National Civil Defense Warning Center was in the bunker. The Space Defense Center and the Combat Operations Center achieved Full Operational Capability on February 6, 1967. The total cost was $142.4 million or $1,075,017,676.65 in 2018 value.

== See also ==
- Fortification
- Underground construction
