= 1928 Utah gubernatorial election =

- November 6, 1928
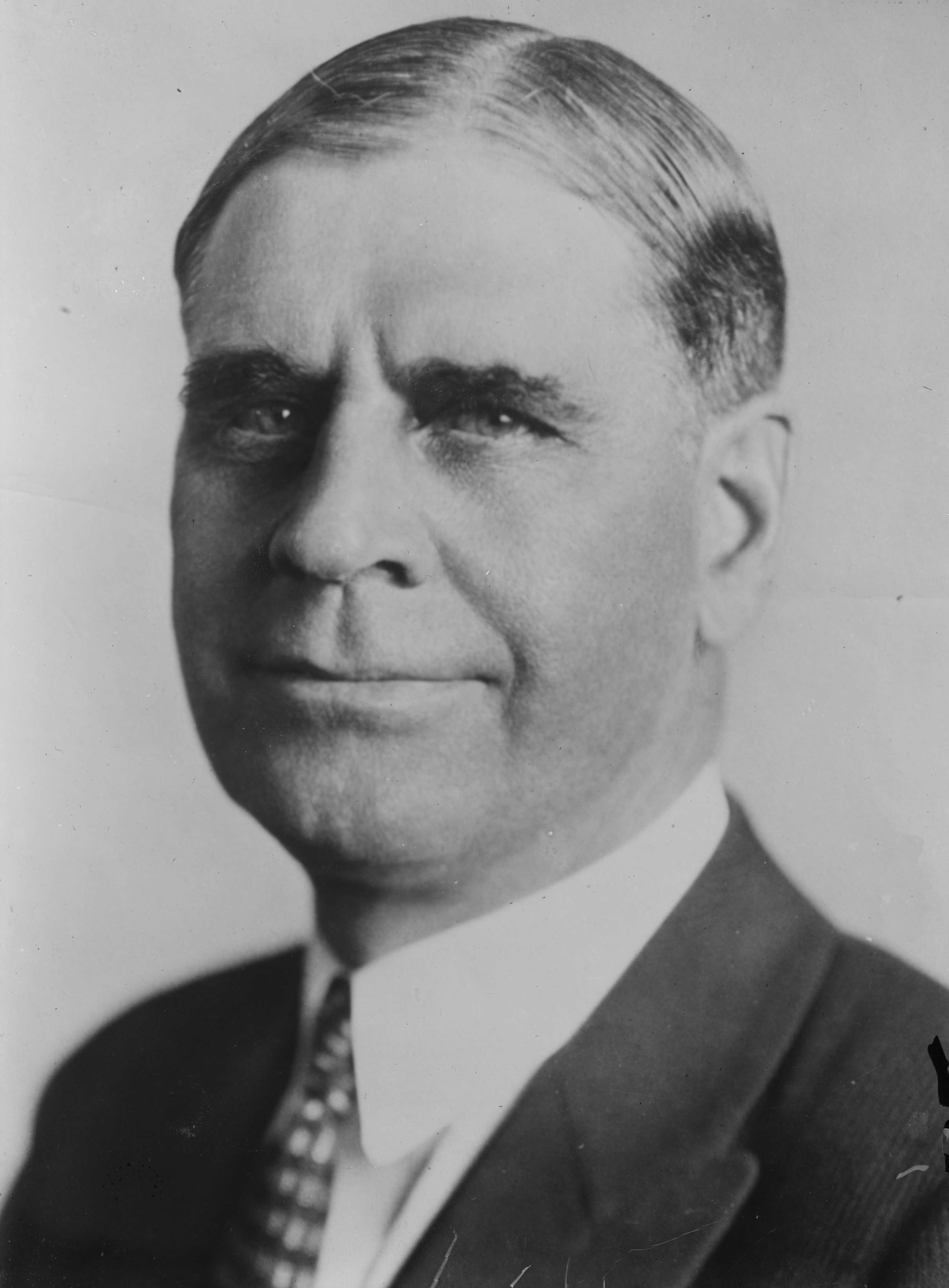

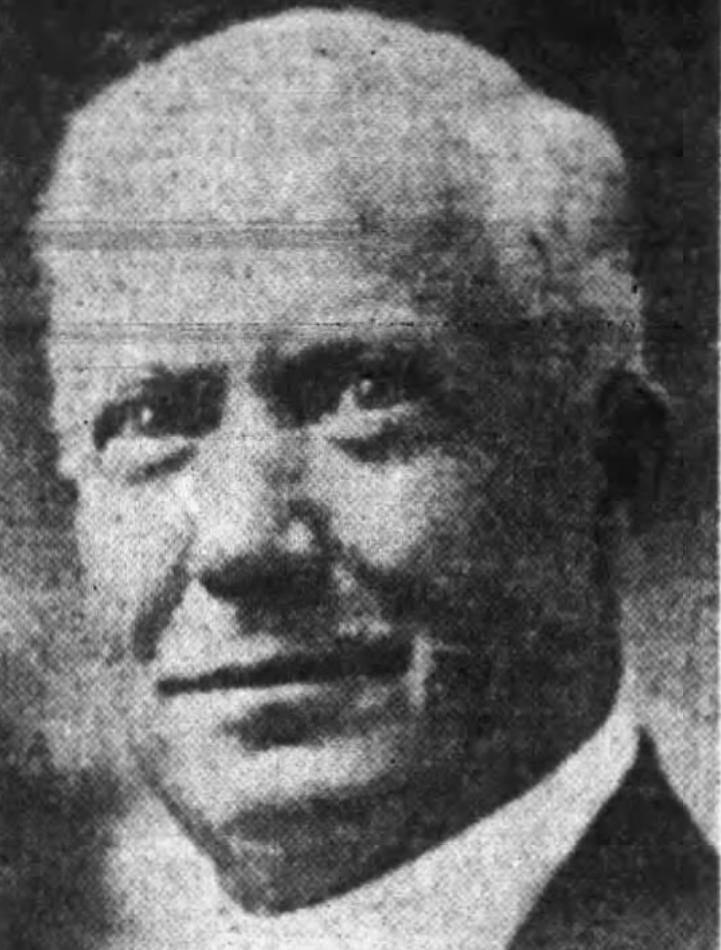
Nominee	George Dern	William H. Wattis
Party	Democratic	Republican
Popular vote	102,953	72,306
Percentage	58.50%	41.08%
- County results Dern: 50–60% 60–70% Wattis: 50–60% 60–70%
Governor before election
George Dern
Democratic
Elected Governor
George Dern
Democratic

The 1928 Utah gubernatorial election was held on November 6, 1928. Incumbent Democrat George Dern defeated Republican nominee William H. Wattis with 58.50% of the vote.

== General election ==
=== Candidates ===
Major party candidates

- George Dern, Democratic
- William H. Wattis, Republican

Other candidates

- D. C. Dora, Socialist

=== Results ===
1928 Utah gubernatorial election
Party	Candidate	Votes	%	±%
Democratic	George Dern (incumbent)	102,953	58.50%	+5.50%
Republican	William H. Wattis	72,306	41.08%	−5.92%
Socialist	D. C. Dora	740	0.42%	
Total votes		175,999	100.00%	
Majority		30,647	17.41%	
Democratic hold		Swing	+11.43%	

=== Results by county ===
County	George Dern Democratic		William H. Wattis Republican		D. C. Dora Socialist		Margin		Total votes cast
County	#	%	#	%	#	%	#	%	Total votes cast
Beaver	1,105	53.10%	971	46.66%	5	0.24%	134	6.44%	2,081
Box Elder	3,264	56.17%	2,530	43.54%	17	0.29%	734	12.63%	5,811
Cache	5,927	58.93%	4,116	40.93%	14	0.14%	1,811	18.01%	10,057
Carbon	3,261	63.51%	1,840	35.83%	34	0.66%	1,421	27.67%	5,135
Daggett	44	31.88%	94	68.12%	0	0.00%	-50	-36.23%	138
Davis	2,819	58.93%	1,953	40.82%	12	0.25%	866	18.10%	4,784
Duchesne	1,291	51.81%	1,191	47.79%	10	0.40%	100	4.01%	2,492
Emery	1,003	43.82%	1,267	55.35%	19	0.83%	-264	-11.53%	2,289
Garfield	505	37.32%	846	62.53%	2	0.15%	-341	-25.20%	1,353
Grand	401	60.39%	260	39.16%	3	0.45%	141	21.23%	664
Iron	1,152	45.82%	1,344	53.46%	18	0.72%	-192	-7.64%	2,514
Juab	2,062	63.04%	1,203	36.78%	6	0.18%	859	26.26%	3,271
Kane	311	44.43%	388	55.43%	1	0.14%	-77	-11.00%	700
Millard	1,983	53.22%	1,730	46.43%	13	0.35%	253	6.79%	3,726
Morgan	550	57.05%	413	42.84%	1	0.10%	137	14.21%	964
Piute	302	45.07%	365	54.48%	3	0.45%	-63	-9.40%	670
Rich	325	47.24%	363	52.76%	0	0.00%	-38	-5.52%	688
Salt Lake	45,082	65.65%	23,283	33.90%	308	0.45%	21,799	31.74%	68,673
San Juan	349	51.47%	326	48.08%	3	0.44%	23	3.39%	678
Sanpete	3,088	50.11%	3,061	49.67%	14	0.23%	27	0.44%	6,163
Sevier	1,812	47.31%	2,011	52.51%	7	0.18%	-199	-5.20%	3,830
Summit	1,640	54.32%	1,361	45.08%	18	0.60%	279	9.24%	3,019
Tooele	1,763	56.27%	1,351	43.12%	19	0.61%	412	13.15%	3,133
Uintah	1,223	49.31%	1,247	50.28%	10	0.40%	-24	-0.97%	2,480
Utah	10,266	61.42%	6,392	38.24%	56	0.34%	3,874	23.18%	16,714
Wasatch	1,242	53.49%	1,076	46.34%	4	0.17%	166	7.15%	2,322
Washington	1,237	49.07%	1,281	50.81%	3	0.12%	-44	-1.75%	2,521
Wayne	274	44.48%	340	55.19%	2	0.32%	-66	-10.71%	616
Weber	8,672	46.84%	9,703	52.41%	138	0.75%	-1,031	-5.57%	18,513
Total	102,953	58.50%	72,306	41.08%	740	0.42%	30,647	17.41%	175,999

==== Counties that flipped from Republican to Democratic ====
- Beaver
- Box Elder
- Cache
- Davis
- Duchesne
- Millard
- Morgan
- San Juan
- Sanpete
- Summit
- Utah

==== Counties that flipped from Democratic to Republican ====
- Emery
- Sevier
- Weber
