= Holt-Dern process =

Silver and gold refining method

The Holt-Dern process is a method by which silver and gold can be extracted from low-grade ores.

The method was applied in mining at Park City, Utah, and in the Tintic Mining District at the Tintic Smelter Site. It was named for George Dern and T.P. Holt.
