= Lone Sailor Award =

United States Navy award

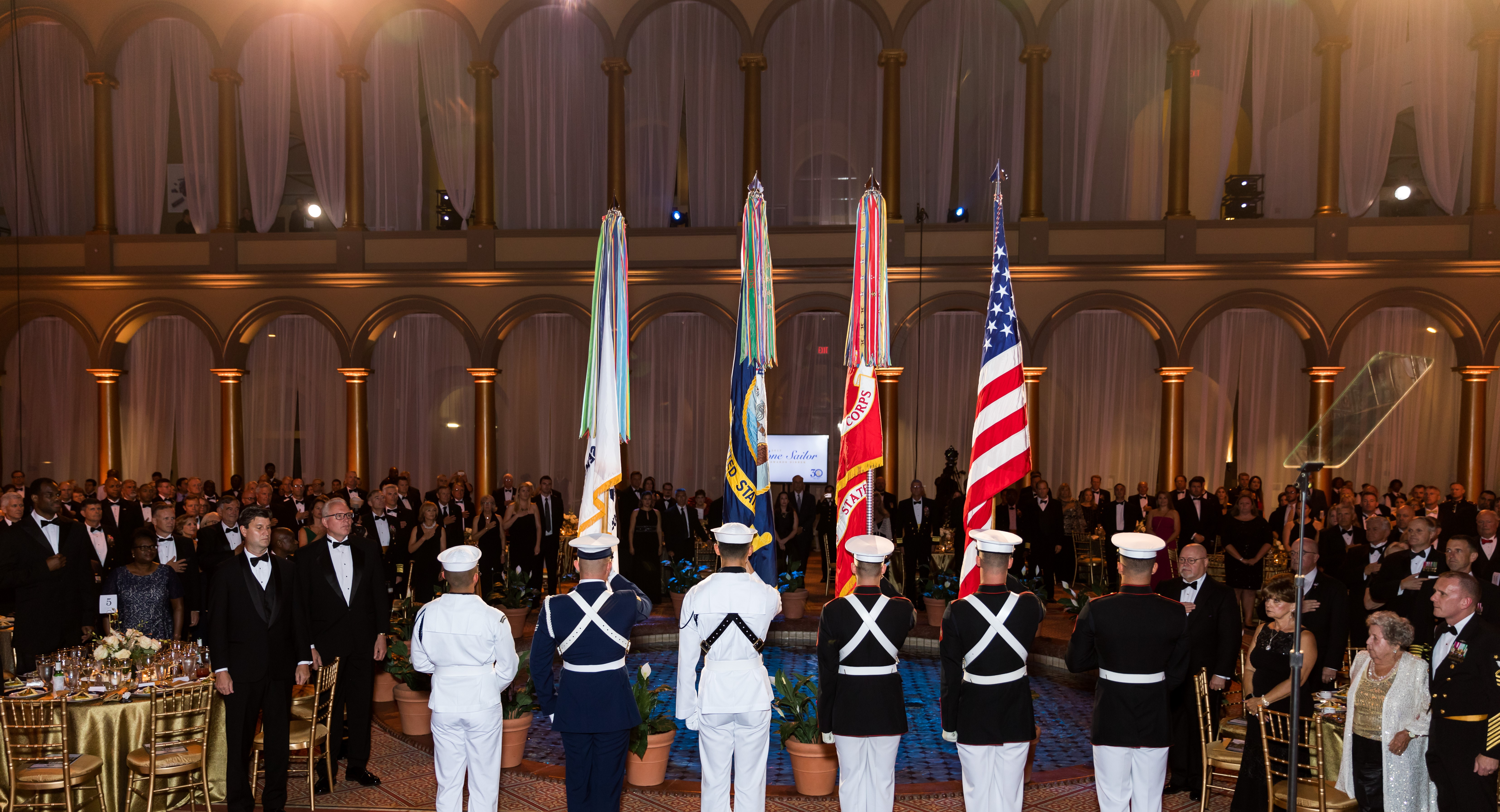
2017 Lone Sailor Awards Dinner

The United States Navy Memorial presents a Lone Sailor Award to Sea Service veterans who have excelled with distinction in their respective careers during or after their service. The award recipients will join a list of men and women who have distinguished themselves by drawing upon their military experience to become successful in their subsequent careers and lives, while exemplifying the core values of Honor, Courage and Commitment. The Lone Sailor Award has been given out each year since the Navy Memorial was dedicated in 1987.

The Lone Sailor Awards Dinner is an annual gala hosted by the Navy Memorial to Honor, Recognize and Celebrate its constituents and award recipients.

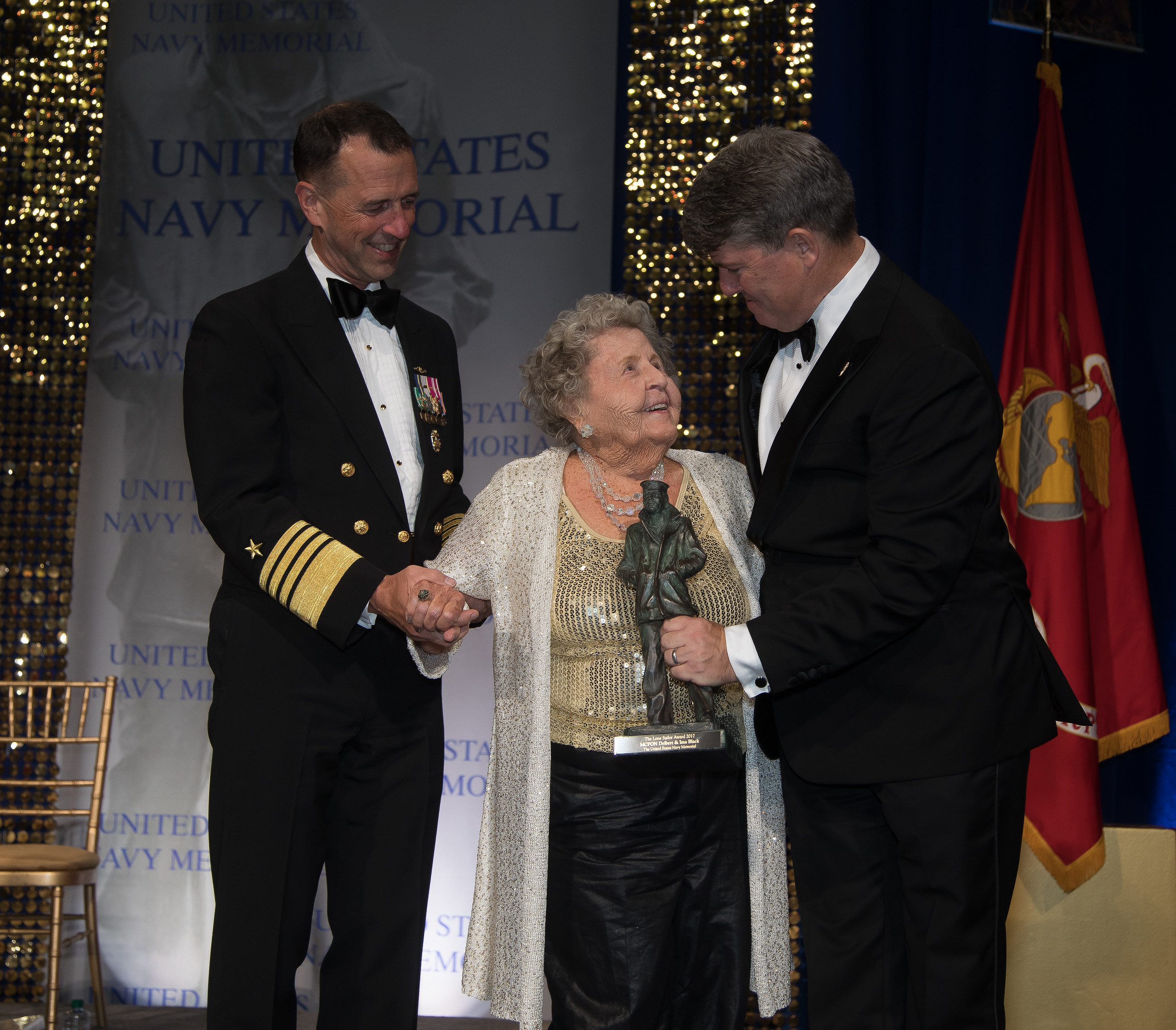
CNO Richardson and Rear Admiral Frank Thorp IV, USN (Ret.), President & CEO of the Navy Memorial, honoring Ima Black and her late husband Delbert D. Black, the first Master Chief Petty Officer of the Navy, at the 2017 Lone Sailor Awards Dinner

The ceremony is held in September of each year at the National Building Museum in Washington, D.C.

The United States Navy Memorial also issues a corresponding award known as the Naval Heritage Award, issued to those who were not veterans of Sea Services, but have done outstanding work to support the Sea Services and displayed the same values of Lone Sailor Award recipients in their lives.

== Lone Sailor Award honorees ==
(An * denotes a posthumous recipient)

=== 2025 ===
- James G. Stavridis (Admiral and Chair of the board of trustees of the Rockefeller Foundation
- Charles Sams (former director of the National Park Service

=== 2024 ===
- Master Chief Special Warfare Operator (SEAL) Edward C. Byers JR. (Medal of Honor Recipient)
- Jack O. Bovender Jr. (Former Chairman and CEO of Hospital Corporation of America)

=== 2023 ===
- Robert "Bob" Work (32nd US Deputy Secretary of Defense)
- U.S. Navy Master Chief William Goines (first African-American Navy Seal)

=== 2022 ===
- James Rex Barker
- Admiral Thomas “Tom” B. Fargo

=== 2021 ===
- Drew Carey
- U.S. Senate Chaplain Barry Black

=== 2020 ===
- Bill Withers
- James Mattis

=== 2019 ===
- Dr. Jack London
- Paul Galanti

=== 2018 ===
- Harvey Barnum, Jr.
- William Hannigan
- Robert E. Naser*

=== 2017 ===
- Christopher Gardner
- Delbert* & Ima Black
- David Robinson

=== 2016 ===
- Daniel D’Aniello
- Senator John H. Glenn, Jr.
- Rear Admiral Robert H. Shumaker
- John P. Cosgrove

=== 2015 ===
- Admiral James S. Gracey
- J. William Middendorf II
- Robert S. Morrison
- C. Michael Petters

=== 2014 ===
- Honorable Samuel A. Nunn, Jr.
- James A. Skinner
- Robert J. Stevens

=== 2013 ===
- Daniel Akerson
- General Paul X. Kelley
- Ted Turner

=== 2012 ===
- Everett Alvarez, Jr.
- John Paul DeJoria
- J. David Power III
- Mark Russell

=== 2011 ===
- Lloyd V. "Beau" Bridges III
- Jeffrey L. Bridges
- Lloyd V. Bridges, Jr.*
- Gerald F. "Jerry" Coleman
- Robert W.A. Feller*
- Brian P. Lamb

=== 2010 ===
- Lanier W. Phillips
- Edward W. Lebaron, Jr.
- ~~Bill Cosby~~ (award revoked in 2014)

=== 2009 ===
- Lawrence P. "Yogi" Berra
- Leonard A. Lauder
- Frederick W. Smith

=== 2008 ===
- A.G. Lafley
- John H. McConnell*
- Arnold Palmer

=== 2007 ===
- Tom Benson
- Morgan L. Fitch, Jr., Esq.
- Stan Musial
- Senator John W. Warner, Jr.

=== 2006 ===
- Admiral William J. Crowe, Jr.
- Arnold "Red" Auerbach

=== 2005 ===
- Rear Admiral Grace Hopper*
- Senator John McCain

=== 2004 ===
- Benjamin Bradlee
- Admiral Stansfield Turner

=== 2003 ===
- Captain Dan A. Carmichael
- Joseph F. Cullman, III
- Captain James A. Lovell, Jr.

=== 2002 ===
- Gordon M. Bethune
- Honorable Donald H. Rumsfeld
- Representative Floyd D. Spence*
- Representative Bob Stump

=== 2000 ===
- Nickolas Davatzes
- Robert M. Morgenthau
- President Theodore Roosevelt*
- John C. Whitehead

=== 1999 ===
- Charles Francis Adams IV*
- Captain Thomas J. Hudner, Jr.
- President John F. Kennedy*
- Senator John F. Kerry

=== 1998 ===
- Eddie Albert
- Ambassador John Gavin
- Admiral Hyman G. Rickover*
- Esther L. Snyder

=== 1997 ===
- Ernest Borgnine
- Captain Winifred Quick Collins
- Senator Robert Kerrey
- Austin H. Kiplinger
- Edmund W. Littlefield
- Henry Trione
- Jonathan Winters

=== 1996 ===
- Dr. Robert Ballard
- Roger T. Staubach
- Dr. Kathryn Sullivan

=== 1995 ===
- President Richard M. Nixon*

=== 1994 ===
- Tony Curtis
- Senator Daniel Patrick Moynihan
- Admiral E.R. Zumwalt, Jr.

=== 1993 ===
- James A. Michener
- Allen E. Murray
- Harold A. Poling
- Rear Admiral William Thompson

=== 1992 ===
- President Gerald R. Ford
- Honorable H. Lawrence Garrett, III

=== 1991 ===
- Admiral Arleigh Burke
- President George H. W. Bush
- Justice William S. White

=== 1989 ===
- Admiral Thomas H. Moorer

=== 1987 ===
- Herman Wouk

== Naval Heritage Award honorees ==
=== 2023 ===
- U.S. Senator Susan Collins

=== 2022 ===
- Christine H. Fox

=== 2016 ===
- Peter Ho
- Martin A. Kropelnicki

=== 2013 ===
- Senator Kay Bailey Hutchison

=== 2008 ===
- Representative Norm Dicks

=== 2006 ===
- Senator Daniel Inouye

=== 2005 ===
- Representative Ike Skelton

=== 2002 ===
- Clive Cussler

=== 1998 ===
- President Ronald W. Reagan
- John Wayne

=== 1997 ===
- Zachary and Elizabeth Fisher
- Ambassador Paul H. Nitze

=== 1996 ===
- Bob Hope

=== 1995 ===
- Senator Margaret Chase Smith
