= Jack London (businessman) =

American businessman (1937–2021)

Dr. J. Phillip (Jack) London
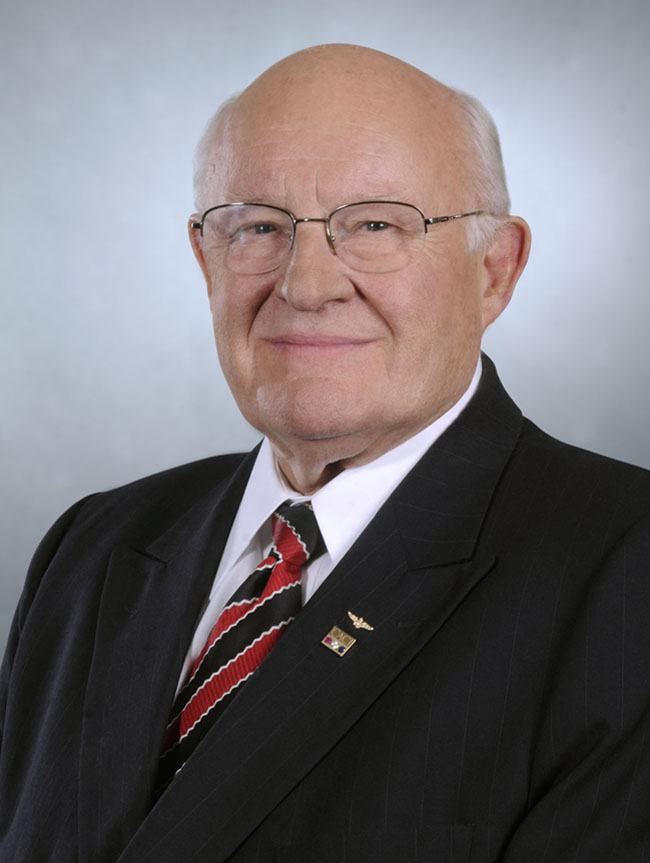
- Born: April 30, 1937; Oklahoma City, OK, U.S.
- Died: January 18, 2021 (aged 83); Arlington, VA
- Education: U.S. Naval Academy (BS); Naval Postgraduate School (MS); George Washington University (DBA)
- Occupations: Businessman & Philanthropist
- Known for: President & CEO, CACI
- Spouse: Dr Jennifer Ellen Burkhart
- Children: 5
- Parent(s): Harry R. and Evalyn P. London
- Military career
- Allegiance: United States
- Branch: United States Navy
- Service years: 1959–1983
- Rank: CAPT
- Units: USS Randolph (CV-15); Naval Material Command; Naval Air Systems Command
- Conflicts: Cold War; Cuban Missile Crisis; Vietnam War
- Awards: Lone Sailor Award

J. Phillip "Jack" London (April 30, 1937 – January 18, 2021) was a US naval engineer and businessman.

London was a 1959 graduate of the U.S. Naval Academy and served as a naval aviator for 12 years during the Cold War and an additional 12 years in the Navy Reserve as an aeronautical engineering duty officer. In 1972, he joined CACI International Inc as a consultant. He became CEO of CACI in 1984. London led the growth of the company as a government information technology contractor for national security missions, electronic warfare and cyber security, with some 20,000 employees in 155 locations worldwide.

He served on the boards of the Navy Memorial Foundation, the Naval Historical Foundation, and the Friends of the National World War II Memorial.

== Early life, education and naval career ==
London was born to Harry R. and Evalyn P. London. His maternal family came from Illinois and Missouri and his father’s family came west from Tennessee and Maryland. A student of history and genealogy, London traced his family lineage back to Samuel Nicholson, a Continental Navy officer during the American Revolution and commanding officer of the USS Constitution, for whom he created the Captain Samuel Nicholson Naval and Marine Corps History and Leadership Award to honor a graduating Naval Academy midshipman in 2014.

London was an honor roll student and student body president of Classen High School in Oklahoma City. Witnessing a halftime demonstration by the Navy Blue Angels at an Oklahoma University football game sparked an interest in naval aviation, and he applied and was accepted to the United States Naval Academy, where he graduated with a B.S. in naval engineering and commissioned as an ensign in the U.S. Navy in 1959. He served as a naval aviator and carrier pilot during which he made 33 deployments in the North Atlantic, the Mediterranean, and the Caribbean with an anti-submarine warfare (ASW) "hunter-killer" unit during the Cold War, including as part of the airborne recovery team for John Glenn's Mercury space flight on Friendship 7, and during the Cuban Missile Crisis aboard the USS Randolph (CV-15) in 1962.

Back on shore duty, London pursued an M.S. in operations research from the Naval Postgraduate School in 1967 and a D.B.A. from George Washington University in 1971.

== CACI ==
London learned computer technology with the Navy and applied his knowledge of naval operations to earn a role at the CACI following his separation from active duty in 1972. He was promoted to a vice president role in 1976 and a seat on the board of directors in 1981. CACI co-founder Herb Karr asked London to take over day-to-day operations as president and CEO in 1984. London oversaw CACI's operational turnaround to profitability and growth, and transitioning with the rapidly changing IT market into the information security and intelligence community arenas.

In an attempt to address accusations that CACI held some responsibility in regard to torture and abuse of prisoners at Abu Ghraib prison during the Iraq War, London authored the book Our Good Name, A Company's Fight to Get the Truth Told About Abu Ghraib. He was also the lead author of Character: The Ultimate Success Factor.

From 2007, he stepped down as CEO but was appointed as executive chairman of the company. In 2018, while chairman of the board of CACI he oversaw the unsuccessful attempted acquisition of General Dynamics into the company.

He died in January 2021 at age 83.

== Honors ==
The Dr. J.P. London Shared Services Center in Oklahoma City was named after him in 2018.

In 2019, he was awarded the Lone Sailor Award.

He was a recipient of the Naval Historical Foundation Distinguished Service Award and the Rodney N. Houghton Award of the National Maritime Historical Society.
