= 1924 Utah gubernatorial election =

- November 4, 1924
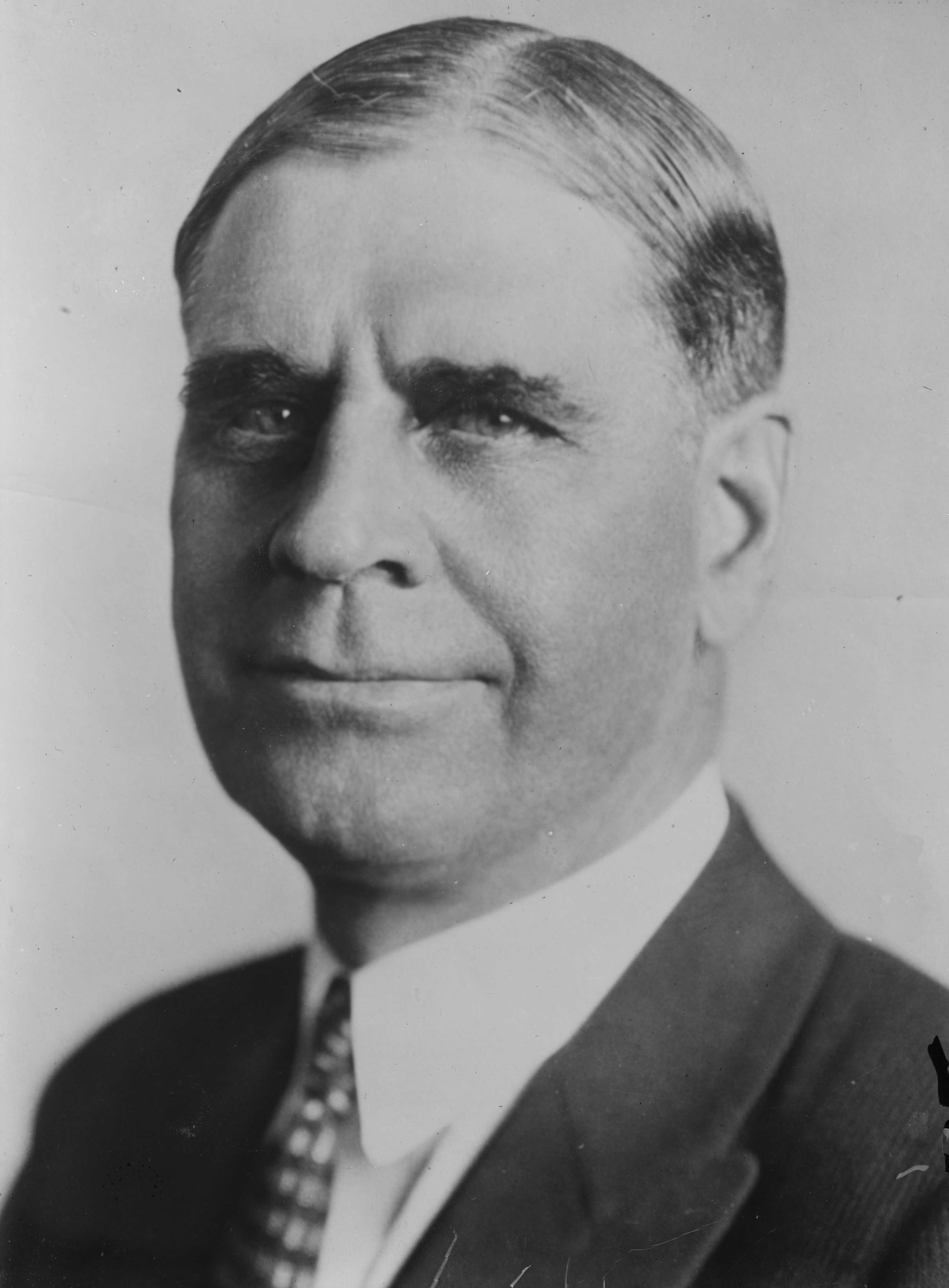

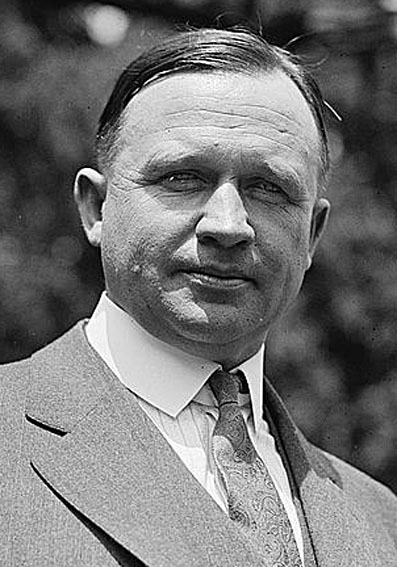
Nominee	George Dern	Charles R. Mabey
Party	Democratic	Republican
Popular vote	81,308	72,127
Percentage	52.99%	47.01%
- County results Dern: 50–60% 60–70% Mabey: 50–60% 60–70% 70–80%
Governor before election
Charles R. Mabey
Republican
Elected Governor
George Dern
Democratic

The 1924 Utah gubernatorial election was held on November 4, 1924. Democratic nominee George Dern defeated incumbent Republican Charles R. Mabey with 52.99% of the vote.

== General election ==
=== Candidates ===
- George Dern, State Senator from Salt Lake County and former general manager of Consolidated Mercur Gold Mines Company (Democratic)
- Charles R. Mabey, incumbent Governor since 1921 (Republican)

=== Results ===
1924 Utah gubernatorial election
Party	Candidate	Votes	%	±%
Democratic	George Dern	81,308	52.99%	+14.74%
Republican	Charles R. Mabey (incumbent)	72,127	47.01%	−11.16%
Total votes		153,435	100.00%	
Majority		9,181	5.98%	
Democratic gain from Republican		Swing	+25.91%	

=== Results by county ===
County	George Dern Democratic		Charles R. Mabey Republican		Margin		Total votes cast
County	#	%	#	%	#	%	Total votes cast
Beaver	912	49.84%	918	50.16%	-6	-0.33%	1,830
Box Elder	2,368	43.46%	3,081	56.54%	-713	-13.08%	5,449
Cache	4,558	48.22%	4,894	51.78%	-336	-3.55%	9,452
Carbon	2,990	61.80%	1,848	38.20%	1,142	23.60%	4,838
Daggett	30	23.08%	100	76.92%	-70	-53.85%	130
Davis	1,770	43.96%	2,256	56.04%	-486	-12.07%	4,026
Duchesne	930	42.86%	1,240	57.14%	-310	-14.29%	2,170
Emery	1,228	55.24%	995	44.76%	233	10.48%	2,223
Garfield	336	28.40%	847	71.60%	-511	-43.20%	1,183
Grand	301	52.62%	271	47.38%	30	5.24%	572
Iron	683	32.32%	1,430	67.68%	-747	-35.35%	2,113
Juab	1,651	55.05%	1,348	44.95%	303	10.10%	2,999
Kane	137	21.31%	506	78.69%	-369	-57.39%	643
Millard	1,335	39.87%	2,013	60.13%	-678	-20.25%	3,348
Morgan	429	48.42%	457	51.58%	-28	-3.16%	886
Piute	249	39.27%	385	60.73%	-136	-21.45%	634
Rich	227	35.47%	413	64.53%	-186	-29.06%	640
Salt Lake	32,819	57.46%	24,298	42.54%	8,521	14.92%	57,117
San Juan	243	36.49%	423	63.51%	-180	-27.03%	666
Sanpete	2,521	42.77%	3,373	57.23%	-852	-14.46%	5,894
Sevier	1,918	52.06%	1,766	47.94%	152	4.13%	3,684
Summit	1,260	46.58%	1,445	53.42%	-185	-6.84%	2,705
Tooele	1,250	52.76%	1,119	47.24%	131	5.53%	2,369
Uintah	844	39.74%	1,280	60.26%	-436	-20.53%	2,124
Utah	7,496	51.81%	6,972	48.19%	524	3.62%	14,468
Wasatch	980	46.80%	1,114	53.20%	-134	-6.40%	2,094
Washington	887	42.04%	1,223	57.96%	-336	-15.92%	2,110
Wayne	240	41.74%	335	58.26%	-95	-16.52%	575
Weber	10,716	64.97%	5,777	35.03%	4,939	29.95%	16,493
Total	81,308	52.99%	72,127	47.01%	9,181	5.98%	153,435

==== Counties that flipped from Republican to Democratic ====
- Carbon
- Emery
- Grand
- Juab
- Salt Lake
- Sevier
- Tooele
- Utah
- Weber
