= Paul Galanti =

American naval commander

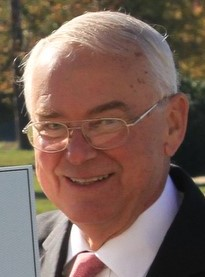
- Galanti in 2012

2nd Virginia Department of Veterans Services Commissioner
- In office April 2010 – October 10, 2014
- Preceded by: Vincent M. Burgess
- Succeeded by: John L. Newby II

Personal details
- Born: July 11, 1939 (age 87)
- Party: Republican
- Spouse: Phyllis Eason (m. 1963; died 2014)
- Children: 2
- Military career
- Allegiance: United States
- Branch: United States Armed Forces: United States Naval Academy (1958–1962); United States Navy (1962–1982)
- Service years: 1958–1982
- Rank: Commander O-5, US Navy
- Nickname: Pablo
- Conflicts: Cold War (1962–1982); Vietnam War (1966–1973)
- Awards: Silver Star, Legion of Merit w/ Combat "V" (2), Bronze Star w/ Combat "V", Purple Heart (2), Air Medal (9), Prisoner of War Medal

Paul Edward Galanti (born July 11, 1939) is a retired Commander in the United States Navy and Naval Aviator. He served on active duty from 1962 to 1982. He was a Prisoner of War from 1966 to 1973 during the Vietnam War serving 2,432 days in confinement. He was also a member of the Swift Boat Veterans for Truth, and the 2nd commissioner of the Virginia Department of Veterans Services.

== Career ==
Galanti grew up in an Army family. He graduated from Valley Forge Military Academy in 1957 and the U. S. Naval Academy in 1962, where he was the president of his class. Upon graduation, he immediately entered Navy flight training at Naval Air Station, Pensacola, Florida. Following completion of advanced jet training in November 1963, he became a jet flight instructor in Pensacola as a Selective Retrained Graduate (SERGRAD) of flight training. The following year, he completed fleet replacement training in the A-4 Skyhawk at Attack Squadron 125 (VA-125) at Naval Air Station Lemoore, California.

In November 1964, he joined Attack Squadron 216 (VA-216), home based at NAS Lemoore. The squadron was part of a carrier air wing aboard the aircraft carrier, USS Hancock, which departed for Southeast Asia in November 1965. Galanti flew 97 combat missions in his A-4C Skyhawk before being shot down and captured on June 17, 1966. He remained a prisoner of war of the North Vietnamese for nearly seven years and was released on February 12, 1973.

Following rehabilitation at Naval Hospital Portsmouth, he was assigned to Naval Recruiting District Richmond in Richmond, Virginia as its new executive officer. In May 1976, he received a Master of Commerce degree (MBA) from the University of Richmond after two years of night school. He then became commanding officer of the Naval Recruiting District Richmond. In July 1979, he moved to Annapolis, to become part of the Office of the Commandant at the Naval Academy.

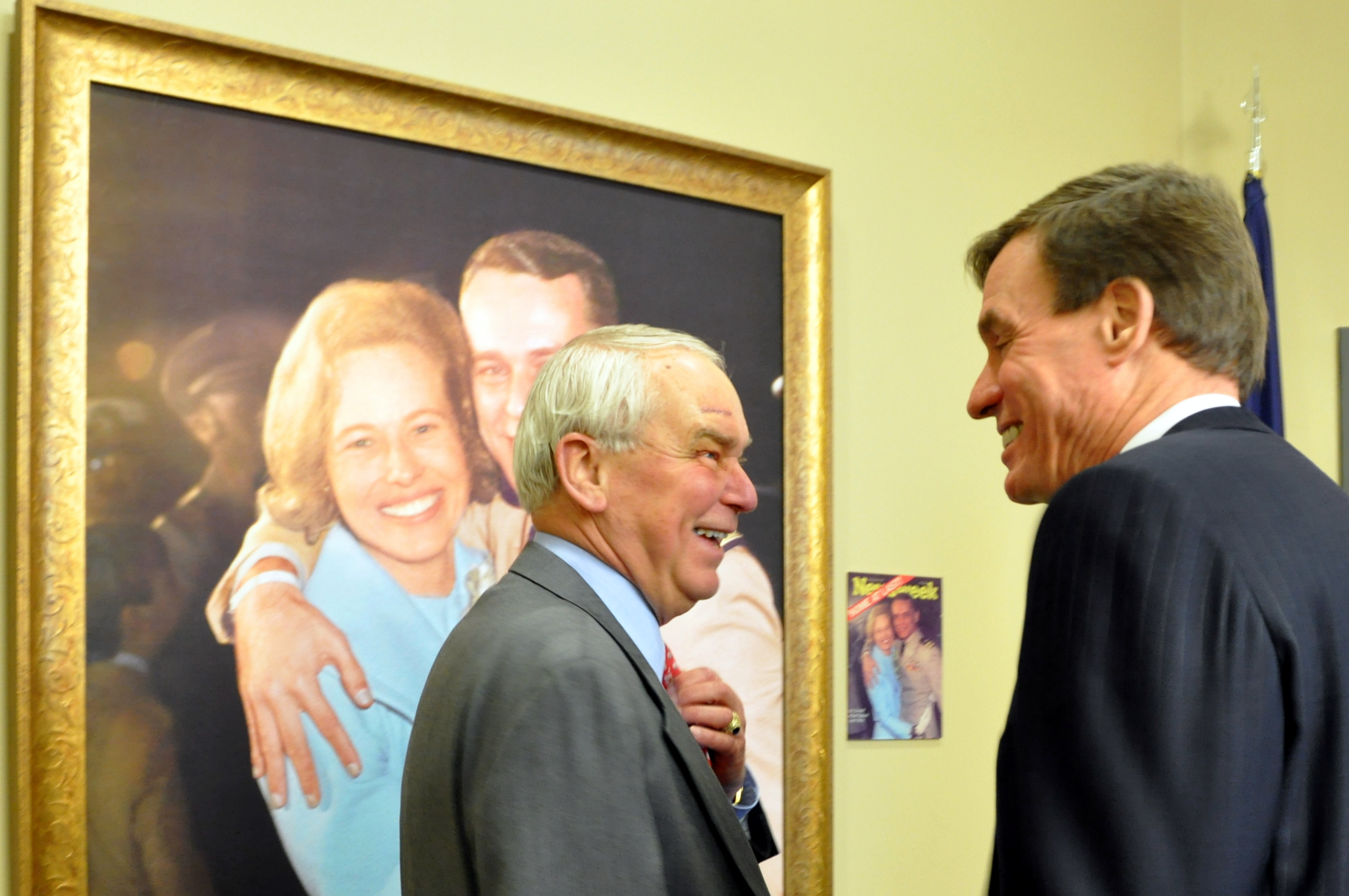
Galanti with Senator Mark Warner in front of a replication of the Newsweek cover.

After being medically retired from the Navy in 1983, he became the first non-pharmacist executive director of the Virginia Pharmaceutical Association. Joining the Medical Society of Virginia staff in September 1991, Galanti became the executive vice president of the society on January 1, 1993.

In 2000, he was the Virginia campaign director for Senator John McCain's presidential bid. In 2004, Galanti participated in the Swift Boat Veterans for Truth's ad campaign targeted at then-presidential contender John Kerry. He also worked with Senator McCain again on the senator's presidential bid in 2008.

He is the former president of the Virginia Aviation Foundation, the former president of the Science Museum of Virginia Foundation, the former president of Nam-POWs, a member of the national Vietnam POW Fraternity, and an elder at First Presbyterian Church in Richmond, Virginia. Additionally, he serves on the Secretary of Veterans Affairs' Advisory Committee on Former POWs. He is currently active in the American Ex-Prisoners of War service organization. In 2009, Paul was appointed as the 2nd commissioner of the Virginia Department of Veterans Service.

== Recognition ==
Galanti's decorations from his time in the Navy include the Silver Star, combat awards of two Legions of Merit and the Bronze Star Medal, nine combat Air Medals, and two Purple Hearts.

Galanti has appeared in several documentary films including the Discovery Channel's Emmy Award-winning "Vietnam POWs, Stories of Survival" and Public Television's "Return With Honor."

He was also inducted into the Virginia Aviation Hall of Fame in November 2005 on the basis of his career, and a replica of his A-4C from VA-216 is on display at the Virginia Aviation Museum in Richmond. The Virginia War Memorial in Richmond has an education wing named, "The Paul & Phyllis Galanti Education Center," where he served as commissioner.

Galanti appeared on the covers of Life (October 20, 1967) and Newsweek (February 26, 1973) and in the August 19, 1999 issue of Time. Selling Power highlighted his success story in a six-page motivation section, "Never Give Up, Never Give In", in its May/June 1996 issue. It also chose him as one of the twelve outstanding motivators in the United States in September 1996.

In 2019, he was awarded the Lone Sailor Award.

== Family ==
He was married to the former Phyllis Eason, who died on April 23, 2014. He has two sons.
