= William Goines =

U.S. Navy SEAL (1936–2024)

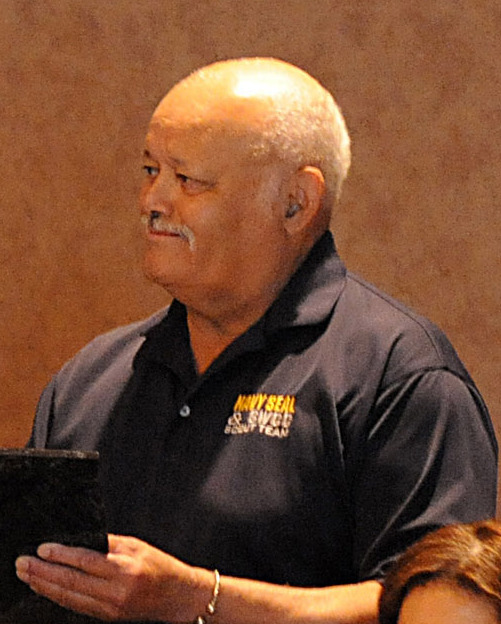
- Goines in 2010
- Born: September 10, 1936; Dayton, Ohio, U.S.
- Died: June 10, 2024 (aged 87); Norfolk, Virginia, U.S.
- Military career
- Branch: United States Navy
- Rank: Master chief petty officer
- Unit: SEAL Team Two

William Harvey Goines (September 10, 1936 – June 10, 2024) was a United States Navy SEAL and the first African-American Navy SEAL, though Engineman Second Class Fred "Tiz" Morrison has often been credited as being the first African-American Navy SEAL.

== Biography ==
Goines was born in Dayton, Ohio, on September 10, 1936. While he was a child, his family moved to Lockland, in suburban Cincinnati. His father worked menial jobs in the automotive industry, mainly for Oldsmobile, and had a second job in a pool hall, but often got fired from jobs because of the segregationist attitudes at the time. As a child, Goines was unaware that Lockland had a public swimming pool because African Americans were not allowed to swim there. He recalled that when the pool was forced to integrate, it was instead filled with rocks and gravel. He learned to swim in a nearby creek and the Little Miami River, and occasionally travelled with his family to a nearby pool in Cincinnati's Hartwell neighborhood, where African Americans were allowed to swim only on Saturday mornings from 8 to 12.

Goines attended all-black Lockland Wayne High School. In his junior year, after seeing the movie The Frogmen, he was inspired to join the Navy. He went to see a recruiter, but was told to finish high school first.

After receiving his diploma, Goines enlisted in the Navy in 1955. At the time, African-American recruits were tracked to become stewards (merged into Culinary specialist in 1975), but a man from Goines' hometown had told him not to become a steward because he would only be a servant for officers. Goines was promised training for underwater demolition, but plans changed, and he was sent to Malta, where 11 months later, he began Underwater Demolition Training Replacement (UDTR) with four US Navy officers, 85 US Navy enlisted sailors, five Army Rangers and two foreign naval officers. After three weeks, all of the Rangers and one foreign naval officer had dropped out. In April 1957, Goines graduated UDTR class 17 (now known as BUD/S) and was one of only 14 who completed the training. When President John F. Kennedy formed the first two SEAL teams in 1962, Team One on the West Coast and Team Two on the East Coast, Goines was one of 40 chosen to join Team Two and the only African-American Navy SEAL.

During the Cuban Missile Crisis, Goines was selected to be one of the first to go to Cuba, but the invasion was eventually scrapped. Goines served three tours in the Vietnam War with SEAL Team TWO, deploying twice with 14-man platoons, and once leading a Vietnamese unit. He was fluent in English, French and Spanish, but found it hard to learn Vietnamese in combat. However, he managed to teach Spanish to some of his Vietnamese interpreters for radio communication. In Vietnam, he was exposed to Agent Orange, which may have been responsible for him contracting prostate cancer. When he was preparing to go on a fourth tour, he was pulled out at the last minute and reassigned because his superiors needed a Spanish speaker to go to a Spanish-speaking country.

In 1976, Goines was selected to become part of the Chuting Stars, a Navy Parachute Demonstration Team, where he served for five years, performing 640 free falls and 194 static line jumps. During one jump in Pennsylvania, he landed wrong on a hill and "smashed all the cartilage" in his knees.

Goines retired from the Navy in 1987 as a Master Chief Petty Officer after 32 years of service, and was awarded the Bronze Star, the Navy Commendation Medal, the Meritorious Service Medal, a Combat Action Ribbon and the Presidential Unit Citation. Following his discharge, he relocated to Portsmouth, Virginia, where he became chief of police for the school system, serving for 14 years. He later started trying to recruit more people of color into Navy SEALs. He received the Lone Sailor Award in 2023.

Goines married Marie Davis. They had no children. He died after a heart attack in Norfolk, Virginia, on June 10, 2024, at the age of 87.
