= Wattis Brothers =

The Wattis Brothers was a 19th-century railway contracting firm operated by three brothers Edmund Orson Wattis Jr. (1855–1934), William H. Wattis (1859–1931), and Warren L. Wattis (1865–1928). It was founded in the early 1880s by William and Edmund to build railways for the Western expansion of the United States.

In 1881, all three brothers operated the railway contracting firm and partnered with, or work for, the Corey Brothers in their first construction job, building the Oregon Short Line Railroad lines in Idaho. They then went to Canada to work on the Canadian Pacific Railway, where their horses died of disease and they struggled to work through heavy snows. Wattis Brothers then joined with the Corey Brothers in the Corey Brothers & Company organization to meet the obligations for completing the railway line.

Wattis Brothers prospered until the Panic of 1893, a depression that affected the entire country. The company went broke after their bank failed.

Wattis Brothers founded the Utah Construction Company in 1900, and Thomas Dee and David Eccles later became significant investors in the railroad construction organization.
