= 1920 Utah gubernatorial election =

- November 2, 1920
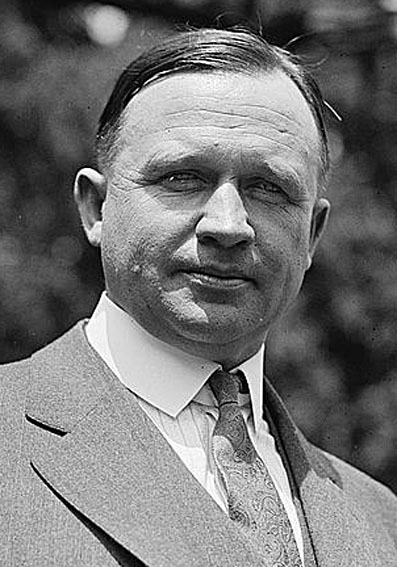

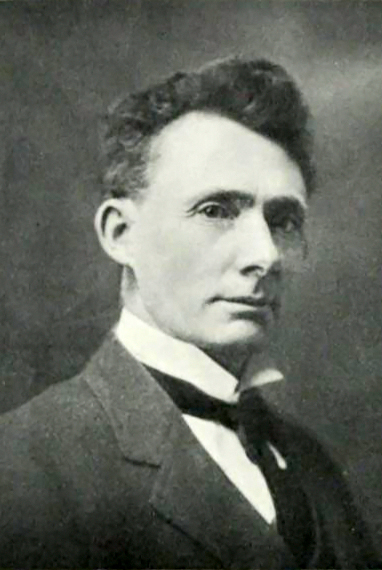
Nominee	Charles R. Mabey	Thomas N. Taylor
Party	Republican	Democratic
Popular vote	81,518	54,913
Percentage	58.17%	38.25%
- County results Mabey: 40–50% 50–60% 60–70% 70–80%
Governor before election
Simon Bamberger
Democratic
Elected Governor
Charles R. Mabey
Republican

The 1920 Utah gubernatorial election was held on November 2, 1920. Republican nominee Charles R. Mabey defeated Democratic nominee Thomas N. Taylor with 58.17% of the vote.

This would be the last time a Republican was elected Governor of Utah until 1948.

== General election ==
=== Candidates ===
Major party candidates

- Charles R. Mabey, Republican
- Thomas N. Taylor, Democratic

Other candidates

- E. B. Locke, Socialist
- George Crosby, Farmer–Labor

=== Results ===
1920 Utah gubernatorial election
Party	Candidate	Votes	%	±%
Republican	Charles R. Mabey	81,518	58.17%	+16.38%
Democratic	Thomas N. Taylor	54,913	38.25%	−16.87%
Socialist	E. B. Locke	2,843	1.98%	−1.10%
Farmer–Labor	George Crosby	2,300	1.60%	
Total votes		143,574	100.00%	
Majority		28,605	19.92%	
Republican gain from Democratic		Swing	+33.25%	

=== Results by county ===
County	Charles R. Mabey Republican		Thomas N. Taylor Democratic		E. B. Locke Socialist		George Crosby Farmer-Labor		Margin		Total votes cast
County	#	%	#	%	#	%	#	%	#	%	Total votes cast
Beaver	1,068	58.30%	725	39.57%	25	1.36%	14	0.76%	343	18.72%	1,832
Box Elder	3,547	61.17%	2,202	37.97%	28	0.48%	22	0.38%	1,345	23.19%	5,799
Cache	5,179	55.10%	4,142	44.06%	50	0.53%	29	0.31%	1,037	11.03%	9,400
Carbon	1,719	48.66%	1,484	42.00%	90	2.55%	240	6.79%	235	6.65%	3,533
Daggett	93	72.66%	32	25.00%	3	2.34%	0	0.00%	61	47.66%	128
Davis	2,869	69.96%	1,217	29.68%	9	0.22%	6	0.15%	1,652	40.28%	4,101
Duchesne	1,504	60.99%	844	34.23%	45	1.82%	73	2.96%	660	26.76%	2,466
Emery	1,315	55.04%	1,002	41.94%	59	2.47%	13	0.54%	313	13.10%	2,389
Garfield	995	69.43%	424	29.59%	8	0.56%	6	0.42%	571	39.85%	1,433
Grand	304	51.01%	280	46.98%	6	1.01%	6	1.01%	24	4.03%	596
Iron	1,430	71.32%	532	26.53%	41	2.04%	2	0.10%	898	44.79%	2,005
Juab	1,709	54.07%	1,289	40.78%	129	4.08%	34	1.08%	420	13.29%	3,161
Kane	485	70.29%	202	29.28%	2	0.29%	1	0.14%	283	41.01%	690
Millard	2,202	62.57%	1,194	33.93%	105	2.98%	18	0.51%	1,008	28.64%	3,519
Morgan	571	60.23%	373	39.35%	2	0.21%	2	0.21%	198	20.89%	948
Piute	540	64.06%	282	33.45%	13	1.54%	8	0.95%	258	30.60%	843
Rich	460	69.17%	205	30.83%	0	0.00%	0	0.00%	255	38.35%	665
Salt Lake	28,865	59.00%	18,500	37.81%	1,322	2.70%	240	0.49%	10,365	21.18%	48,927
San Juan	496	62.00%	284	35.50%	19	2.38%	1	0.13%	212	26.50%	800
Sanpete	3,778	60.83%	2,366	38.09%	58	0.93%	9	0.14%	1,412	22.73%	6,211
Sevier	2,506	63.17%	1,418	35.74%	28	0.71%	15	0.38%	1,088	27.43%	3,967
Summit	1,536	61.24%	853	34.01%	64	2.55%	55	2.19%	683	27.23%	2,508
Tooele	1,408	57.38%	903	36.80%	53	2.16%	90	3.67%	505	20.58%	2,454
Uintah	1,322	58.65%	863	38.29%	62	2.75%	7	0.31%	459	20.36%	2,254
Utah	7,582	52.51%	6,475	44.84%	265	1.84%	117	0.81%	1,107	7.67%	14,439
Wasatch	1,029	59.31%	695	40.06%	9	0.52%	2	0.12%	334	19.25%	1,735
Washington	1,154	53.80%	985	45.92%	4	0.19%	2	0.09%	169	7.88%	2,145
Wayne	383	59.75%	245	38.22%	11	1.72%	2	0.31%	138	21.53%	641
Weber	7,469	53.41%	4,897	35.02%	333	2.38%	1,286	9.20%	2,572	18.39%	13,985
Total	83,518	58.17%	54,913	38.25%	2,843	1.98%	2,300	1.60%	28,605	19.92%	143,574

==== Counties that flipped from Democratic to Republican ====
- Beaver
- Cache
- Carbon
- Davis
- Duchesne
- Emery
- Garfield
- Grand
- Iron
- Juab
- Millard
- Piute
- Rich
- Salt Lake
- San Juan
- Summit
- Tooele
- Uintah
- Utah
- Wasatch
- Washington
- Wayne
- Weber
