= Thomas Duncombe Dee =

American businessman (1844–1905)

Thomas D. Dee
- Born: November 10, 1844; Llanelli, Wales
- Died: July 9, 1905 (aged 60)
- Known for: Utah Construction Company

Thomas Duncombe Dee (November 10, 1844 – July 9, 1905) was an American businessman from Utah.

== Biography ==
Dee was born in Llanelli, Carmarthenshire, Wales. His parents converted to the Church of Jesus Christ of Latter-day Saints (LDS Church) in 1856, and the family relocated to Ogden, Utah, in 1860.

Dee had been working as an apprentice carpenter in Wales and soon was building residential and commercial buildings in Ogden. In 1876, he joined industrialist David Eccles and Hiram Spencer in founding businesses in the western U.S., ranging from sugar to lumber to water and shoes and banking.

In 1900, Dee became an investor and first president of the Utah Construction Company of Ogden, Utah. On July 3, 1905, he slipped into the water while inspecting a potential site for a dam, contracted pneumonia, and died. In 1906, the community was named Dee, Oregon, in his honor.

Dee served for over 20 years as the LDS Church's Sunday School superintendent in the Ogden Third Ward and then in the Mound Fort Ward. For almost two decades preceding his death, he served as a counselor to the bishop of the Mound Fort Ward.

Among several other civic positions, Dee served as a member of the Ogden City Council.

== Sources ==
Jenson, Andrew. Latter-day Saints Biographical Encyclopedia, vol. 3, p. 58
