= Utah Construction Company =

Construction company founded in 1900

The Utah Construction Company was a construction company founded by Edmund Orson Wattis Jr., Warren L. Wattis and William H. Wattis in 1900.

== History ==
Utah Construction logo from 1900 - 1958

Utah Construction logo from 1959 - 1970

Utah International logo after acquisition by BHP

The Wattis Brothers received funding from David Eccles, Thomas Dee, Joseph Clark and James Pingree families. Thomas Dee served as the first president of Utah Construction until his death in 1905, David Eccles served as the second president, and Eccles's son Marriner became the president of Utah Construction concurrently with being the Federal Reserve chairman. The shareholders and Val Browning acquired the shares of Warren Wattis in the 1940s. The Wattis Brothers' original $8,000 investment in 1900 grew to $478 million after the 1976 acquisition by General Electric.

Only four years after its founding, the company was awarded the contract to build the Feather River rail route, between Oakland and Salt Lake City, for the Western Pacific Railroad. The line was completed in 1909. The $60 million project had been extremely challenging but, after five years, very profitable. The Utah Construction Company subsequently thrived, and soon captured a large share of tunneling, grading, and track projects for the rapidly expanding railroads in the Mountain West. Foreseeing the end of railroad expansion, the Wattis Brothers looked for ways to diversify their construction risks.

In 1917, the Utah Construction Company was awarded the $7 million O'Shaughnessy Dam contract, a controversial project that impounded the Tuolumne River in the Hetch Hetchy Valley of California's Sierra Nevada mountains. The success of the O'Shaughnessy Dam convinced the Wattis Brothers to bid on more dam projects. In 1922, Utah Construction Company formed a partnership with Morrison-Knudsen of Boise. With Frank Crowe as the chief engineer, the MK-UC partnership successfully built dams throughout the American west.

In 1931, the Wattis Brothers spearheaded the formation of Six Companies to build the Hoover Dam, which was the largest construction project ever tackled by the US Government up to that time. Including the Hoover Dam, Utah Construction built 58 dams between 1916 and 1969.

In 1942, several weeks after the Japanese bombing of Pearl Harbor, Japanese warships were sighted in Alaskan waters. No overland route existed connecting Alaska with the contiguous United States, which spurred the American Government to plan and build the Alaskan Army Highway, later renamed the Alaska Highway. US Army and civilian contractors, led by Utah Construction, completed the 1,500 miles (2,400 km) Arctic highway in just seven months and 17 days.

In the 1950s, Utah Construction diversified into mining, becoming the Utah Construction & Mining Co. Related ventures included the Marcona iron mine in Peru, the Lucky Mc uranium mine in Wyoming, and the Navajo coal mine, and power plant in the Four Corners area of the United States southwest.

Utah Construction further diversified into land development. Through acquisitions, the company purchased the Moraga Ranch in the San Francisco Bay Area. The 3,000-acre (1,200-hectare) ranch was developed into Moraga, California. Utah also filled in 400 acres (160 ha) of the San Francisco Bay to create much of the area of present-day south shore in Alameda.

In the 1960s, Utah Construction engaged in further military construction, as the lead contractor for the US Minuteman Missile hardened silos throughout the United States, as well as Construction of the Cheyenne Mountain Complex in Colorado Springs.

In 1969, Utah Construction went public on the New York Stock Exchange with the symbol UC. In the same year, the construction business was sold to the Fluor Corporation. In 1971, the company changed its name to Utah International. It merged with General Electric in 1976, with a value of over $2.2 billion, the largest corporate merger in history up to that time. In 1984, General Electric sold the company to BHP.

== Sources ==
- Sessions, Gene & Sterling. Utah International, A Biography of a Business. ISBN 0-9722102-0-2
