= Charles R. Mabey =

American politician (1877–1959)

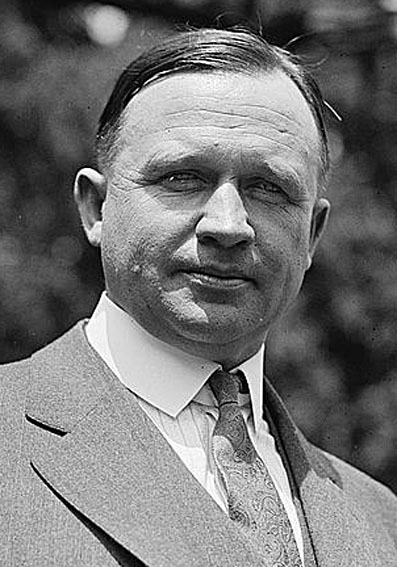

5th Governor of Utah
- In office January 3, 1921 – January 5, 1925
- Preceded by: Simon Bamberger
- Succeeded by: George Dern

Member of the Utah House of Representatives from the 6th district
- In office January 13, 1913 – January 8, 1917
- Preceded by: John W. Thornley
- Succeeded by: Francis H. Nalder

Personal details
- Born: Charles Rendell Mabey; October 4, 1877 Bountiful, Utah Territory
- Died: April 26, 1959 (aged 81) Bountiful, Utah, U.S.
- Party: Republican
- Spouse: Afton Rampton
- Children: 4
- Profession: Politician; Religious Leader

Charles Rendell Mabey (October 4, 1877 – April 26, 1959) was an American politician who served as the fifth governor of Utah from 1921 to 1925. He is the last Utah governor to serve one term. He was a member of the Republican Party.

== Life and career ==
Mabey was born in Bountiful in the Utah Territory. He served in the United States Army during the Spanish–American War.

From 1900 to 1903, Mabey served as a missionary for the Church of Jesus Christ of Latter-day Saints (LDS Church) in Germany.

Mabey was a banker by trade. He was a member of the Utah House of Representatives from 1913 to 1917 and served again on active duty in the Utah Field Artillery during World War I. He also served for a time as mayor of Bountiful, Utah.

From 1925 to 1935, Mabey served as a member of the General Board of the Young Men's Mutual Improvement Association of the LDS Church.

Mabey fathered four children, all of them boys: Rendell, Charles, Robert, and Edward.

He died in Bountiful on April 26, 1959. He was 81.

== Works ==
- Mabey, Charles R. (1899). History of the Operations of the Utah Light Artillery. Salt Lake City: s.n.
- —— (1900). The Utah Batteries: A History. Salt Lake City: Daily Reporter Co. p. 3.
- —— (1940). The Pony Express: An Epic of the Old West. Salt Lake City: Beverly Craftsmen.
- —— (1947). Our Father's House: Joseph Thomas Mabey Family History. Salt Lake City: Beverly Craftsmen.
- —— (1957). September Sunflowers: Compositions of Prose and Poetry. Salt Lake City: Beverly Craftsmen.

== See also ==
- List of members of the American Legion

Party political offices
Preceded by Nephi L. Morris	Republican nominee for Governor of Utah; 1920, 1924	Succeeded by William H. Wattis
Political offices
Preceded by Simon Bamberger	Governor of Utah; 1921–1925	Succeeded by George H. Dern
