= Six Companies =

American corporate joint venture formed to build the Hoover Dam

Six Companies, Inc.
- Type: Joint venture
- Industry: Construction; Railroad
- Founded: February 1931; 95 years ago
- Key people: Frank Crowe
- Owners: Kaiser-Bechtel (30%); MacDonald and Kahn (20%); Utah Construction Company (20%); Morrison-Knudsen (10%); Pacific Bridge Company (10%); J.F. Shea Co (10%)

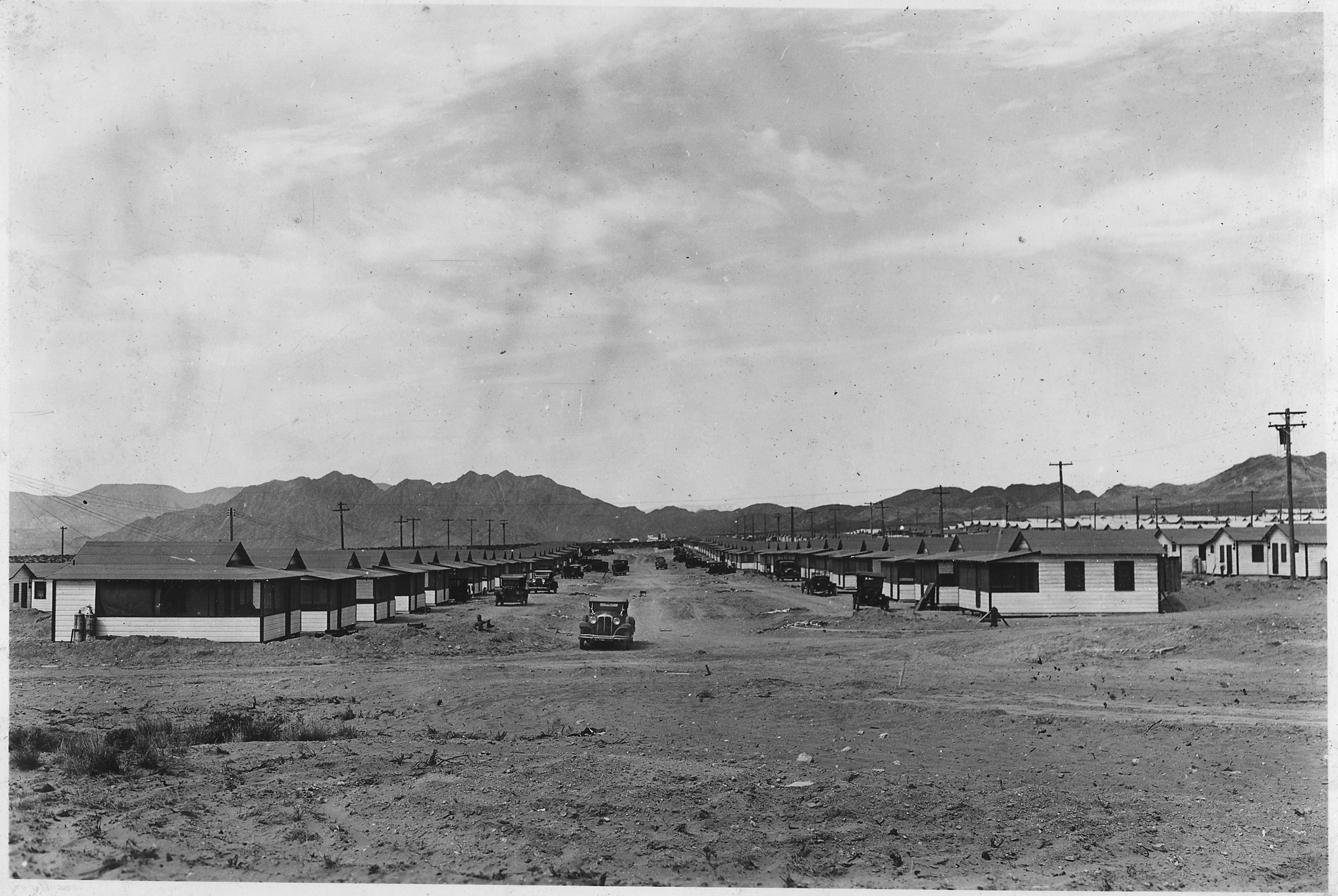
Cottages erected by Six Companies, Inc., in recently developed section in southeast limits of Boulder City Nevada

Six Companies, Inc. was a joint venture of construction companies that was formed to build the Hoover Dam on the Colorado River in Nevada and Arizona.

They later built Parker Dam, a portion of the Grand Coulee Dam, the Colorado River Aqueduct across the Mojave and Colorado Deserts to urban Southern California, and many other large projects.

== Hoover Dam ==
On January 10, 1932, the Bureau of Reclamation made bid documents for the Hoover Dam construction project, then known as the Boulder Canyon Project, available to interested parties at $5 a copy (equivalent to $118.00 in 2025). The government would provide the materials, and the contractor was to prepare the site and build the dam. The dam was described in minute detail, covering 100 pages of text and 76 drawings. A $2 million (equivalent to $42.3 million in 2025) bid bond was to accompany each bid. The winner would have to post a $5 million (equivalent to $106 million in 2025) performance bond. The contractor would have seven years to build the dam, or penalties would ensue.

Because of the project's immense size and the fact that it was the first dam on the Colorado River, no single contractor had the resources to make a qualified bid alone. So, general contractors Utah Construction Company of Ogden, Utah decided to form a consortium in order to submit a joint bid for the contract. Initially, Utah Construction Company's owners, brothers E.O. and W.H. Wattis, along with the company's vice president, Andrew H. Christensen, asked Harry W. Morrison of Morrison-Knudsen to join them. After they realized the bid would be much higher than expected, the Wattis brothers and Morrison–Knudsen convinced four additional companies to join the venture. In February 1930, Six Companies, Inc. was incorporated as a joint venture, and the group enlisted Morrison–Knudsen engineer Frank T. Crowe to help prepare its bid.

The project was so complex and large that only three bids were received and, on March 4, 1931, the US Secretary of the Interior accepted the Six Companies' bid of US$48,890,955 (equivalent to $832 million in 2025). This was $5,000,000 lower than the next bidder, meaning a bid-spread of almost 10%.

The Six Companies board selected Crowe, who had helped draft the bid, as the General Construction Superintendent of the Boulder Dam construction. He was heavily involved and hired each of the men who were employed during the course of the project, lived in Boulder City with his wife and two daughters, and was on the dam site every day of the week until the project was completed.

Work began around June 1931 and The Six Companies completed the dam's construction two years ahead of schedule in 1935. Crowe was awarded a bonus percentage of the profit for completing virtually every portion of the job well ahead of schedule. The dam was dedicated in September 1935 but it took an additional nine years (1938–1947) under relative secrecy, to fix serious leaks with a supplemental grout curtain.

== Six Companies Railroad ==
The Six Companies also built the 19.1-mile (30.7 km) Six Companies Railroad. It ran along the Hemenway Wash, present day Las Vegas Bay, and connected to the US Government Hoover Dam Railroad at Lawler, Nevada, a location also known as "US Government Junction". From Lawler the railroad went north for seven miles (11 km) to Saddle Island and then east to the Three-Way Junction gravel plant, now submerged under Lake Mead. From the gravel plant the line split into two branches. One branch ran south for 4.8 miles (7.7 km) to the dam via Cape Horn, Lomix (the Low Level Concrete Mixing Plant) and Himix (the High Level Concrete Mixing Plant) and the dam face. The other branch, now also submerged under Lake Mead, ran north for 7.3 miles (11.7 km) across the Las Vegas Wash, crossed the Colorado River on a bridge into Arizona and the Arizona gravel pit (Arizona Gravel Deposits) at a location two miles (3.2 km) from Callville.

The line was constructed by railroad contractor John Phillips of San Francisco, California. Since the completion of the dam and filling of Lake Mead, Six Companies, Inc. railroad line is now submerged.

The Western Pacific Railroad purchased several of the Six Companies dump cars for company service after the dam was completed and the equipment declared surplus. One of these cars is now preserved at the Western Pacific Railroad Museum at Portola, California.

The US Government Railroad had a 10-mile (16 km) branch that brought supplies by rail from a connection with the Boulder City Branch of the Union Pacific Railroad at Boulder City, Nevada.

== Second World War ==
During World War II, three of the Six Companies built airstrips and related facilities on Pacific islands for Contractors Pacific Naval Air Bases. The Utah Company built facilities on Samoa. The Bechtel Company was building a naval air station on Cavite when the Philippines were attacked by Japan. The Morrison-Knudsen Company built naval air stations and other facilities on the Wake Atoll and Midway Atoll. They also built the Red Hill Underground Fuel Storage Facility at Pearl Harbor.

The Pacific Bridge Co. had contracts with the Navy to build dry docks and other facilities at Pearl Harbor. The company was expert at underwater construction having built the piers for the western span of the San Francisco-Oakland Bay Bridge and the Golden Gate Bridge. Pacific Bridge did much of the underwater patching and coffer dams needed to salvage the damaged ships at Pearl Harbor.

The Permanente Cement Company produced and shipped over seven million barrels of cement from 1939-1940 to fulfill all of the needs of the Navy during the Pacific campaign.

The venture also held a majority ownership interest in Joshua Hendy Iron Works in Sunnyvale, California. Hendy was most known for its record-breaking assembly line production of 754 Liberty Ship EC-2 Reciprocating Steam Engines, producing one engine every 40.8 hours. They were used at the Richmond Shipyards.

== Company structure ==
Six Companies constituent ownership
1. Bechtel-Kaiser (30.0%)
2. MacDonald and Kahn (20.0%)
3. Utah Construction Company (20.0%)
4. Morrison-Knudsen (10.0%)
5. Pacific Bridge Company (10.0%)
6. J.F. Shea Co (10.0%)

Six Companies Inc. was composed of:

1. Henry J. Kaiser Co. of Oakland, California and Bechtel Corporation of San Francisco (as Bechtel-Kaiser): 30%
2. MacDonald and Kahn of Los Angeles, California: 20%
3. Utah Construction Company of Ogden, Utah: 20%
4. Morrison-Knudsen of Boise, Idaho: 10%,
5. Pacific Bridge Company of Portland, Oregon: 10%
6. J.F. Shea Co of Portland, Oregon: 10%

Leadership was split between the companies with officers:

- W.H. Wattis of Utah Construction Company (President)
- W.A. Bechtel of Bechtel-Kaiser (First Vice President)
- E.O. Wattis of Utah Construction Company (2nd Vice President)
- Charles A Shea of J.F. Shea Co (Secretary)
- Felix Kahn of MacDonald and Kahn (Treasurer)
- K.K. Bechtel of Bechtel-Kaiser (Assistant Secretary-Treasurer)

Board members included:

- W.H. Wattis
- E.O. Wattis
- Charles A. Shea
- Felix Kahn
- Stephen D. Bechtel
- Henry J. Kaiser
- Alan MacDonald
- Philip Hart

== See also ==
- Grand Coulee Dam
- Parker Dam
