= Frank Crowe =

Civil engineer

Francis Trenholm Crowe
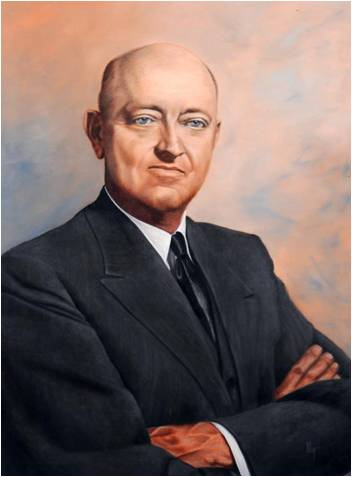
- Born: October 12, 1882; Trenholmville, Quebec
- Died: February 26, 1946 (aged 63); Redding, California
- Education: University of Maine
- Occupation: Civil engineer

Francis Trenholm Crowe (October 12, 1882 – February 26, 1946) was a Canadian civil engineer and employee of Morrison-Knudsen, who later became in 1931, the General Construction Superintendent of the Hoover Dam construction contract.

Born in Trenholmville, Quebec, Crowe attended the Governor Dummer Academy, matriculating to the University of Maine where he graduated in 1905 with a degree in civil engineering. He was a member of the Maine Alpha chapter of Sigma Alpha Epsilon. The University's Francis Crowe Society is named in his honor. Crowe became interested in the American west during a lecture given by Frank Elwin Weymouth (1874-1941), a civil engineer with the United States Bureau of Reclamation. He signed up for a summer job before the end of the lecture. That summer job began a 20-year career with the reclamation service that would change the face of the American west. In 1924, Frank Crowe left the United States Bureau of Reclamation to join the construction firm of Morrison-Knudsen in Boise, Idaho. Morrison-Knudsen had recently signed a partnership with the larger Utah Construction Company to build dams.

While working on the Arrowrock Dam in Idaho, Crowe pioneered two practices that are crucial to the construction of large dams. The first was a pneumatic delivery system to transport concrete and the second was a system of overhead cables to allow the pneumatic concrete to be pumped at any point on the construction site. With this technique, Crowe built some of the largest dams in the American west, including the Hoover Dam, Parker Dam 155 miles (249 km) downstream from Hoover; Copper Basin and Gene Wash Dams on the Colorado Aqueduct system; and Shasta Dam in Northern California. All these dams were important but none approached the mythic scale or mystique of Hoover Dam.

He retired in 1944 to his 20,000-acre (81 km^{2}) cattle ranch near Redding, California, where he died of a heart attack on February 26, 1946. He had a wife, Linnie, and two daughters.

== Popular culture ==
The Hoover Dam construction project and Frank Crowe's role (portrayed by actor Jay Benedict) was dramatised in an episode of the BBC's 2003 docudrama television miniseries Seven Wonders of the Industrial World.

The project and Frank Crowe's role was also dramatized in The History Channel's series America: The Story of Us in episode 9 entitled Bust.
