= Hoover Dam (disambiguation) =

Hoover Dam is a dam on the Colorado River bordering Nevada and Arizona, US.

Hoover Dam or Hooverdam may also refer to:

- Hoover Dam (Ohio), a dam near Westerville, Ohio, US
- "Hoover Dam", a song from the album Copper Blue by Sugar
- Hooverdam (album), by Hugh Cornwell

== See also ==
- Hoover Dam Police, the Colorado River dam's police force
- Hoover Dam Bypass or Mike O'Callaghan – Pat Tillman Memorial Bridge, a bridge crossing the Colorado downstream of Hoover Dam
- Hoover Dam in popular culture
- Boulder Dam (disambiguation)
