= Beaster (disambiguation) =

Beaster is the second EP by the band Sugar.

Beaster may also refer to:

- Beasters, cannabis
- Beasters, a fan of Becky G
