= File Under: Easy Listening =

Studio album by Sugar
- Released: September 6, 1994
- Recorded: 1994
- Genre: Power pop
- Length: 39:58
- Labels: Rykodisc, Creation
- Producer: Bob Mould

Sugar chronology
Beaster (1993)	File Under: Easy Listening (1994)	Besides (1995)

Singles from File Under: Easy Listening
- 1. "Your Favorite Thing" Released: 1994; 2. "Believe What You're Saying" Released: 1994; 3. "Gee Angel" Released: 1995

File Under: Easy Listening (also known as F.U.E.L.) is the second (not counting the EP Beaster) and final studio album by Sugar.

== Background ==
Primary songwriter Bob Mould discussed material written after Beaster in 1993: "It's pretty punk rock. Not real fast, just pretty basic. A lot of it's really vocal-y. Really beautiful and really harmonic, but it's real piledriving… Weird chord changes underneath real traditional vocal lines. So I think it'll be somewhere between these last two records. Also, I'm really starting to hate guitar solos, so I'm trying to avoid them. I'm bending a lot of strings, starting to sound like Johnny Thunders again."

Initial sessions for the album in Atlanta were suspended because the band was unhappy with the way the album sounded. Mould proceeded to erase the master tapes and "[recorded the album] in reverse, where I did all my stuff. Then I brought David [Barbe] back in, and we brought Malcolm [Travis] in. We did drums last, and it turned out great."

== Reception ==
Professional ratings
Review scores
Source	Rating
AllMusic	4.5/5 stars
The A.V. Club	B
Entertainment Weekly	A
The Guardian	3/4 stars
NME	9/10
Pitchfork	7.8/10
Q	4/5 stars
Rolling Stone	3.5/5 stars
Select	4/5
The Village Voice	A

"F.U.E.L. finds former Hüsker Dü man Bob Mould exorcising more demons over a structured barrage of pop noises," observed Steve Lamacq in Q. "The sounds and textures come from the dark, brooding Beaster while the melodies are lifted from the poppier Copper Blue." Writing for website Nude as the News, Mark Donohue praises the album as "an accomplishment, one of the '90s most unfairly overlooked records."

"File Under Easy Listening is the kind of title that a third-rate death metal band would come with…" quipped Clark Collis in Select. "Also, there's the production. Where tracks like 'Changes' or 'Hoover Dam' off Copper Blue leapt out of the speakers with all the unrestrained force and tang of a nuclear-powered kipper, most of F.U.E.L. would probably ask your auntie's permission before even turning up… And then, slowly but surely, it all begins to make sense." The album peaked at No. 7 in the UK and No. 32 in Canada.

== Track listing ==
All tracks are written by Bob Mould; except where indicated. "We've come to a realisation," said Mould. "For all intents and purposes, it's my deal."

Original album (2012 edition - Disc one)
No.	Title	Writer(s)	Length
1.	"Gift"		4:14
2.	"Company Book"	David Barbe	3:45
3.	"Your Favorite Thing"		3:51
4.	"What You Want It to Be"		4:13
5.	"Gee Angel"		3:56
6.	"Panama City Motel"		4:07
7.	"Can't Help You Anymore"		3:29
8.	"Granny Cool"		3:33
9.	"Believe What You're Saying"		3:56
10.	"Explode and Make Up"		4:54

2012 edition - Disc one - B-sides
No.	Title	Writer(s)	Length
11.	"Mind Is an Island" (B-side of "Your Favourite Thing")		3:37
12.	"Frustration" (B-side of "Your Favourite Thing")	Barbe	5:18
13.	"Going Home" (B-side of "Your Favourite Thing")		2:40
14.	"In the Eyes of My Friends" (B-side of "Believe What You're Saying")	Barbe	3:32
15.	"And You Tell Me" (B-side of "Believe What You're Saying")		5:02
16.	"Believe What You're Saying (Campfire Mix)"		3:53

2012 edition - Disc two - The Joke Is Always on Us, Sometimes (Live At First Avenue, Minneapolis, Minnesota, 2 November 1994)
No.	Title	Writer(s)	Length
1.	"Gift"		4:12
2.	"Company Book"	Barbe	3:28
3.	"Hoover Dam"		3:08
4.	"After All the Roads Have Led to Nowhere" (B-side of "Gee Angel")		3:42
5.	"Where Diamonds Are Halos"	Barbe	4:21
6.	"Slick"		4:04
7.	"Going Home"		2:13
8.	"Running Out of Time"		2:29
9.	"Frustration"	Barbe	4:38
10.	"Changes"		3:44
11.	"Can't Help You Any More"		2:59
12.	"Helpless"		3:04
13.	"If I Can't Change Your Mind"		3:04
14.	"In the Eyes of My Friends"	Barbe	3:12
15.	"Clownmaster" (B-side of "Gee Angel live")		2:43
16.	"Gee Angel" (A-side of "Gee Angel live")		4:17
17.	"Explode and Make Up" (B-side of "Gee Angel")		4:39
18.	"The Slim" (B-side of "Gee Angel")		8:36

2012 edition - Disc three - DVD
No.	Title	Length
1.	"Your Favourite Thing" (Promo video)
2.	"Believe What You're Saying" (Promo video)
3.	"Gee Angel" (Promo video)
4.	"MTV Sugar Feature" (TV appearance)
5.	"Believe What You're Saying - Bob Mould & Lou Barlow (Live On MTV 120 Minutes)" (TV appearance)

== Personnel ==
- Bob Mould – guitars, vocals
- David Barbe – bass, vocals
- Malcolm Travis – drums
- James SK Wān – bamboo flute

== Charts ==
=== Album ===
Chart performance for File Under: Easy Listening
Chart (1994)	Peak position
Australian Albums (ARIA)	72
Canada Top Albums/CDs (RPM)	32
New Zealand Albums (RMNZ)	10
UK Albums Chart	7
US Billboard 200	50

=== Single ===
Chart performance for singles from File Under: Easy Listening
Title	Chart (1994)	Peak position
"Your Favorite Thing"	UK Singles Chart	48
"Your Favorite Thing"	US Billboard Modern Rock Tracks	14
"Believe What You're Saying"	UK Singles Chart	73
