= Boulder Dam (disambiguation) =

The Boulder Dam is the former name for the Hoover Dam.

Boulder Dam may also refer to:

- Boulder Dam (film), a 1936 film starring Ross Alexander, Patricia Ellis and Lyle Talbot
- Boulder Dam Hotel, a hotel located in Boulder City, Nevada
- Lake Mead National Recreation Area, also called the Boulder Dam Recreation Area
- Lost City Museum, formerly called the Boulder Dam Park Museum

== See also ==
- Hoover Dam (disambiguation)
