= Hoover Dam in popular culture =

Hoover Dam has made frequent appearances in various forms of media on account of its size and national prominence within the United States. Prior to the dam's completion in 1936, the Boulder Dam construction project was likewise the subject of a number of films.

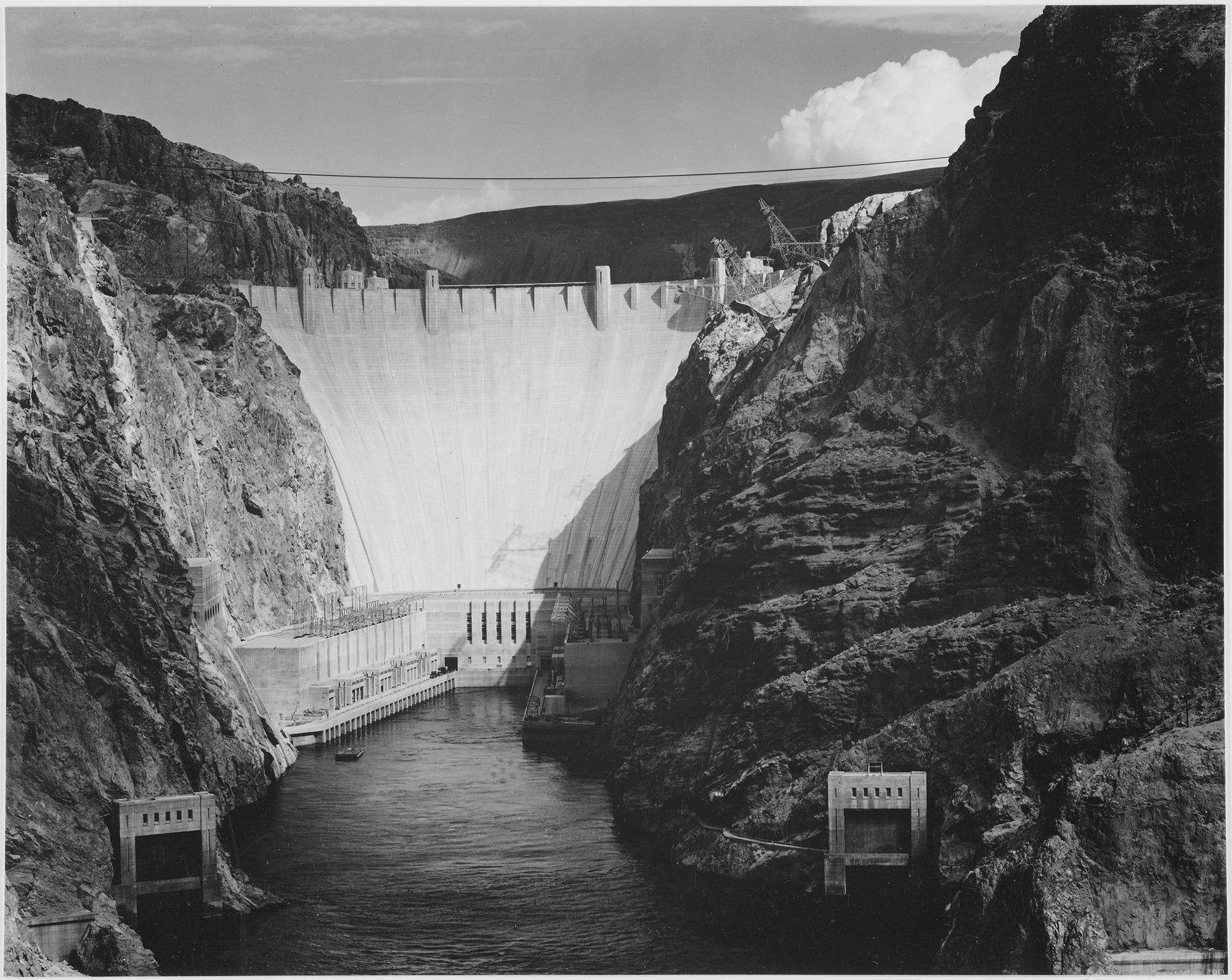
A 1941 photograph by Ansel Adams of the then Boulder Dam.

== Description ==
Even before its construction, Hoover Dam had an effect on popular culture in the American west. Starting in the 1920s, politicians and newspapers in the Southwest called for the construction of a dam on the Colorado river. To rally public support for the project, conceptual sketches of the future dam were published, often accompanied with vivid descriptions of the wealth of resources the dam would provide; the project was often described with terms like "great", and was compared to other great engineering projects (such as the Pyramids of Giza and the Great Wall of China) with the Los Angeles Times describing the project as a "gateway of Empire."

After construction of the dam began, imagery of the dam switched from conceptual to more documentary – the Bureau of Reclamation produced a large number of photographs documenting the building of the dam, publishing these in newspapers and magazines to ensure public and political support for the project continued. The immense size of the project (physically and in terms of workers employed to construct it) came to be seen as a symbol of American innovation and progress during the ongoing Great Depression, cementing the dam in the American popular consciousness. Influential artists such as modernist Charles Sheeler, muralist William Gropper, illustrator Hugh Ferriss, and photographer Ansel Adams all produced works depicting the dam.

Capitalizing on the dam's popularity, private businesses began to use images of the dam to advertise products, while the National Park Service hoped to use the newly formed Lake Mead to promote tourism in the area. Hoover dam's likeness appears on many pieces of kitsch, and has been used in advertisements for Alcoa, Coca-Cola, Jim Beam, Pan Am, Pontiac, R. J. Reynolds Tobacco Company, Sunoco, Studebaker, and Westinghouse; advertisements featuring the dam normally include the dam as either a symbol of engineering or as a landmark.

Hoover Dam has also appeared in numerous films, tv series, and documentaries. Even prior to the dam's completion, the massive size of the construction project – coupled with its symbolic value – drew the attention of the American film industry, with several films featuring the Boulder dam project. Upon its completion, Hoover Dam was further iconized in film, with many works of media using the dam to convey a sense of scale in their productions. Others focused on the dam's reputation as a great work of engineering. Following the massive cultural and economic expansion of Las Vegas, Hoover Dam became increasingly culturally tied to the city.

== Depictions in media ==
=== Film ===
- 1933 The plot of the film The Mysterious Rider involves a land dispute near the site of the-then newly begun dam. Footage of the dam's ongoing construction is used in the film.
- 1933 The comedy I Loved You Wednesday follows the life of the fictional Philip Fletcher, an engineer working on the Boulder Dam project.
- 1934 The Silver Streak features a team of doctors racing to transport an iron lung to the Hoover Dam after a worker is injured during construction.
- 1936 The protagonist of the drama film Boulder Dam works on the construction of the dam. The film's narrative see its protagonist's (Rusty) character develop as the dam is gradually constructed.
- 1946 Hoover Dam is seen in the short film Facing Your Danger as the ending point of the downriver journey the film documents.
- 1950 The penultimate encounter in the 1950 noir film 711 Ocean Drive sees the film's protagonist (Mal Granger) attempt to evade a police roadblock at the dam. After a pursuit through the dam's tunnels, Granger is killed on top of the dam in an ensuing gunfight.
- 1956 The trio of the film Hollywood or Bust ride along the highway in the red convertible that takes them from coast to coast and passed by the Boulder Dam.
- 1964 The protagonists of Viva Las Vegas view the Hoover Dam, along with other Las Vegas landmarks, as part of a montage.
- 1978 The dam is collapsed by an earthquake in Superman after the San Andreas Fault Line is triggered by a nuclear weapon.
- 1985 A comedic fight between the protagonists of Lost in America takes place on top of the dam and in one of the structure's power stations.
- 1985 The Hoover Dam makes an appearance during the intro of the documentary movie Pumping Iron II: The Women.
- 1992 A scene at the beginning of the military science-fiction action film Universal Soldier takes place on and inside the Hoover Dam, showing how titular characters of the film are deployed to the Hoover Dam to resolve a hostage situation.
- 1993 A scene in the movie Best of the Best II where Travis Brickley is found is set at Hoover Dam.
- 1996 In Beavis and Butt-Head Do America, Beavis and Butt-Head accidentally release the water behind the Hoover Dam, which cuts off the power to Las Vegas and causes a blackout.
- 1997 In Fools Rush In, Isabel (Salma Hayek) throws a coin into the Colorado River while driving across the top of the Hoover Dam.
- 1997 In Vegas Vacation (the fourth installment in National Lampoon’s Vacation film series), Clark Griswold and his family take a tour of the dam. Clark accidentally creates a leak in the dam's inside walkways. Clark then opens the wrong door and ends up outside. He takes a cable and swings himself across the dam and hits the dam wall. He is forced to climb the scaffolding to the very top to get out.
- 2003 In the film Disaster, the dam is blown up by a cult leader.
- 2005 The Penguins of Madagascar sometimes use the name of the dam as a minced oath.
- 2006 In the miniseries 10.5: Apocalypse, the dam collapses when Lake Mead starts to heat up and expand beyond the spillway's capacity.
- 2007 In Transformers, Hoover Dam is used to house the remains of the Decepticon leader Megatron, with the dam coming under attack by the Decepticons during the film.
- 2007 Hoover Dam is one of the stops the protagonist of Into the Wild makes during his road-trip through America.
- 2015 In the disaster film San Andreas, the dam is collapsed by a massive earthquake.

=== Television ===
- 1959 Hoover Dam is used as a stand-in for a fictional hydroelectric dam in an episode of Sea Hunt, "The Dam".
- 1975 In March, Hoover Dam appeared in an episode of The Rockford Files, "Roundabout", which starred James Garner.
- 2008 In the 2008 television special Life After People, The Dam is able to make the Las Vegas area one of the last places with electricity up to a year after people. However, the generators are brought down by the quagga mussel when they place themselves on the inside of a pipe, multiply on top of one another, and eventually completely block the diameter of the pipe, preventing cooling water from moving to a generator, and causing the generators to overheat and shut down, resulting in Las Vegas going dark permanently. The Dam finally collapses after 10,000 years after people due to erosion of its concrete and the cumulative effect of seismic activity. Its becomes one of the last great collapses.
- 2008 In the television documentary film Aftermath: Population Zero, the Hoover Dam survives despite most other dams on the Colorado River collapsing due to excessive water pressure. Once the Glen Canyon Dam collapses, the flood waters race downstream towards the Hoover Dam. The water passes over the dam, forming a roaring cascade of water that thunders downstream, sweeping away other dams and overwhelming everything in the way until it reaches the Gulf of California.
- 2013 Hoover Dam appeared on episode 26 of the third season of the Israeli edition of The Amazing Race and served as a Pit Stop.

=== Video games ===
- 1998 The Dam was a stage featured in the Vigilante 8 video game for the PlayStation and Nintendo 64. An updated version of the same map is also present in the 2008 quasi-remake of the same game, called Vigilante 8 Arcade for the Xbox 360.
- 1998 In Half-Life, the first map of the chapter "Surface Tension" takes place in a dam similar to Hoover Dam.
- 2000 The Dam appears in a level in Die Hard Trilogy 2.
- 2003 In the open-world racing game World Racing, the dam appears in the "Nevada" level and can be driven on by the player.
- 2004 A parody of the dam appears in Grand Theft Auto: San Andreas known as the Sherman Dam. It provides Las Venturas (the game's version of Las Vegas) with hydroelectric power and also regulates the height of the Sherman Reservoir behind it.
- 2007 A dam similar to the Hoover Dam appears as part of the larger Ragno Fortress complex in the Grageo Canyon in Ace Combat 6: Fires of Liberation.
- 2010 Hoover Dam plays a pivotal role in the post apocalyptic world of Fallout: New Vegas, where multiple factions attempt to control it and its vital electrical output. The final battle of the game takes place across the top of the dam and in its power stations.
- 2011 The dam appears as a level in Duke Nukem Forever. The plot of the game sees alien invaders using Hoover Dam's hydroelectric capacity to power a wormhole.
- 2013 The Über Dam in Gangstar Vegas is a parody of Hoover Dam.
- 2020 The player fights through a dam similar to Hoover Dam in the Half-Life remake Black Mesa during the chapter "Surface Tension".

=== Photography ===
- 1941–42 American landscape photographer Ansel Adams produced a series of photographs featuring the dam.

=== Literature ===
- 2001 In the Blake and Mortimer graphic novel "The Strange Encounter", the main villain plans to use a hydrogen bomb to destroy the Hoover Dam.
- 2007 In the Percy Jackson & the Olympians novel The Titan's Curse by Rick Riordan, the main characters travel to Hoover Dam on their way to complete their quest in San Francisco. While at the dam Percy first meets Rachel Elizabeth Dare, a mortal who can see through the Mist, before the heroes are ambushed by undead, skeletal warriors. After delaying the skeletons by starting a food fight in the cafeteria of the tourist centre, the group escapes from Hoover Dam; carried away to safety by automated metallic angel statues.
- 2015 In the Hot War Series novel Bombs Away by Harry Turtledove, Las Vegas was targeted for atomic bombing by the Soviet Union on March 2, 1951, but local air-defense was able to shoot down the bomber. In all likelihood, it was revealed that the Soviets weren't actually trying to bomb Las Vegas, but rather the Hoover Dam, which was located about 30 miles (48 kilometers) away from the city.
- 2018 The novel Lords of St. Thomas by Jackson Ellis tells the story of the last family to vacate the flooded town of St. Thomas, Nevada in 1938 following construction of the Hoover Dam and creation of Lake Mead. The narrator's father, Thomas Lord, takes a job with Six Companies.

=== Music ===
- 1956 "The Wild and Wooly West" sung by Dean Martin, Jerry Lewis and Pat Crowley mention the site of Boulder Dam when they ride from coast to coast.
- 1977 "(The) Highwayman" by Jimmy Webb does not mention the Hoover Dam by name but it includes a verse about a dam builder who fell into the concrete of a dam near "a place called Boulder on the wild Colorado". The song was famously covered by supergroup The Highwaymen.
- 1992 "Standing on the edge / Of the Hoover Dam / I'm on the centerline / Right between two states of mind" – Written by Bob Mould, "Hoover Dam" is a much beloved track on the album Copper Blue with Mould's then band Sugar.
