= Besides (Sugar album) =

1995 album by Sugar

Compilation album by Sugar
- Released: June 25, 1995
- Recorded: 1992–94
- Genre: Alternative rock
- Length: 69:57
- Label: Rykodisc
- Producers: Bob Mould, Lou Giordano

Sugar chronology
File Under: Easy Listening (1994)	Besides (1995)

Professional ratings
Review scores
Source	Rating
AllMusic	3/5 stars
The Encyclopedia of Popular Music	2/5 stars
MusicHound Rock: The Essential Album Guide	3/5 stars
The New Rolling Stone Album Guide	3.5/5 stars

Besides is a compilation album by the alternative rock band Sugar; it contains B-sides from the group's previously released singles. It also has live and remixed versions of existing tracks from the band's two full albums and one EP, as well as several studio and live versions of tracks that had been unavailable on any of their previous albums. The CD included a QuickTime video for the single "Gee Angel", although this was not advertised on the CD packaging.

== Critical reception ==
Trouser Press wrote that "the capper is a titanic version of the Who’s 'Armenia City in the Sky' (long a staple of the band’s live set), which trails a dayglo jet-stream that’s impossible to avoid getting swept up in."

== Track listing ==
All tracks are written by Bob Mould; except where indicated.

No.	Title	Writer(s)	A-Side	Length
1.	"Needle Hits E"		"Helpless" (US), "Changes" (UK)	3:21
2.	"If I Can't Change Your Mind" (Solo Mix)		"Helpless" (US), "Changes" (UK)	3:20
3.	"Try Again"		"Helpless" (US), "Changes" (UK)	4:42
4.	"Where Diamonds Are Halos" (live)	Barbe	"A Good Idea"	4:17
5.	"Armenia City in the Sky" (live)	Keen	"A Good Idea"	3:26
6.	"Clownmaster"		"If I Can't Change Your Mind"	3:20
7.	"Anyone" (live)	Barbe	"If I Can't Change Your Mind"	2:43
8.	"JC Auto" (live)		"Tilted"	6:02
9.	"Believe What You're Saying" (Campfire Mix)			3:52
10.	"Mind Is an Island"		"Your Favorite Thing"	3:39
11.	"Frustration"	Barbe	"Your Favorite Thing"	5:20
12.	"Going Home"		"Believe What You're Saying"	2:41
13.	"In the Eyes of My Friends"	Barbe	"Believe What You're Saying"	3:35
14.	"And You Tell Me"		"Believe What You're Saying"	5:03
15.	"After All the Roads Have Led to Nowhere" (live)		"Gee Angel"	3:21
16.	"Explode and Make Up" (live)		"Gee Angel"	4:41
17.	"The Slim" (live)		"Gee Angel"	6:26
18.	"Gee Angel" (CD-ROM track)

== The Joke Is Always on Us, Sometimes. ==
The Joke Is Always On Us, Sometimes.

Live album by Sugar
- Released: June 25, 1995
- Recorded: November 2, 1994
- Venues: First Avenue Minneapolis, Minnesota
- Genre: Alternative rock
- Length: 68:34
- Label: Rykodisc
- Producer: ?

Sugar chronology
File Under: Easy Listening (1994)	The Joke Is Always On Us, Sometimes. (1995)

Professional ratings
Review scores
Source	Rating
AllMusic	3/5 stars

The first 25,000 copies of Besides were packaged with a bonus disc titled The Joke Is Always on Us, Sometimes. The disc is a live Sugar concert from November 2, 1994, at First Avenue club in Minneapolis, Minnesota.

All tracks are written by Bob Mould; except where indicated.

No.	Title	Writer(s)	Length
1.	"Gift"		4:12
2.	"Company Book"	Barbe	3:28
3.	"Hoover Dam"		3:08
4.	"After All The Roads Have Led To Nowhere" (B-side of "Gee Angel")		3:42
5.	"Where Diamonds Are Halos"	Barbe	4:21
6.	"Slick"		4:04
7.	"Going Home"		2:13
8.	"Running Out Of Time"		2:29
9.	"Frustration"	Barbe	4:38
10.	"Changes"		3:44
11.	"Can't Help You Any More"		2:59
12.	"Helpless"		3:04
13.	"If I Can't Change Your Mind"		3:04
14.	"In The Eyes Of My Friends"	Barbe	3:12
15.	"Clownmaster" (B-side of "Gee Angel live")		2:43
16.	"Gee Angel" (A-side of "Gee Angel live")		4:17
17.	"Explode And Make Up" (B-side of "Gee Angel")		4:39
18.	"The Slim" (B-side of "Gee Angel")		8:36

== Charts ==
Chart (1995)	Peak position
Canada Top Albums/CDs (RPM)	34
US Billboard 200	122
