= Human Sexual Response (band) =

American new wave band

- Origin: Boston, Massachusetts, United States
- Genres: New wave
- Years active: 1977–1982
- Past members: Casey Cameron; Larry Bangor; Dini Lamot; Windle Davis; Malcolm Travis; Rich Gilbert; Rolfe Anderson; Chris Maclachlan

Human Sexual Response was an American new wave band formed in Boston in 1978. The band broke up in 1982.

== History ==
=== Formation and early years ===
Casey Cameron formed an all-kazoo band ("Kazoondheit") with her neighbors, among whom were Larry Bangor (aka Larry Soucy), Dini Lamot (brother of Larry and cousin to "Pecky" Lamot), and Windle Davis, who since 1974 had been Lamot's domestic partner. The four became fast friends and soon formed an a cappella country-and-western band called Honey Bea and the Meadow Muffins, who played at parties and in the subway. Encouraged, the four decided to start a rock band.

Posting ads, the quartet met three musician/composers, drummer Malcolm Travis, guitarist Rich Gilbert, and bass player Rolfe Anderson. These seven became the original lineup of HSR, with Anderson being replaced on bass by Chris Maclachlan in 1980. Bangor was the main lead singer, though Lamot, Davis, and Cameron each sometimes sang lead. They named the band after the groundbreaking, and now classic, Masters and Johnson best-seller.

=== Recordings ===
After Maclachlan joined the band, they recorded two full-length albums, Fig. 14 (1980) and In a Roman Mood (1981), as well as 1981's Pound EP. Their tune "Jackie Onassis", from Fig. 14, got airplay beyond college radio, while other songs, such as "What Does Sex Mean to Me?" and "Land of the Glass Pinecones," had more of a cult success.

Fig. 15 was a CD release in the '90s, and it contained all of Fig. 14 plus the song "Butt Fuck" that landed the band in hot water when they performed it on the live local overnight TV show Five All Night, Live All Night.

=== Post-breakup ===
Human Sexual Response broke up in 1982. Casey dropped out of show business and worked as a content developer for Sun Microsystems in the Bay Area. She is the mother of Cameron Mesirow, who makes music as Glasser, originally based in Los Angeles, prior to her move to New York. Travis, Gilbert, Bangor and Maclachlan went on to form a band, The Zulus (a/k/a Wild Kingdom, a/k/a Screaming Mimis, a/k/a the Gospel Birds) and released a self-titled LP in 1985, and then Down On The Floor in 1989 on Slash Records, produced by Bob Mould of Hüsker Dü. Malcolm Travis later played drums for Mould's Sugar, and for Kustomized.

Rich Gilbert was a member of Concussion Ensemble, Country Bumpkins, a project band called Clown, Frank Black and the Catholics, played on four Tanya Donelly solo releases, and currently plays pedal steel with Thad Cockerell. Upon moving to Nashville, Tennessee, Gilbert has gone on to perform with such artists as Jen Jones, and Travis Mann, and is currently teamed with drummer Steve Latination, bassist Zack Shedd, and vocalist Meat Johnson to form the local power quartet Meat and Three. From 2001-2003 he formed the Blackstone Valley Sinners, based in Pawtucket, Rhode Island, with Slim Cessna of Slim Cessna's Auto Club and Gilbert's then-wife Judith-Ann. In 2009 he began playing with Eileen Rose in The Silver Threads, a classic country honky tonk cover band.

Dini Lamot launched a new career as "Musty Chiffon." Aided by Windle Davis, Lamot/Chiffon recorded a dance version of "Jackie Onassis" in 1999. The two formerly operated a bed and breakfast in Hudson, NY, and at one time a local theater offering entertainment ranging from puppetry to drag shows. In the 1990s, Lamot and Davis relocated to Provincetown, Massachusetts and began doing odd jobs for artist Alice Brock; Brock, in turn, became a patron of Provincetown's burgeoning LGBTQ arts and entertainment community. Decades later, after Brock fell ill with various ailments, Lamot organized a fundraiser to allow her to stay in Provincetown. As of 2020, Lamot and Davis are still a couple and split their time between Sarasota, Florida and Portland, Maine.

The band reunited for special Halloween shows in 1984 at Spit and 1986 at The Channel, a New Year's Eve show in December 1988 at the Paradise, and on November 29, 2008 at Jason's Upstairs Bar in Hudson, NY. The band performed at the House of Blues in Boston on November 10, 2012 and November 3, 2017.

== Discography ==
=== Studio albums ===
- Fig. 14 (1980)
- In a Roman Mood (1981)
- Pound (1981 - EP)
- Fig. 15 (1992 - CD reissue of Fig. 14 LP with extra track)
