= Kustomized =

Post-punk band from Boston, MA

- Origin: Boston, Massachusetts, U.S.
- Genres: Post-punk; Noise rock
- Years active: 1993–1996
- Labels: Matador
- Past members: Peter Prescott; Bob Moses; Ed Yazijian; Kurt Davis; Malcolm Travis

Kustomized was an American indie rock band formed by former Mission of Burma and Volcano Suns member Peter Prescott.

== History ==
The band was formed by Prescott following the breakup of Volcano Suns in 1993, and consisted of Prescott (guitar, vocals), Bob Moses (bass guitar), Ed Yazijian (guitar, violin, organ, formerly of High Risk Group) and Kurt Davis, a.k.a. Yukki Gipe of Bullet LaVolta (drums). They toured in support of Yo La Tengo and Helium before signing to Matador Records. Kustomized released three albums on the Matador label between 1994 and 1996, the first two produced by Bob Weston, with comparisons being drawn to Mission of Burma, Gang of Four, and Joy Division, and with a stronger punk rock influence than Prescott's earlier bands. The band's final album, At the Vanishing Point, was recorded live in the studio, and featured Malcolm Travis (of Human Sexual Response and Sugar) on drums, replacing Davis.

The band split up in 1996, with Prescott subsequently forming The Peer Group, reforming Volcano Suns for some reunion shows and later rejoining the reformed Mission of Burma.

== Discography ==
=== Albums ===
- The Mystery of... (1994), Matador
- The Battle for Space (1995), Matador
- At the Vanishing Point (1996), Matador

=== Singles ===
- "The Day I Had Some Fun" (1995), Matador
