= Beaster =

Studio album by Sugar
- Released: April 6, 1993
- Studio: The Outpost, Stoughton, Massachusetts
- Genre: Alternative rock
- Length: 30:51
- Label: Creation, Rykodisc; CRELP 153
- Producer: Bob Mould, Lou Giordano

Sugar chronology
Copper Blue (1992)	Beaster (1993)	File Under: Easy Listening (1994)

Singles from Beaster
- 1. "Tilted" Released: 1993; 2. "JC Auto" Released: 1993

Beaster is a 1993 mini-album by Sugar. Its songs were recorded at the same time as the band's acclaimed first album, Copper Blue. However, Beaster has a much denser, heavier sound, closer in spirit to frontman Bob Mould's earlier band Hüsker Dü than to Copper Blue. "Lyrically it's so unnerving for me to listen to it…" said Mould. "Musically it's harder, it's a little looser. Lyrically, it's a lot wilder than Copper Blue… Copper Blue was such a great pop record that I just saw this as like the evil twin."

The loosely conceptual work is built around religious imagery, and was even released during Holy Week before Easter in 1993. "I still don't know what it's all about," said Mould after its release. "The Jesus thing everybody picks up on – those are words that are not used lightly. Just the notion of somebody who can do no wrong who eventually gets hung [sic] for doing no wrong. I think that everyone feels like a martyr sometimes."

== Background ==
Bob Mould said of Beaster:

I'm sure some people are going to perceive this as some sort of step backwards from the previous album. Some people will say it's self-indulgent. Almost anything short of community service usually is. People who have seen the band live will know this is not the case. This is the other side of Sugar that some people haven't seen yet, a style that we really enjoy. The presentation of the material is very demanding, very open to extrapolation, very fresh to us. You can make whatever you want out of it, that's what music is supposed to be about. Sometimes the experience of making music, or listening to music, shouldn't be overanalyzed and dissected. To me, that's what this piece of work is about.

== Reception ==
Professional ratings
Review scores
Source	Rating
AllMusic	4/5 stars
Chicago Tribune	3.5/4 stars
Entertainment Weekly	C+
Mojo	4/5 stars
NME	9/10
Orlando Sentinel	5/5 stars
Pitchfork	9.0/10
Q	4/5 stars
The Rolling Stone Album Guide	4/5 stars
Select	5/5

"Audibly a disciple of Hendrix, McGuinn and Page, and propelled by the supreme engine room of bassist David Barbe and drummer Malcolm Travis, Mould's sound is dense but never turgid," wrote Mat Snow for Q. "Better still, his melodic instinct to head for the heights of epiphany remains intact; though on the face of it not a song here should raise even the thinnest wintry smile, tune-wise they beam with vitality and engagement." A retrospective review in Q maintained the 4|5 rating. "Mould called Beaster 'the bad Sugar' (destined, sadly, to be followed by the 'crap Sugar' of File Under: Easy Listening)," wrote Danny Eccleston, "and alongside his solo Workbook, it's about the best thing in his bulging portfolio."

"It starts with an acoustic guitar," wrote David Cavanagh for Select, "achieves limitless levels of beauty in its 30 minutes and ends with the most gorgeous piece of music Bob Mould has been involved with since his heart-stopping solo on 'Green Eyes' off Flip Your Wig." "Rarely has a band rocked out with such bleak intensity and utter conviction," opined The Times. "A vast cathedral of noise and despair, erected and demolished in half an hour flat, this is an album which has to be heard to be believed."

"Sugar are about the turmoil of the interior life," observed Melody Maker, "which is maybe why an album like Beaster is best listened to loud on the headphones at home rather than live." "The dark but insidiously catchy companion to Copper Blue confirms what those in the know had predicted," concluded The Daily Telegraph, "Sugar are definitely The Next Big Thing."

== Track listing ==
=== Original Release ===
All tracks are written by Bob Mould, except as noted.

No.	Title	Length
1.	"Come Around"	4:52
2.	"Tilted"	4:08
3.	"Judas Cradle"	6:15
4.	"JC Auto"	6:13
5.	"Feeling Better"	6:22
6.	"Walking Away"	3:00

=== 2012 edition ===
2012 edition – Disc two – DVD
No.	Title	Writer(s)	Length
1.	"Tilted" (Promo video)
2.	"The Act We Act"
3.	"A Good Idea"
4.	"Changes"
5.	"Beer Commercial"	David Barbe

- DVD tracks 2 to 5 were filmed live at Finsbury Park June 13, 1993

== Personnel ==
=== Sugar ===
- Bob Mould – guitars, vocals, keyboards, percussion
- David Barbe – bass
- Malcolm Travis – Drums, Percussion

=== Technical personnel ===
- Bob Mould, Lou Giordano – producer, engineer
- Tom Bender – assistant mixing engineer
  - recorded at The Outpost, Stoughton, MA; mixed at Carriage House, Stamford, CT
- Howie Weinberg – mastering engineer
  - mastered at Masterdisk, New York
- Sandra-Lee Phipps, Russell Kaye – photography

== Charts ==
=== Album ===
Chart performance for Beaster
Chart (1993/2012)	Peak position
Australian Albums (ARIA)	94
Dutch Albums (Album Top 100)	68
New Zealand Albums (RMNZ)	18
UK Albums Chart	3
US Billboard Pop Albums	130
US Billboard Heatseekers Albums	4
US Billboard Heatseekers Albums	8^{[A]}
US Billboard Independent Albums	46^{[A]}

Note

- AChart placing refers to 2012 release Copper Blue/Beaster.

=== Single ===
Chart performance for singles from Beaster
Title	Chart (1993)	Peak position
"Tilted" b/w "JC Auto (Live)" (Limited edition 7")	UK Singles Chart	48
