= Hoover Dam =

Dam in Nevada and Arizona, US

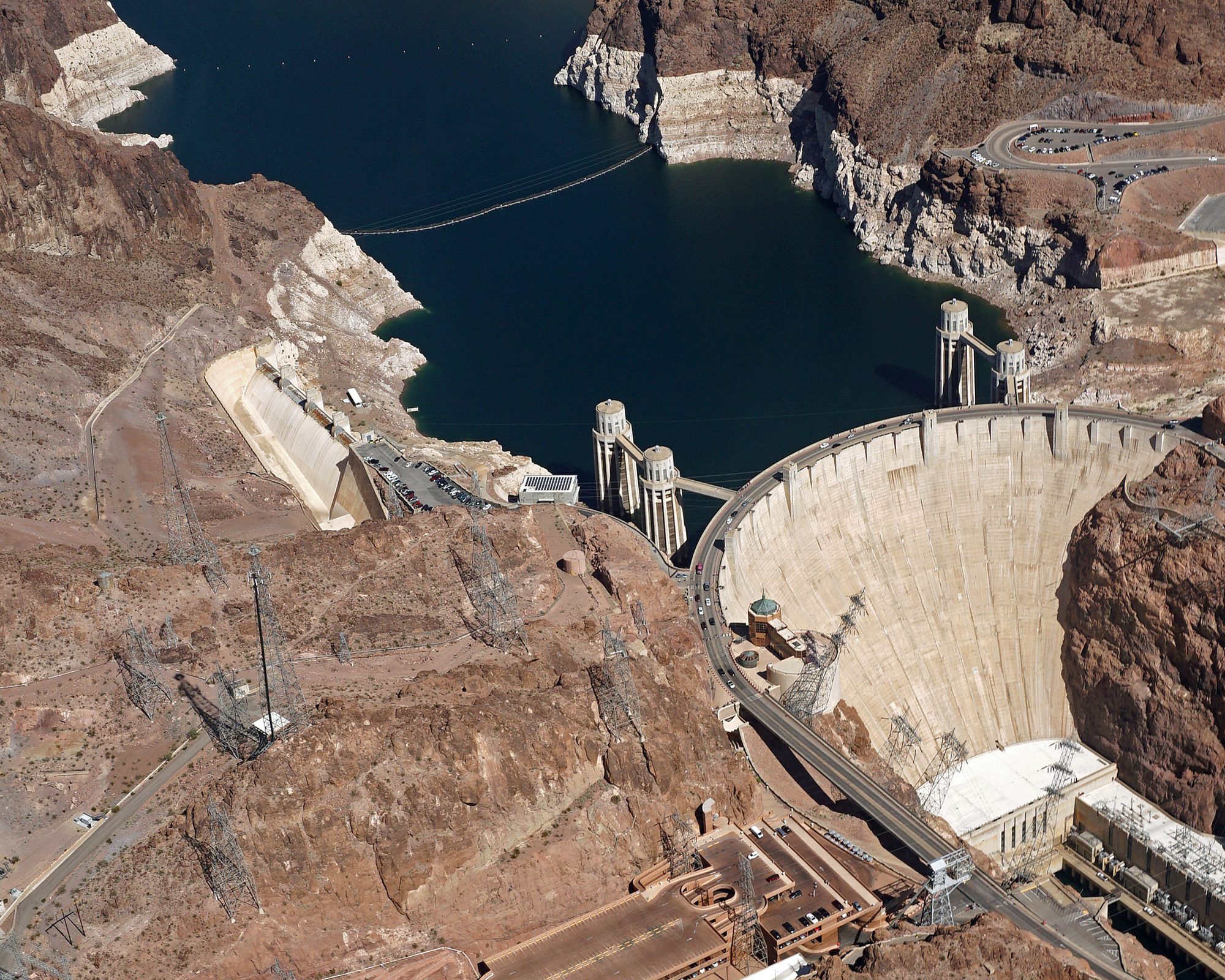
- Interactive map of Hoover Dam
- Location: Clark County, Nevada/Mohave County, Arizona, U.S.
- Purpose: Hydroelectricity, flood control, water storage, regulation, recreation
- Status: Operational
- Construction began: 1931 (95 years ago)
- Opening date: 1936 (90 years ago)
- Construction cost: $49 million (1931 budget) ($811 million in 2024 dollars)
- Owner: United States government
- Operator: U.S. Bureau of Reclamation

Dam and spillways
- Type of dam: Concrete gravity-arch dam
- Impounds: Colorado River
- Height: 726.4 ft (221.4 m)
- Length: 1,244 ft (379 m)
- Elevation at crest: 1,232 ft (376 m)
- Width (crest): 45 ft (14 m)
- Width (base): 660 ft (200 m)
- Dam volume: 3,250,000 cu yd (2,480,000 m^{3})
- Spillway type: 2 controlled drum gate, side channel
- Spillway capacity: 400,000 cu ft/s (11,000 m^{3}/s)

Reservoir
- Creates: Lake Mead
- Total capacity: 28,537,000 acre⋅ft (35.200 km^{3})
- Active capacity: 15,853,000 acre⋅ft (19.554 km^{3})
- Inactive capacity: 10,024,000 acre⋅ft (12.364 km^{3})
- Catchment area: 167,800 sq mi (435,000 km^{2})
- Surface area: 247 sq mi (640 km^{2})
- Maximum length: 112 mi (180 km)
- Maximum water depth: 590 ft (180 m)
- Normal elevation: 1,219 ft (372 m)

Power Station
- Operator: U.S. Bureau of Reclamation
- Commission date: 1936–1960
- Hydraulic head: 590 ft (180 m) (Max)
- Turbines: 13 × 130 MW; 2 × 127 MW; 1 × 68.5 MW; 1 × 61.5 MW Francis-type; 2 × 2.4 MW Pelton-type
- Installed capacity: 2,078.8 MW
- Capacity factor: 18%
- Annual generation: 3.3 TWh (12 PJ) (2020)
- Website; Official website
- Hoover Dam
- U.S. National Register of Historic Places
- U.S. National Historic Landmark
- Location within Nevada Location within the United States
- Coordinates: 36°0′56″N 114°44′16″W
- Architect: Six Companies, Inc. (structural), Gordon Kaufmann (exteriors)
- Architectural style: Art Deco
- MPS: Vehicular Bridges in Arizona MPS (AD)
- NRHP reference No.: 81000382

Significant dates
- First Power Generation: September 11, 1936
- Added to NRHP: April 8, 1981
- Designated NHL: August 20, 1985

The Hoover Dam is a concrete arch–gravity dam in the Black Canyon of the Colorado River, on the boundary between the U.S. states of Nevada and Arizona. Constructed between 1931 and 1936, during the Great Depression, it was dedicated on September 30, 1935, by President Franklin D. Roosevelt. Its construction was the result of a massive effort involving thousands of workers, and cost over 96 lives. Bills passed by Congress during its construction referred to it as Hoover Dam (after President Herbert Hoover), but the Roosevelt administration named it Boulder Dam. In 1947, Congress reinstated the name Hoover Dam.

Since about 1900, the Black Canyon and nearby Boulder Canyon had been investigated for their potential to support a dam that would control floods, provide irrigation water, and produce hydroelectric power. In 1928, Congress authorized the project. The winning bid to build the dam was submitted by a consortium named Six Companies, Inc., which began construction in early 1931. Such a large concrete structure had never been built before, and some of the techniques used were unproven. The torrid summer weather and lack of facilities near the site also presented difficulties. Nevertheless, the dam was turned over to the federal government on March 1, 1936, more than two years ahead of schedule.

Hoover Dam impounds Lake Mead and is located near Boulder City, Nevada, a municipality originally constructed for workers on the construction project, about 30 mi (48 km) southeast of Las Vegas, Nevada. The dam's generators provide power for public and private utilities in Nevada, Arizona, and California. Hoover Dam is a major tourist attraction, with 7 million tourists a year. The heavily traveled U.S. Route 93 (US 93) ran along the dam's crest until October 2010, when the Hoover Dam Bypass opened.

== Background ==
=== Search for resources ===
As the United States developed the Southwest, the Colorado River was seen as a potential source of irrigation water. An initial attempt at diverting the river for irrigation purposes occurred in the late 1890s, when land speculator William Beatty built the Alamo Canal just north of the Mexican border; the canal dipped into Mexico before running to a desolate area Beatty named the Imperial Valley. Though water from the Alamo Canal allowed for the widespread settlement of the valley, the canal proved expensive to operate. After a catastrophic breach that caused the Colorado River to fill the Salton Sea, the Southern Pacific Railroad spent $3 million in 1906–07 to stabilize the waterway, an amount it hoped in vain that it would be reimbursed for by the federal government. Even after the waterway was stabilized, it proved unsatisfactory because of constant disputes with landowners on the Mexican side of the border.

As the technology of electric power transmission improved, the Lower Colorado was considered for its hydroelectric-power potential. In 1902, the Edison Electric Company of Los Angeles surveyed the river in the hope of building a 40-foot (12 m) rock dam which could generate 10,000 horsepower (7,500 kW). However, at the time, the limit of transmission of electric power was 80 miles (130 km), and there were few customers (mostly mines) within that limit. Edison allowed land options it held on the river to lapse—including an option for what became the site of Hoover Dam.

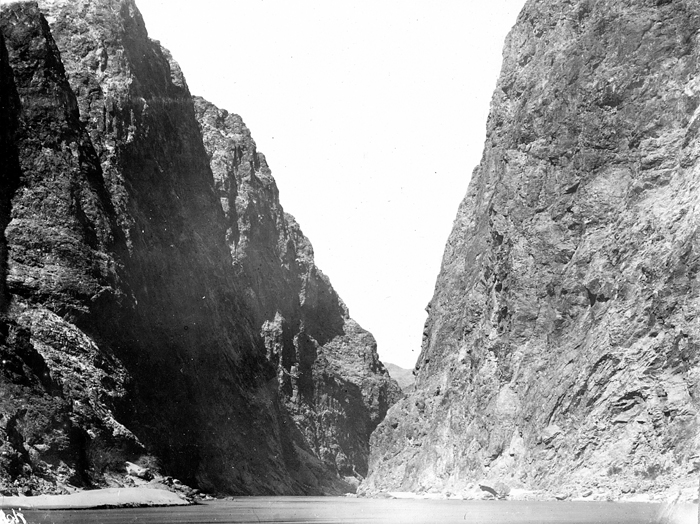
River view of the future dam site, c. 1904

In the following years, the Bureau of Reclamation (BOR), known as the Reclamation Service at the time, also considered the Lower Colorado as the site for a dam. Service chief Arthur Powell Davis proposed using dynamite to collapse the walls of Boulder Canyon, 20 miles (32 km) north of the eventual dam site, into the river. The river would carry off the smaller pieces of debris, and a dam would be built incorporating the remaining rubble. In 1922, after considering it for several years, the Reclamation Service finally rejected the proposal, citing doubts about the unproven technique and questions as to whether it would, in fact, save money.

=== Planning and agreements ===
In 1922, the Reclamation Service presented a report calling for the development of a dam on the Colorado River for flood control and electric power generation. The report was principally authored by Davis and was called the Fall-Davis report after Interior Secretary Albert Fall. The Fall-Davis report cited use of the Colorado River as a federal concern because the river's basin covered several states, and the river eventually entered Mexico. Though the Fall-Davis report called for a dam "at or near Boulder Canyon", the Reclamation Service (which was renamed the Bureau of Reclamation the following year) found that canyon unsuitable. One potential site at Boulder Canyon was bisected by a geologic fault; two others were so narrow there was no space for a construction camp at the bottom of the canyon or for a spillway. The Service investigated Black Canyon and found it ideal; a railway could be laid from the railhead in Las Vegas to the top of the dam site. Despite the site change, the dam project was referred to as the "Boulder Canyon Project".

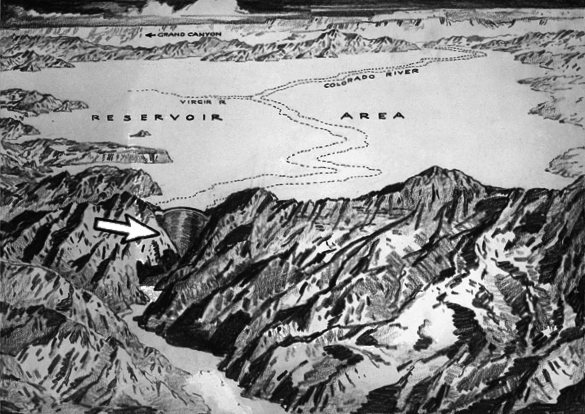
Sketch of the proposed dam site and reservoir, c. 1921

With little guidance on water allocation from the Supreme Court, proponents of the dam feared endless litigation. Delph Carpenter, a Colorado attorney, proposed that the seven states which fell within the river's basin (California, Nevada, Arizona, Utah, New Mexico, Colorado and Wyoming) form an interstate compact, with the approval of Congress. Such compacts were authorized by Article I of the United States Constitution but had never been concluded among more than two states. In 1922, representatives of seven states met with then-Secretary of Commerce Herbert Hoover. Initial talks produced no result, but when the Supreme Court handed down the Wyoming v. Colorado decision undermining the claims of the upstream states, they became anxious to reach an agreement. The resulting Colorado River Compact was signed on November 24, 1922.

Legislation to authorize the dam was introduced repeatedly by two California Republicans, Representative Phil Swing and Senator Hiram Johnson, but representatives from other parts of the country considered the project as hugely expensive and one that would mostly benefit California. The 1927 Mississippi flood made Midwestern and Southern congressmen and senators more sympathetic toward the dam project. On March 12, 1928, the failure of the St. Francis Dam, constructed by the city of Los Angeles, caused a disastrous flood that killed up to 600 people. As that dam was a curved-gravity type, similar in design to the arch-gravity as was proposed for the Black Canyon dam, opponents claimed that the Black Canyon dam's safety could not be guaranteed. Congress authorized a board of engineers to review plans for the proposed dam. The Colorado River Board found the project feasible, but warned that should the dam fail, every downstream Colorado River community would be destroyed, and that the river might change course and empty into the Salton Sea. The Board cautioned: "To avoid such possibilities, the proposed dam should be constructed on conservative if not ultra-conservative lines."

On December 21, 1928, President Coolidge signed the bill authorizing the dam. The Boulder Canyon Project Act appropriated $165 million for the project along with the downstream Imperial Dam and All-American Canal, a replacement for Beatty's canal entirely on the U.S. side of the border. It also permitted the compact to go into effect when at least six of the seven states approved it. This occurred on March 6, 1929, with Utah's ratification; Arizona did not approve it until 1944.

=== Design, preparation and contracting ===
Even before Congress approved the Boulder Canyon Project, the Bureau of Reclamation was considering what kind of dam should be used. Officials eventually decided on a massive concrete arch-gravity dam, the design of which was overseen by the Bureau's chief design engineer John L. Savage. The monolithic dam would be thick at the bottom and thin near the top and would present a convex face towards the water above the dam. The curving arch of the dam would transmit the water's force into the abutments, in this case the rock walls of the canyon. The wedge-shaped dam would be 660 ft (200 m) thick at the bottom, narrowing to 45 ft (14 m) at the top, leaving room for a highway connecting Nevada and Arizona.

On January 10, 1931, the Bureau made the bid documents available to interested parties, at five dollars a copy. The government was to provide the materials, and the contractor was to prepare the site and build the dam. The dam was described in minute detail, covering 100 pages of text and 76 drawings. A $2 million bid bond was to accompany each bid; the winner would have to post a $5 million performance bond. The contractor had seven years to build the dam, or penalties would ensue.

The Wattis Brothers, heads of the Utah Construction Company, were interested in bidding on the project, but lacked the money for the performance bond. They lacked sufficient resources even in combination with their longtime partners, Morrison-Knudsen, which employed the nation's leading dam builder, Frank Crowe. They formed a joint venture to bid for the project with Pacific Bridge Company of Portland, Oregon; Henry J. Kaiser & W. A. Bechtel Company of San Francisco; MacDonald & Kahn Ltd. of Los Angeles; and the J.F. Shea Company of Portland, Oregon. The joint venture was called Six Companies, Inc. as Bechtel and Kaiser were considered one company for purposes of Six in the name. The name was descriptive and was an inside joke among the San Franciscans in the bid, where "Six Companies" was also a Chinese benevolent association in the city. There were three valid bids, and Six Companies' bid of $48,890,955 was the lowest, within $24,000 of the confidential government estimate of what the dam would cost to build, and five million dollars less than the next-lowest bid.

The city of Las Vegas had lobbied hard to be the headquarters for the dam construction, closing its many speakeasies when the decision maker, Secretary of the Interior Ray Wilbur, came to town. Instead, Wilbur announced in early 1930 that a model city was to be built in the desert near the dam site. This town became known as Boulder City, Nevada. Construction of a rail line joining Las Vegas and the dam site began in September 1930.

== Construction ==
=== Labor force ===
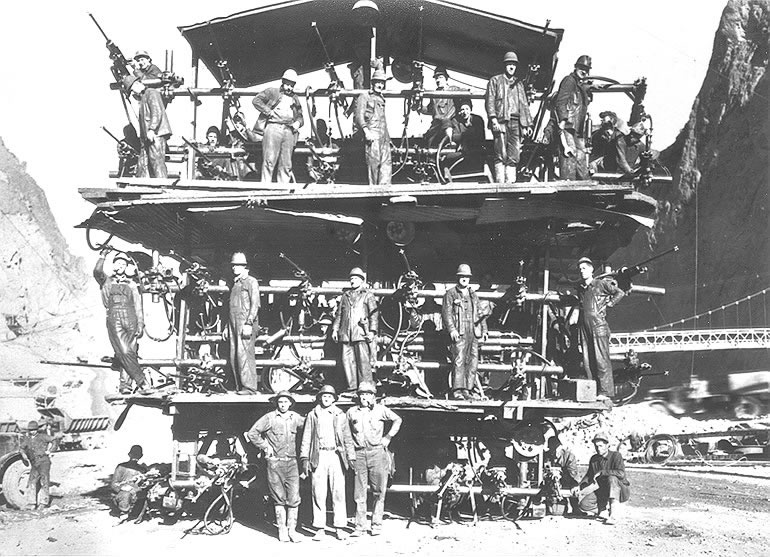
Workers on a "Jumbo Rig"; used for drilling the Hoover Dam's tunnels

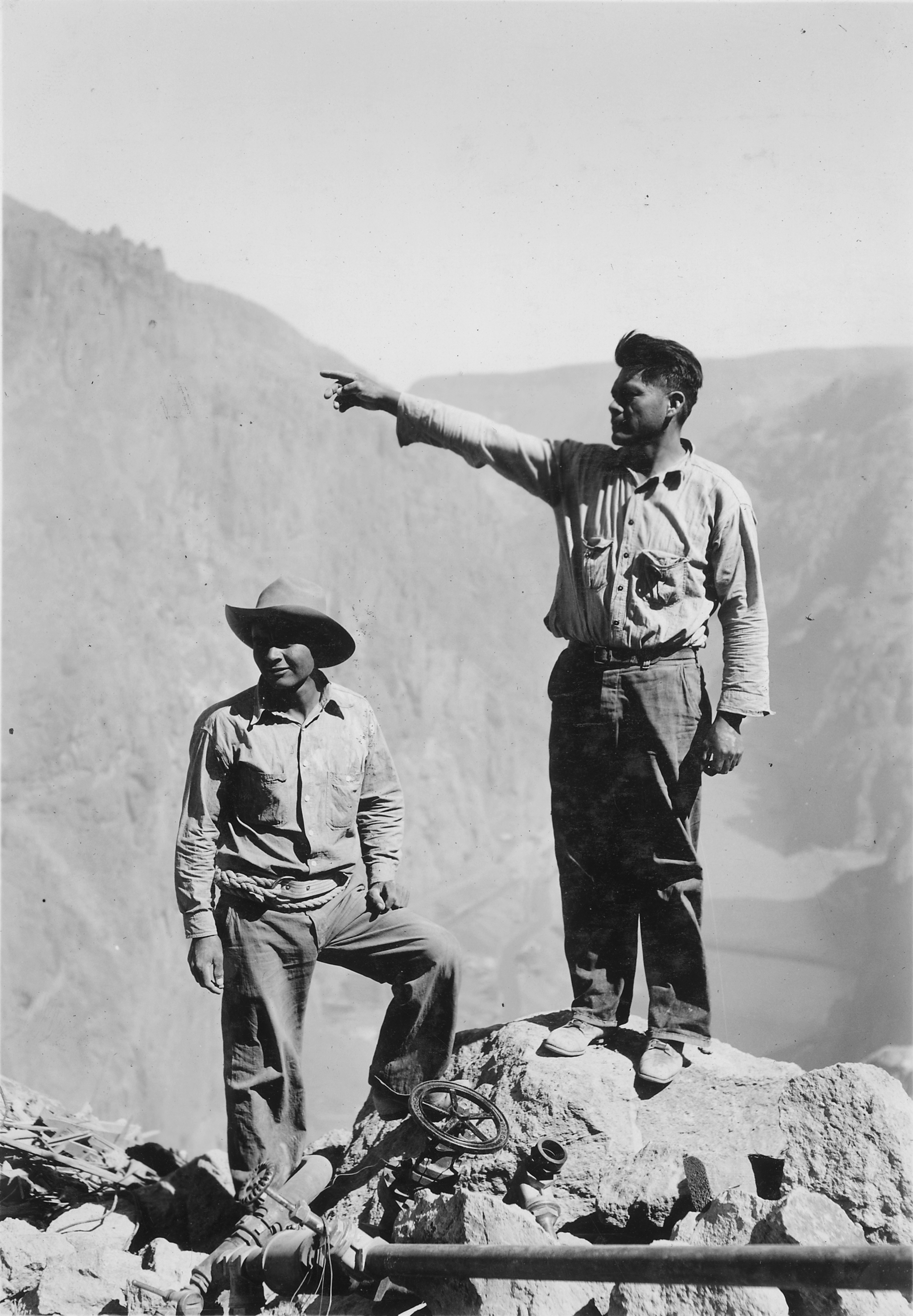
"Apache Indians employed as high-scalers on the construction of Hoover Dam." – NARA

Soon after the dam was authorized, increasing numbers of unemployed people converged on southern Nevada. Las Vegas, then a small city of some 5,000, saw between 10,000 and 20,000 unemployed descend on it. A government camp was established for surveyors and other personnel near the dam site; this soon became surrounded by a squatters' camp. Known as McKeeversville, the camp was home to men hoping for work on the project, together with their families. Another camp, on the flats along the Colorado River, was officially called Williamsville, but was known to its inhabitants as "Ragtown". When construction began, Six Companies hired large numbers of workers, with more than 3,000 on the payroll by 1932 and with employment peaking at 5,251 in July 1934. "Mongolian" (Chinese) labor was prevented by the construction contract, while the number of black people employed by Six Companies never exceeded thirty, mostly lowest-pay-scale laborers in a segregated crew, who were issued separate water buckets.

As part of the contract, Six Companies, Inc. was to build Boulder City to house the workers. The original timetable called for Boulder City to be built before the dam project began, but President Hoover ordered work on the dam to begin in March 1931 rather than in October. The company built bunkhouses, attached to the canyon wall, to house 480 single men at what became known as River Camp. Workers with families were left to provide their own accommodations until Boulder City could be completed, and many lived in Ragtown. The site of Hoover Dam endures extremely hot weather, and the summer of 1931 was especially torrid, with the daytime high averaging 119.9 °F (48.8 °C). Sixteen workers and other riverbank residents died of heat prostration between June 25 and July 26, 1931.

Mabel Macferran Rockwell was the only woman involved in the design and installation of the power generating machinery for Hoover Dam. She worked on the economic design of the company's transmission for the dam, which was the basis for her prize-winning paper "Power Limits of 220 Kv Transmission Lines" (co-authored with A. A. Kroneberg).

The Industrial Workers of the World (IWW or "Wobblies"), though much-reduced from their heyday as militant labor organizers in the early years of the century, hoped to unionize the Six Companies workers by capitalizing on their discontent. They sent eleven organizers, several of whom were arrested by Las Vegas police. On August 7, 1931, the company cut wages for all tunnel workers. Although the workers sent the organizers away, not wanting to be associated with the "Wobblies", they formed a committee to represent them with the company. The committee drew up a list of demands that evening and presented them to Crowe the following morning. He was noncommittal. The workers hoped that Crowe, the general superintendent of the job, would be sympathetic; instead, he gave a scathing interview to a newspaper, describing the workers as "malcontents".

On the morning of the 9th, Crowe met with the committee and told them that management refused their demands, was stopping all work, and was laying off the entire work force, except for a few office workers and carpenters. The workers were given until 5 p.m. to vacate the premises. Concerned that a violent confrontation was imminent, most workers took their paychecks and left for Las Vegas to await developments. Two days later, the remainder were talked into leaving by law enforcement. On August 13, the company began hiring workers again, and two days later, the strike was called off. While the workers received none of their demands, the company guaranteed there would be no further reductions in wages. Living conditions began to improve as the first residents moved into Boulder City in late 1931.

A second labor action took place in July 1935, as construction on the dam wound down. When a Six Companies manager altered working times to force workers to take lunch on their own time, workers responded with a strike. Emboldened by Crowe's reversal of the lunch decree, workers raised their demands to include a $1-per-day raise. The company agreed to ask the Federal government to supplement the pay, but no money was forthcoming from Washington. The strike ended.

=== River diversion ===
Before the dam could be built, the Colorado River needed to be diverted away from the construction site. To accomplish this, four diversion tunnels were driven through the canyon walls, two on the Nevada side and two on the Arizona side. These tunnels were 56 ft (17 m) in diameter. Their combined length was nearly 16,000 ft, or more than 3 miles (5 km). The contract required these tunnels to be completed by October 1, 1933, with a $3,000-per-day fine to be assessed for any delay. To meet the deadline, Six Companies had to complete work by early 1933, since only in late fall and winter was the water level in the river low enough to safely divert.

Tunneling began at the lower portals of the Nevada tunnels in May 1931. Shortly afterward, work began on two similar tunnels in the Arizona canyon wall. In March 1932, work began on lining the tunnels with concrete. First the base, or invert, was poured. Gantry cranes, running on rails through the entire length of each tunnel were used to place the concrete. The sidewalls were poured next. Movable sections of steel forms were used for the sidewalls. Finally, using pneumatic guns, the overheads were filled in. The concrete lining is 3 feet (1 m) thick, reducing the finished tunnel diameter to 50 ft (15 m). The river was diverted into the two Arizona tunnels on November 13, 1932; the Nevada tunnels were kept in reserve for high water. This was done by exploding a temporary cofferdam protecting the Arizona tunnels while at the same time dumping rubble into the river until its natural course was blocked.

Following the completion of the dam, the entrances to the two outer diversion tunnels were sealed at the opening and halfway through the tunnels with large concrete plugs. The downstream halves of the tunnels following the inner plugs are now the main bodies of the spillway tunnels. The inner diversion tunnels were plugged at approximately one-third of their length, beyond which they now carry steel pipes connecting the intake towers to the power plant and outlet works. The inner tunnels' outlets are equipped with gates that can be closed to drain the tunnels for maintenance.

=== Groundworks, rock clearance and grout curtain ===
To protect the construction site from the Colorado River and to facilitate the river's diversion, two cofferdams were constructed. Work on the upper cofferdam began in September 1932, even though the river had not yet been diverted. The cofferdams were designed to protect against the possibility of the river's flooding a site at which two thousand men might be at work, and their specifications were covered in the bid documents in nearly as much detail as the dam itself. The upper cofferdam was 96 ft (29 m) high, and 750 feet (230 m) thick at its base, thicker than the dam itself. It contained 650,000 cubic yards (500,000 m^{3}) of material.

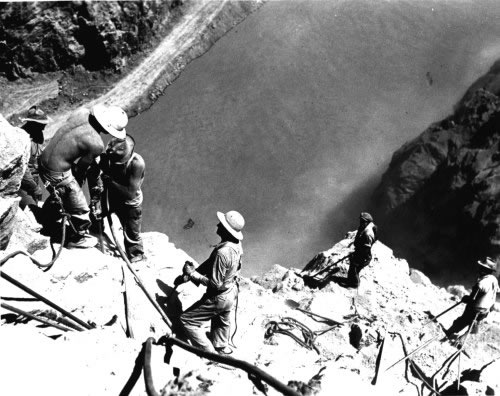
Looking down at "high scalers" above the Colorado River

When the cofferdams were in place and the construction site was drained of water, excavation for the dam foundation began. For the dam to rest on solid rock, it was necessary to remove accumulated erosion soils and other loose materials in the riverbed until sound bedrock was reached. Work on the foundation excavations was completed in June 1933. During this excavation, approximately 1,500,000 cu yd (1,100,000 m^{3}) of material was removed. Since the dam was an arch-gravity type, the side-walls of the canyon would bear the force of the impounded lake. Therefore, the side-walls were also excavated to reach virgin rock, as weathered rock might provide pathways for water seepage. Shovels for the excavation came from the Marion Power Shovel Company.

The men who removed this rock were called "high scalers". While suspended from the top of the canyon with ropes, the high-scalers climbed down the canyon walls and removed the loose rock with jackhammers and dynamite. Falling objects were the most common cause of death on the dam site; the high scalers' work thus helped ensure worker safety. One high scaler was able to save a life in a more direct manner: when a government inspector lost his grip on a safety line and began tumbling down a slope towards almost certain death, a high scaler was able to intercept him and pull him into the air. The construction site had become a magnet for tourists. The high scalers were prime attractions and showed off for the watchers. The high scalers received considerable media attention, with one worker dubbed the "Human Pendulum" for swinging co-workers (and, at other times, cases of dynamite) across the canyon. To protect themselves against falling objects, some high scalers dipped cloth hats in tar and allowed them to harden. When workers wearing such headgear were struck hard enough to inflict broken jaws, they sustained no skull damage. Six Companies ordered thousands of what initially were called "hard boiled hats" (later "hard hats") and strongly encouraged their use.

The cleared, underlying rock foundation of the dam site was reinforced with grout, forming a grout curtain. Holes were driven into the walls and base of the canyon, as deep as 150 feet (46 m) into the rock, and any cavities encountered were to be filled with grout. This was done to stabilize the rock, to prevent water from seeping past the dam through the canyon rock, and to limit "uplift"—upward pressure from water seeping under the dam. The workers were under severe time constraints due to the beginning of the concrete pour. When they encountered hot springs or cavities too large to readily fill, they moved on without resolving the problem. A total of 58 of the 393 holes were incompletely filled. After the dam was completed and the lake began to fill, large numbers of significant leaks caused the Bureau of Reclamation to examine the situation. It found that the work had been incompletely done, and was based on less than a full understanding of the canyon's geology. New holes were drilled from inspection galleries inside the dam into the surrounding bedrock. It took nine years (1938–47) under relative secrecy to complete the supplemental grout curtain.

=== Concrete ===
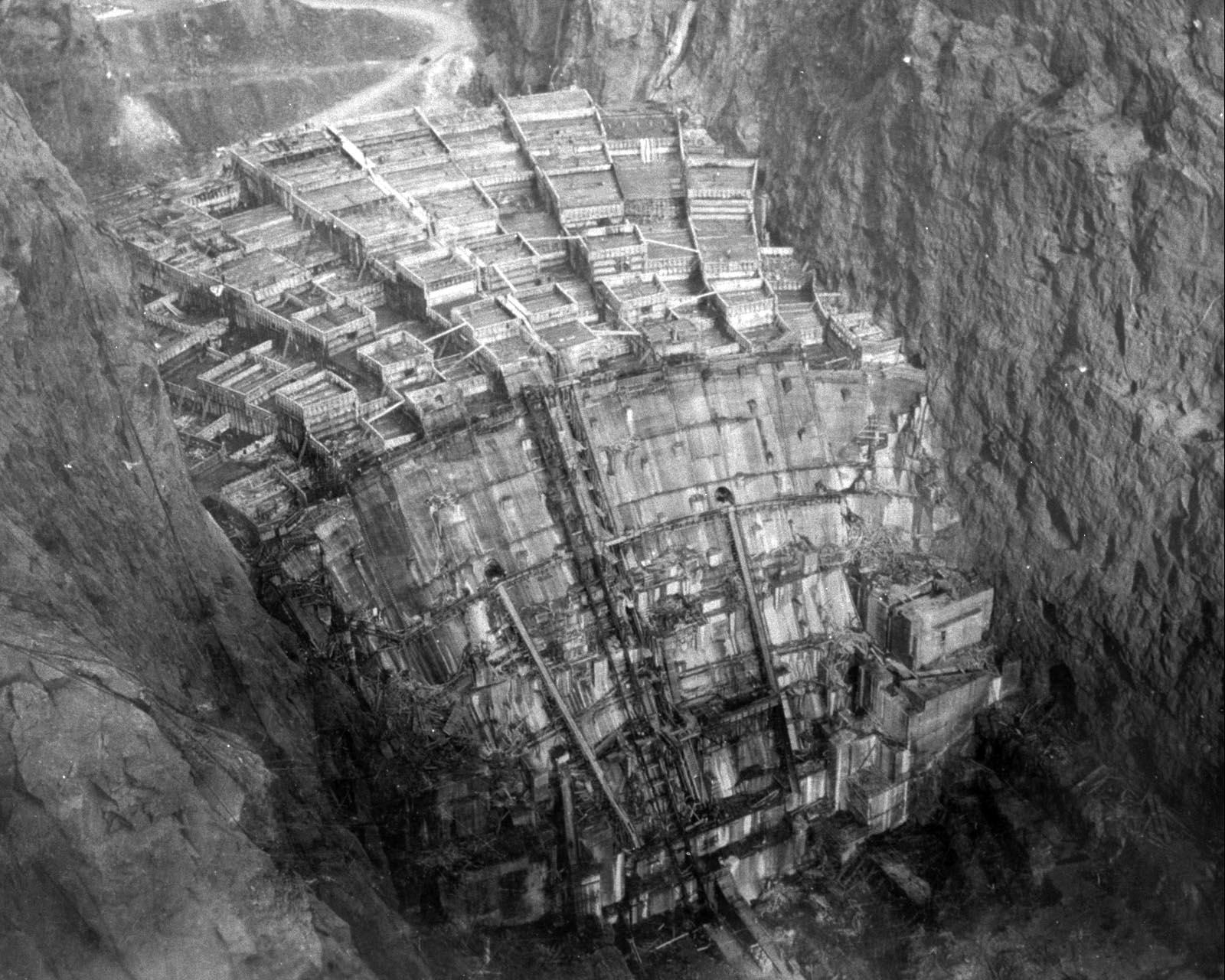
Columns of Hoover Dam being filled with concrete, February 1934 (looking upstream from the Nevada rim)

The first concrete was poured into the dam on June 6, 1933, 18 months ahead of schedule. Since concrete heats and contracts as it cures, the potential for uneven cooling and contraction of the concrete posed a serious problem. Bureau of Reclamation engineers calculated that if the dam were to be built in a single continuous pour, the concrete would take 125 years to cool, and the resulting stresses would cause the dam to crack and crumble. Instead, the ground where the dam would rise was marked with rectangles, and concrete blocks in columns were poured, some as large as 50 ft square (15 m) and 5 feet (1.5 m) high. Each five-foot form contained a set of 1-inch (25 mm) steel pipes; cool river water would be poured through the pipes, followed by ice-cold water from a refrigeration plant. When an individual block had cured and had stopped contracting, the pipes were filled with grout. Grout was also used to fill the hairline spaces between columns, which were grooved to increase the strength of the joints.

The concrete was delivered in huge steel buckets 7 feet high (2.1 m) and almost 7 feet in diameter; Crowe was awarded two patents for their design. These buckets, which weighed 20 short tons (18.1 t; 17.9 long tons) when full, were filled at two massive concrete plants on the Nevada side, and were delivered to the site in special railcars. The buckets were then suspended from aerial cableways which were used to deliver the bucket to a specific column. As the required grade of aggregate in the concrete differed depending on placement in the dam (from pea-sized gravel to 9 inches [230 mm] stones), it was vital that the bucket be maneuvered to the proper column. When the bottom of the bucket opened up, disgorging 8 cu yd (6.1 m^{3}) of concrete, a team of men worked it throughout the form. Although there are myths that men were caught in the pour and are entombed in the dam to this day, each bucket deepened the concrete in a form by only 1 inch (25 mm), and Six Companies engineers would not have permitted a flaw caused by the presence of a human body.

A total of 3,250,000 cubic yards (2,480,000 cubic meters) of concrete was used in the dam before concrete pouring ceased on May 29, 1935. In addition, 1,110,000 cu yd (850,000 m^{3}) were used in the power plant and other works. More than 582 miles (937 km) of cooling pipes were placed within the concrete. Overall, there is enough concrete in the dam to pave a two-lane highway from San Francisco to New York. Concrete cores were removed from the dam for testing in 1995; they showed that "Hoover Dam's concrete has continued to slowly gain strength" and the dam is composed of a "durable concrete having a compressive strength exceeding the range typically found in normal mass concrete". Hoover Dam concrete is not subject to alkali–silica reaction (ASR), as the Hoover Dam builders happened to use nonreactive aggregate, unlike that at downstream Parker Dam, where ASR has caused measurable deterioration.

=== Dedication and completion ===
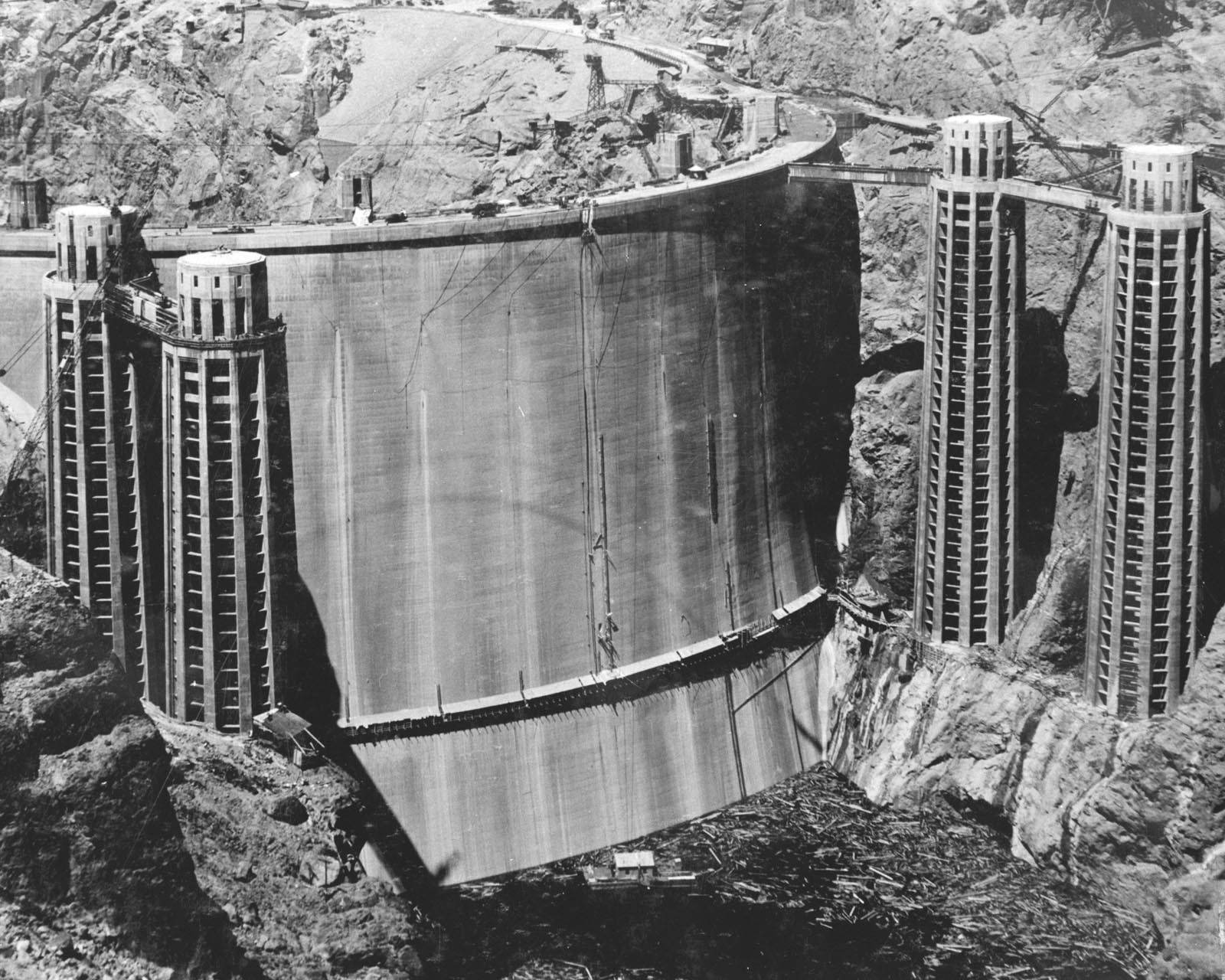
The upstream face of Hoover Dam slowly disappears as Lake Mead fills, May 1935 (looking downstream from the Arizona rim)

With most work finished on the dam itself (the powerhouse remained uncompleted), a formal dedication ceremony was arranged for September 30, 1935, to coincide with a western tour being made by President Franklin D. Roosevelt. The morning of the dedication, it was moved forward three hours from 2 p.m. Pacific time to 11 a.m.; this was done because Secretary of the Interior Harold L. Ickes had reserved a radio slot for the President for 2 p.m. but officials did not realize until the day of the ceremony that the slot was for 2 p.m. Eastern Time. Despite the change in the ceremony time, and temperatures of 102 °F (39 °C), 10,000 people were present for the President's speech, in which he avoided mentioning the name of former President Hoover, who was not invited to the ceremony. To mark the occasion, a three-cent stamp was issued by the United States Post Office Department—bearing the name "Boulder Dam", the official name of the dam between 1933 and 1947. After the ceremony, Roosevelt made the first visit by any American president to Las Vegas.

Most work had been completed by the dedication, and Six Companies negotiated with the government through late 1935 and early 1936 to settle all claims and arrange for the formal transfer of the dam to the Federal Government. The parties came to an agreement and on March 1, 1936, Secretary Ickes formally accepted the dam on behalf of the government. Six Companies was not required to complete work on one item, a concrete plug for one of the bypass tunnels, as the tunnel had to be used to take in irrigation water until the powerhouse went into operation.

=== Construction deaths ===
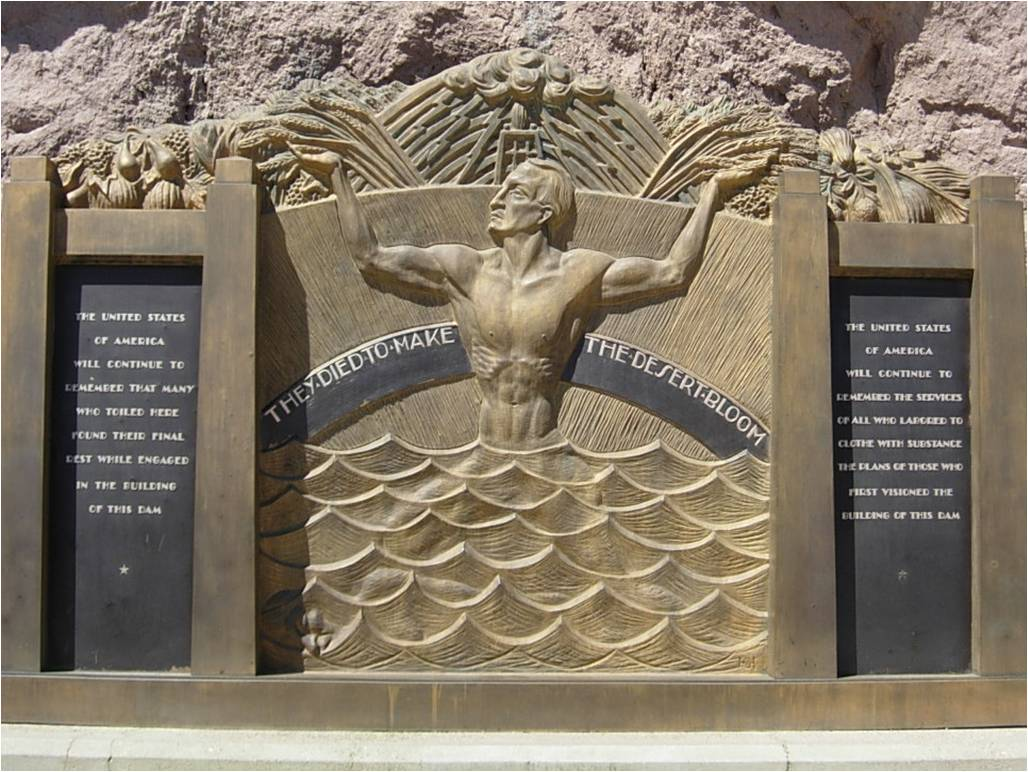
Oskar J. W. Hansen's memorial at the dam which reads in part "They died to make the desert bloom."

There were 112 deaths reported as associated with the construction of the dam. The first was Bureau of Reclamation employee Harold Connelly who died on May 15, 1921, after falling from a barge while surveying the Colorado River for an ideal spot for the dam. Surveyor John Gregory ("J.G.") Tierney, who drowned on December 20, 1922, in a flash flood while looking for an ideal spot for the dam was the second person. The official list's final death occurred on December 20, 1935, when Patrick Tierney, electrician's helper and the son of J.G. Tierney, fell from one of the two Arizona-side intake towers. Included in the fatality list are three workers who took their own lives on site, one in 1932 and two in 1933. Of the 112 fatalities, 91 were Six Companies employees, three were Bureau of Reclamation employees, and one was a visitor to the site; the remainder were employees of various contractors not part of Six Companies.

Ninety-six of the deaths occurred during construction at the site. Not included in the official number of fatalities were deaths that were recorded as pneumonia. Workers alleged that this diagnosis was a cover for death from carbon monoxide poisoning (brought on by the use of gasoline-fueled vehicles in the diversion tunnels), and a classification used by Six Companies to avoid paying compensation claims. The site's diversion tunnels frequently reached 140 °F (60 °C), enveloped in thick plumes of vehicle exhaust gases. A total of 42 workers were recorded as having died from pneumonia and were not included in the above total; none were listed as having died from carbon monoxide poisoning. No deaths of non-workers from pneumonia were recorded in Boulder City during the construction period.

=== Architectural style ===
The initial plans for the facade of the dam, the power plant, the outlet tunnels and ornaments clashed with the modern look of an arch dam. The Bureau of Reclamation, more concerned with the dam's functionality, adorned it with a Gothic-inspired balustrade and eagle statues. This initial design was criticized by many as being too plain and unremarkable for a project of such immense scale, so Los Angeles-based architect Gordon B. Kaufmann, then the supervising architect to the Bureau of Reclamation, was brought in to redesign the exteriors. Kaufmann greatly streamlined the design and applied an elegant Art Deco style to the entire project. He designed sculpted turrets rising seamlessly from the dam face and clock faces on the intake towers set for the time in Nevada and Arizona—both states are in different time zones, but since Arizona does not observe daylight saving time, the clocks display the same time for more than half the year.

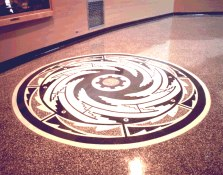
Tile floor designed by Allen Tupper True

At Kaufmann's request, Denver artist Allen Tupper True was hired to handle the design and decoration of the walls and floors of the new dam. True's design scheme incorporated motifs of the Navajo and Pueblo tribes of the region. Although some were initially opposed to these designs, True was given the go-ahead and was officially appointed consulting artist. With the assistance of the National Laboratory of Anthropology, True researched authentic decorative motifs from Indian sand paintings, textiles, baskets and ceramics. The images and colors are based on Native American visions of rain, lightning, water, clouds, and local animals—lizards, serpents, birds—and on the Southwestern landscape of stepped mesas. In these works, which are integrated into the walkways and interior halls of the dam, True also reflected on the machinery of the operation, making the symbolic patterns appear both ancient and modern.

With the agreement of Kaufmann and the engineers, True also devised for the pipes and machinery an innovative color-coding which was implemented throughout all BOR projects. True's consulting artist job lasted through 1942; it was extended so he could complete design work for the Parker, Shasta and Grand Coulee dams and power plants. True's work on the Hoover Dam was humorously referred to in a poem published in The New Yorker, part of which read, "lose the spark, and justify the dream; but also worthy of remark will be the color scheme".

Complementing Kaufmann and True's work, sculptor Oskar J. W. Hansen designed many of the sculptures on and around the dam. His works include the monument of dedication plaza, a plaque to memorialize the workers killed and the bas-reliefs on the elevator towers. In his words, Hansen wanted his work to express "the immutable calm of intellectual resolution, and the enormous power of trained physical strength, equally enthroned in placid triumph of scientific accomplishment", because "[t]he building of Hoover Dam belongs to the sagas of the daring." Hansen's dedication plaza, on the Nevada abutment, contains a sculpture of two winged figures flanking a flagpole.

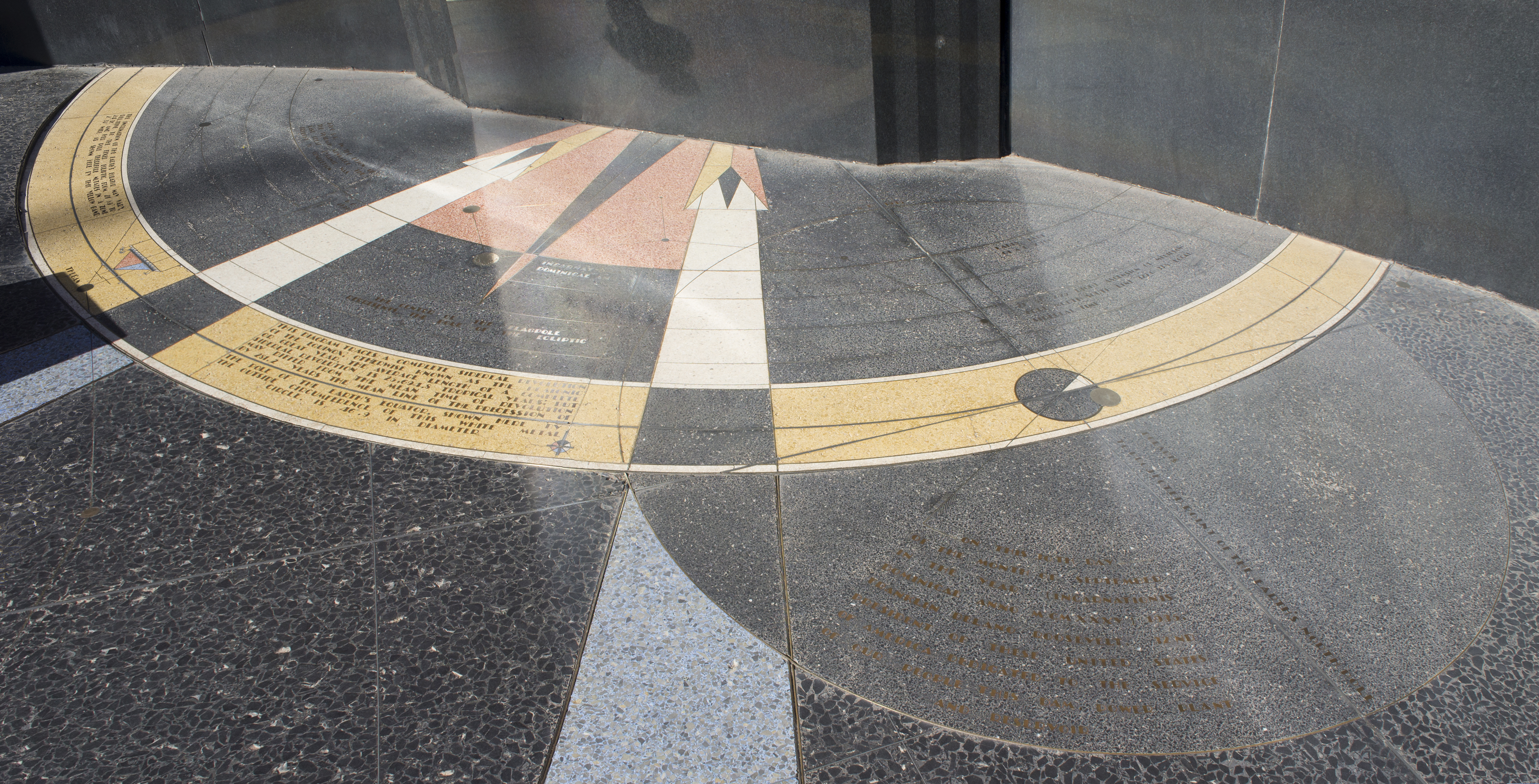
Hoover Dam memorial star map floor, center area

Surrounding the base of the monument is a terrazzo floor embedded with a "star map". The map depicts the Northern Hemisphere sky at the moment of President Roosevelt's dedication of the dam. This is intended to help future astronomers, if necessary, calculate the exact date of dedication. The 30-foot-high (9.1 m) bronze figures, dubbed Winged Figures of the Republic, were both formed in a continuous pour. To put such large bronzes into place without marring the highly polished bronze surface, they were placed on ice and guided into position as the ice melted. Hansen's bas-relief on the Nevada elevator tower depicts the benefits of the dam: flood control, navigation, irrigation, water storage, and power. The bas-relief on the Arizona elevator depicts, in his words, "the visages of those Indian tribes who have inhabited mountains and plains from ages distant."

== Operation ==
=== Power plant and water demands ===
In the 21st century, the water level of Lake Mead has declined from near maximum capacity to within 100 feet (30 m) of the minimum level needed for Hoover Dam to generate electricity.

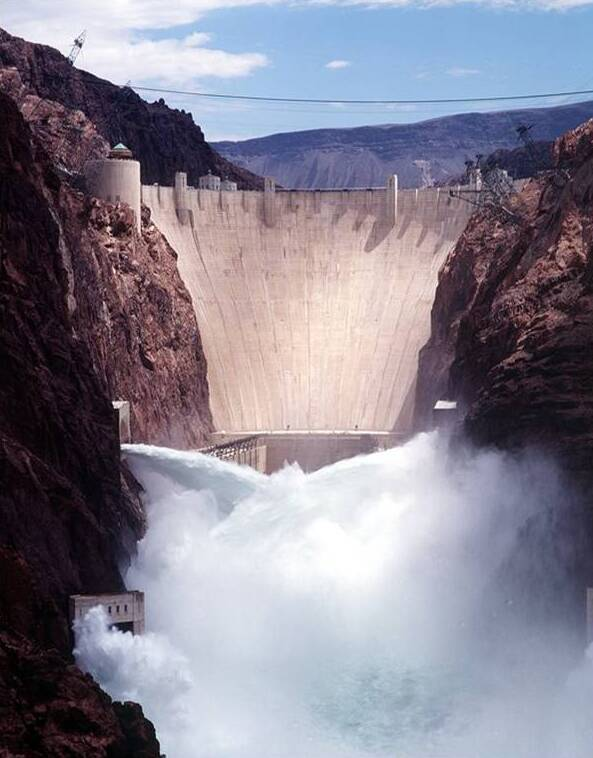
Water is released from the jet-flow gates for testing in 1998.

Excavation for the powerhouse was carried out simultaneously with the excavation for the dam foundation and abutments. The excavation of this U-shaped structure located at the downstream toe of the dam was completed in late 1933 with the first concrete placed in November 1933. Filling of Lake Mead began February 1, 1935, even before the last of the concrete was poured that May. The powerhouse was one of the projects uncompleted at the time of the formal dedication on September 30, 1935; a crew of 500 men remained to finish it and other structures. To make the powerhouse roof bombproof, it was constructed of layers of concrete, rock, and steel with a total thickness of about 3.5 feet (1.1 m), topped with layers of sand and tar.

In the latter half of 1936, water levels in Lake Mead were high enough to permit power generation, and the first three Allis-Chalmers built Francis turbine-generators, all on the Nevada side, began operating. In March 1937, one more Nevada generator went online and the first Arizona generator by August. By September 1939, four more generators were operating, and the dam's power plant became the largest hydroelectricity facility in the world. The final generator was not placed in service until 1961, bringing the maximum generating capacity to 1,345 megawatts at the time. Original plans called for 16 large generators, eight on each side of the river, but two smaller generators were installed instead of one large one on the Arizona side for a total of 17. The smaller generators were used to serve smaller communities at a time when the output of each generator was dedicated to a single municipality, before the dam's total power output was placed on the grid and made arbitrarily distributable.

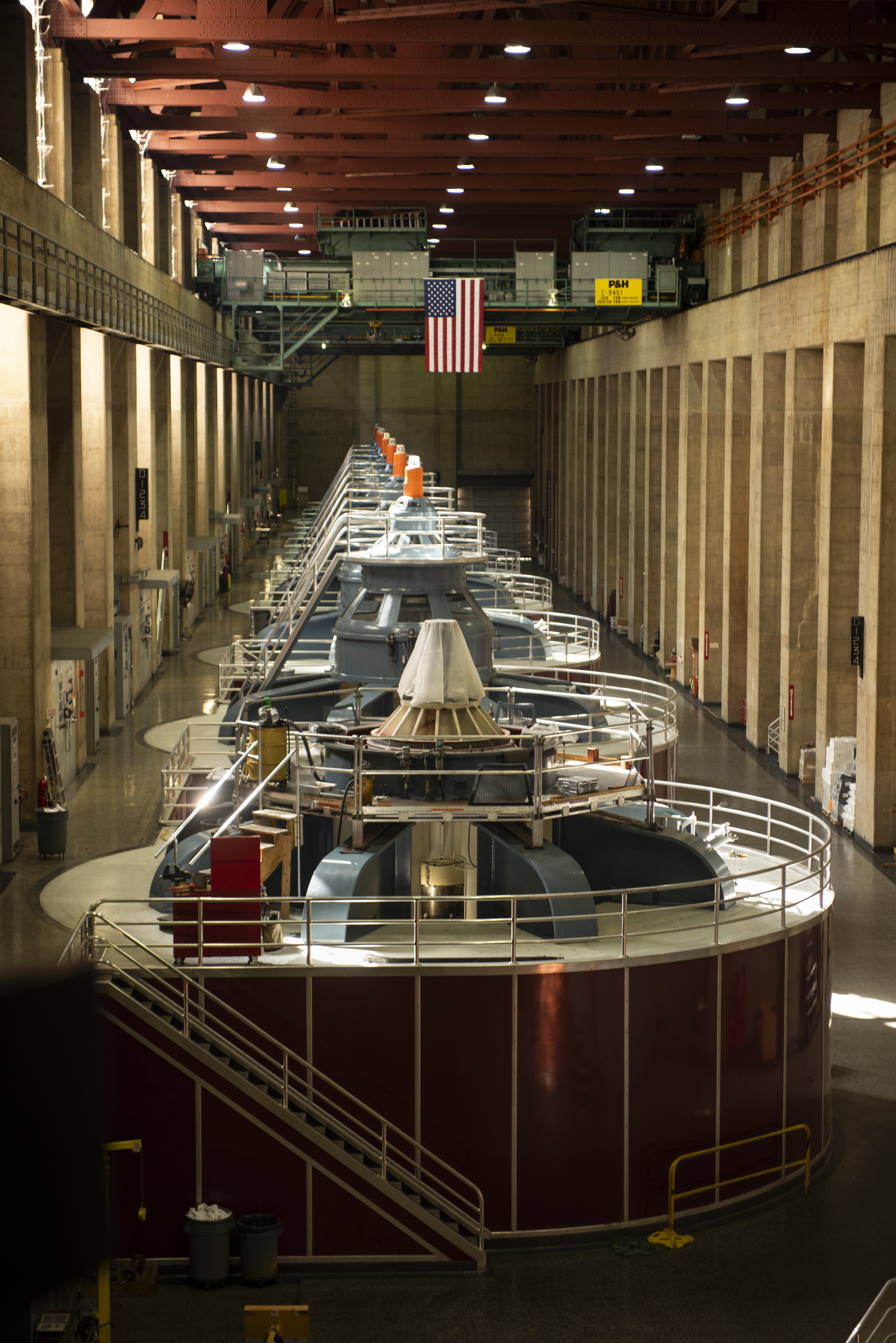
Turbine/generator deck in power plant beneath Hoover Dam.

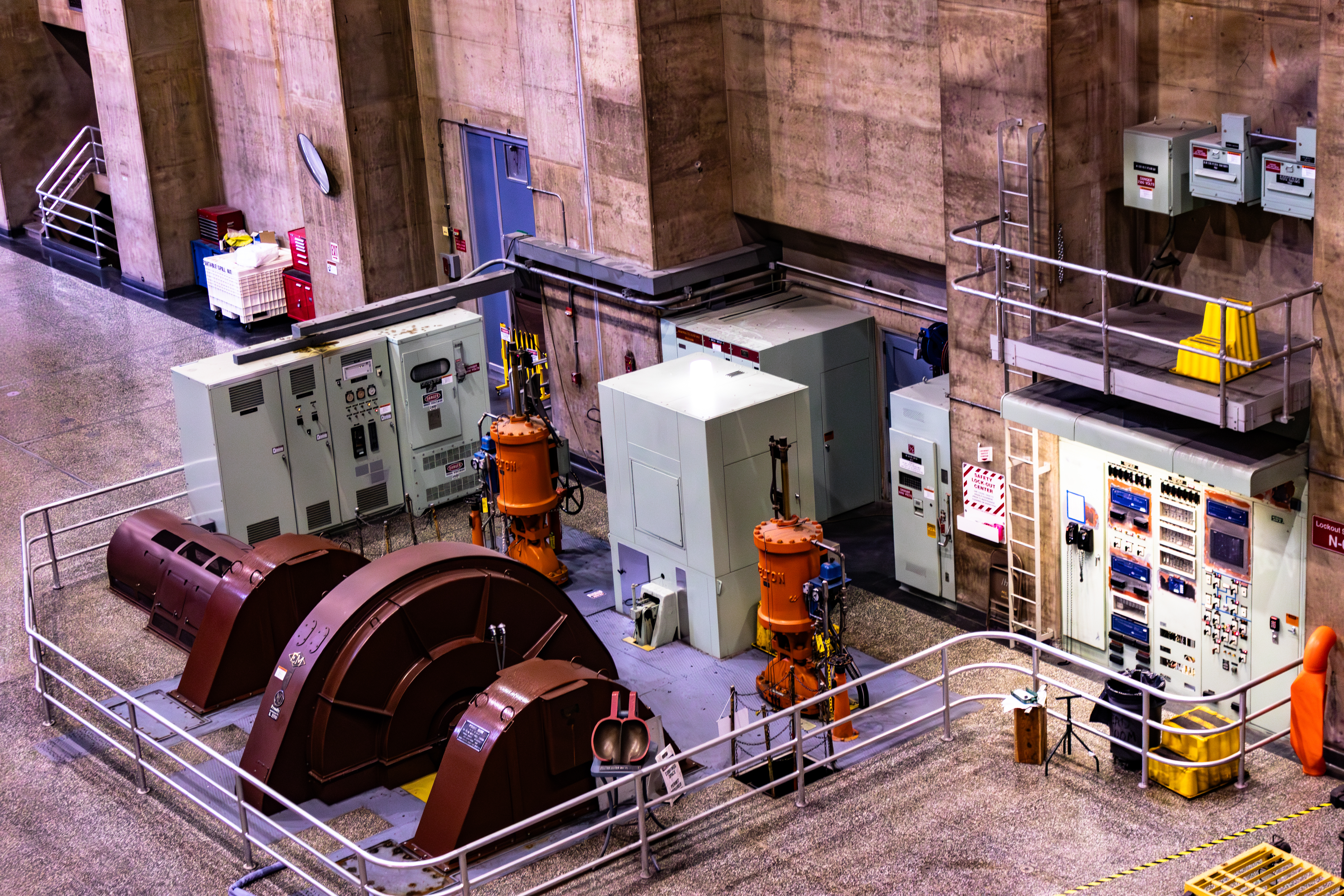
Turbine/generator controls in power plant beneath Hoover Dam.

Before water from Lake Mead reaches the turbines, it enters the intake towers and then four gradually narrowing penstocks which funnel the water down towards the powerhouse. The intakes provide a maximum hydraulic head (water pressure) of 590 ft (180 m) as the water reaches a speed of about 85 mph (140 km/h). The entire flow of the Colorado River usually passes through the turbines. The spillways and outlet works (jet-flow gates) are rarely used. The jet-flow gates, located in concrete structures 180 feet (55 m) above the river and also at the outlets of the inner diversion tunnels at river level, may be used to divert water around the dam in emergency or flood conditions, but have never done so, and in practice are used only to drain water from the penstocks for maintenance. Following an uprating project from 1986 to 1993, the total gross power rating for the plant, including two 2.4-megawatt Pelton turbine generators that power Hoover Dam's own operations, is a maximum capacity of 2080 megawatts. The annual generation of Hoover Dam varies. The maximum net generation was 10.348 TWh in 1984, and the minimum since 1940 was 2.648 TWh in 1956. The average power generated was 4.2 TWh/year for 1947–2008. In 2015, the dam generated 3.6 TWh.

The amount of electricity generated by Hoover Dam has been decreasing along with the falling water level in Lake Mead due to the prolonged drought since year 2000 and high demand for the Colorado River's water. By 2014 its generating capacity was downrated by 23% to 1592 MW and was providing power only during periods of peak demand. Lake Mead fell to a new record low elevation of 1,071.61 feet (326.63 m) on July 1, 2016, before beginning to rebound slowly. Under its original design, the dam would no longer be able to generate power once the water level fell below 1,050 feet (320 m), which might have occurred in 2017 had water restrictions not been enforced. To lower the minimum power pool elevation from 1,050 to 950 feet (320 to 290 m), five wide-head turbines, designed to work efficiently with less flow, were installed. Water levels were maintained at over 1,075 feet (328 m) in 2018 and 2019, but fell to a new record low of 1,071.55 feet (326.61 m) on June 10, 2021 and were projected to fall below 1,066 feet (325 m) by the end of 2021.

Control of water was the primary concern in the building of the dam. Power generation has allowed the dam project to be self-sustaining: proceeds from the sale of power repaid the 50-year construction loan, and those revenues also finance the multimillion-dollar yearly maintenance budget. Power is generated in step with and only with the release of water in response to downstream water demands.

Lake Mead and downstream releases from the dam also provide water for both municipal and irrigation uses. Water released from the Hoover Dam eventually reaches several canals. The Colorado River Aqueduct and Central Arizona Project branch off Lake Havasu while the All-American Canal is supplied by the Imperial Dam. In total, water from Lake Mead serves 18 million people in Arizona, Nevada, and California and supplies the irrigation of over 1,000,000 acres (400,000 ha) of land.

In 2018, the Los Angeles Department of Water and Power (LADWP) proposed a $3 billion pumped-storage hydroelectricity project—a "battery" of sorts—that would use wind and solar power to recirculate water back up to Lake Mead from a pumping station 20 miles (32 km) downriver.

==== Power distribution ====
Electricity from the dam's powerhouse was originally sold pursuant to a fifty-year contract, authorized by Congress in 1934, which ran from 1937 to 1987. In 1984, Congress passed a new statute which set power allocations to southern California, Arizona, and Nevada from the dam from 1987 to 2017. The powerhouse was run under the original authorization by the Los Angeles Department of Water and Power and Southern California Edison; in 1987, the Bureau of Reclamation assumed control. In 2011, Congress enacted legislation extending the current contracts until 2067, after setting aside 5% of Hoover Dam's power for sale to Native American tribes, electric cooperatives, and other entities. The new arrangement began on October 1, 2017.

The Bureau of Reclamation reports that the energy generated under the contracts ending in 2017 was allocated as follows:

Area	Percentage
Metropolitan Water District of Southern California	28.53%
State of Nevada	23.37%
State of Arizona	18.95%
Los Angeles, California	15.42%
Southern California Edison	5.54%
Boulder City, Nevada	1.77%
Glendale, California	1.59%
Pasadena, California	1.36%
Anaheim, California	1.15%
Riverside, California	0.86%
Vernon, California	0.62%
Burbank, California	0.59%
Azusa, California	0.11%
Colton, California	0.09%
Banning, California	0.05%

=== Spillways ===
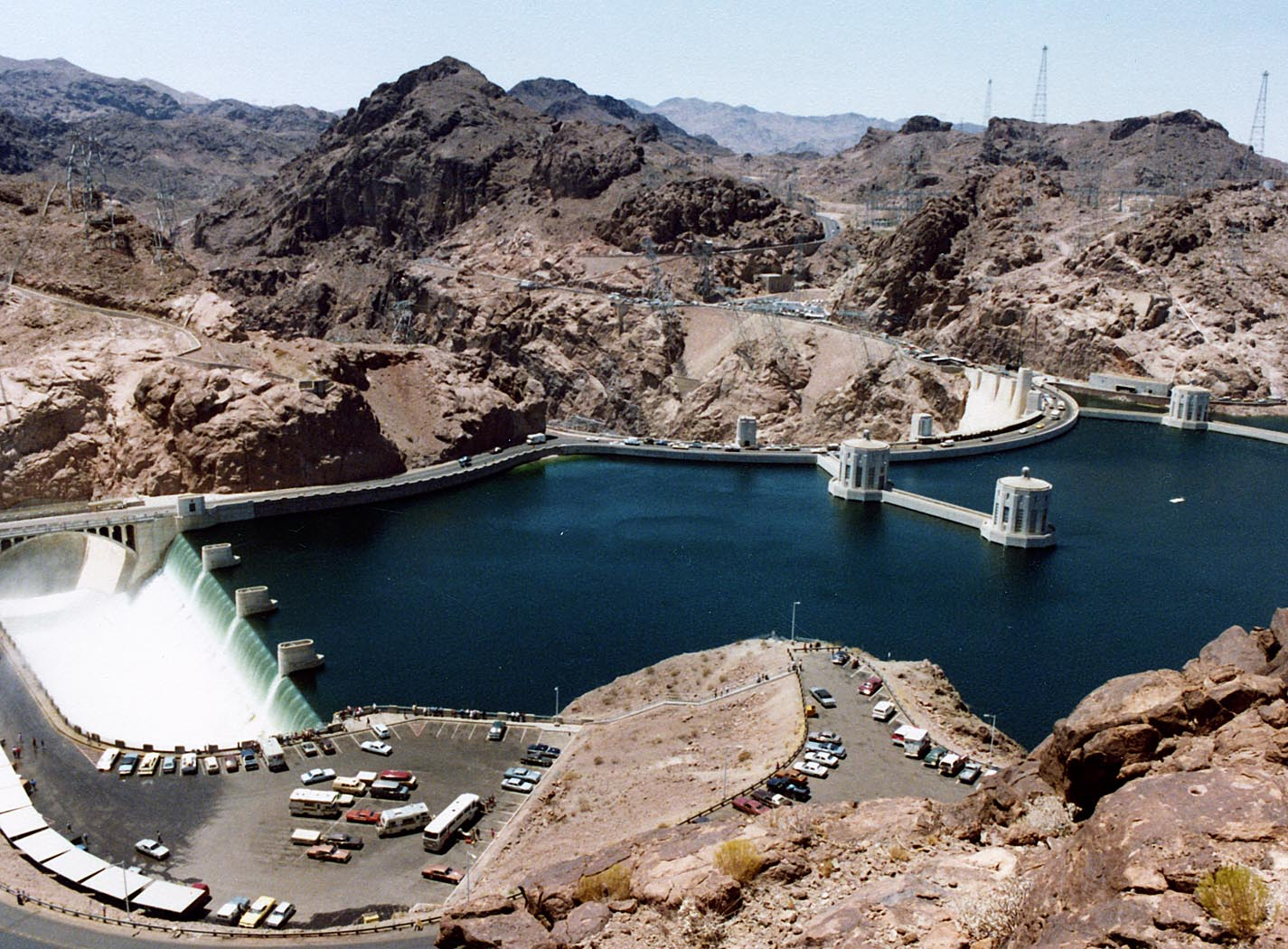
Water enters the Arizona spillway (left) during the 1983 floods. Lake Mead water level was 1,225.6 ft (373.6 m)

The dam is protected against over-topping by two spillways. The spillway entrances are located behind each dam abutment, running roughly parallel to the canyon walls. The spillway entrance arrangement forms a classic side-flow weir with each spillway containing four 100-foot-long (30 m) and 16-foot-wide (4.9 m) steel-drum gates. Each gate weighs 5,000,000 pounds (2,300 metric tons) and can be operated manually or automatically. Gates are raised and lowered depending on water levels in the reservoir and flood conditions. The gates cannot entirely prevent water from entering the spillways but can maintain an extra 16 ft (4.9 m) of lake level.

Water flowing over the spillways falls dramatically into 600-foot-long (180 m), 50-foot-wide (15 m) spillway tunnels before connecting to the outer diversion tunnels and reentering the main river channel below the dam. This complex spillway entrance arrangement combined with the approximate 700-foot (210 m) elevation drop from the top of the reservoir to the river below was a difficult engineering problem and posed numerous design challenges. Each spillway's capacity of 200,000 cu ft/s (5,700 m^{3}/s) was empirically verified in post-construction tests in 1941.

The large spillway tunnels have only been used twice, for testing in 1941 and because of flooding in 1983. Both times, when inspecting the tunnels after the spillways were used, engineers found major damage to the concrete linings and underlying rock. The 1941 damage was attributed to a slight misalignment of the tunnel invert (or base), which caused cavitation, a phenomenon in fast-flowing liquids in which vapor bubbles collapse with explosive force. In response to this finding, the tunnels were patched with special heavy-duty concrete and the surface of the concrete was polished mirror-smooth. The spillways were modified in 1947 by adding flip buckets, which both slow the water and decrease the spillway's effective capacity, in an attempt to eliminate conditions thought to have contributed to the 1941 damage. The 1983 damage, also due to cavitation, led to the installation of aerators in the spillways. Tests at Grand Coulee Dam showed that the technique worked, in principle.

=== Roadway and tourism ===
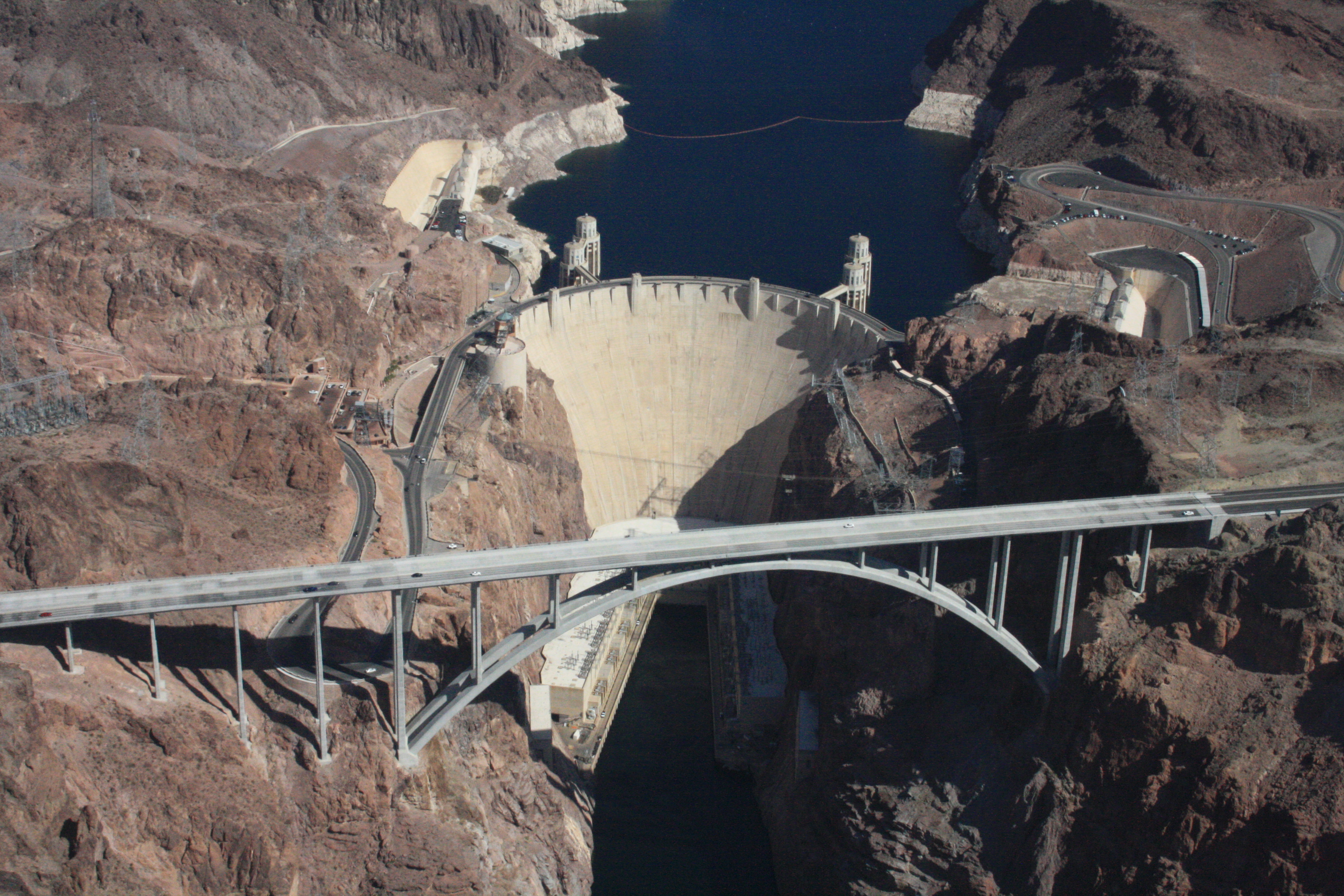
The bypass in front of the dam

There are two lanes for automobile traffic across the top of the dam, which formerly served as the Colorado River crossing for U.S. Route 93. In the wake of the September 11 terrorist attacks, authorities expressed security concerns and the Hoover Dam Bypass project was expedited. Pending the completion of the bypass, restricted traffic was permitted over Hoover Dam. Some types of vehicles were inspected prior to crossing the dam while semi-trailer trucks, buses carrying luggage, and enclosed-box trucks over 40 ft (12 m) long were not allowed on the dam at all, and were diverted to U.S. Route 95 or Nevada State Routes 163/68. The four-lane Hoover Dam Bypass opened on October 19, 2010. It includes a composite steel and concrete arch bridge, the Mike O'Callaghan–Pat Tillman Memorial Bridge, 1,500 ft (460 m) downstream from the dam. With the opening of the bypass, through traffic is no longer allowed across Hoover Dam; dam visitors are allowed to use the existing roadway to approach from the Nevada side and cross to parking lots and other facilities on the Arizona side.

Hoover Dam opened for tours in 1937 after its completion but following Japan's attack on Pearl Harbor on December 7, 1941, it was closed to the public when the United States entered World War II, during which only authorized traffic, in convoys, was permitted. After the war, it reopened September 2, 1945, and by 1953, annual attendance had risen to 448,081. The dam closed on November 25, 1963, and March 31, 1969, days of mourning in remembrance of Presidents Kennedy and Eisenhower. In 1995, a new visitors' center was built, and the following year, visits exceeded one million for the first time. The dam closed again to the public on September 11, 2001; modified tours were resumed in December and a new "Discovery Tour" was added the following year. Today, nearly a million people per year take the tours of the dam offered by the Bureau of Reclamation. The government's increased security concerns have led to the exclusion of visitors from most of the interior structures. As a result, few of True's decorations can now be seen by visitors. Visitors can only purchase tickets on-site and have the options of a guided tour of the whole facility or only the power plant area. The only self-guided tour option is for the visitor center itself, where visitors can view various exhibits and enjoy a 360-degree view of the dam.

== Environmental impact ==
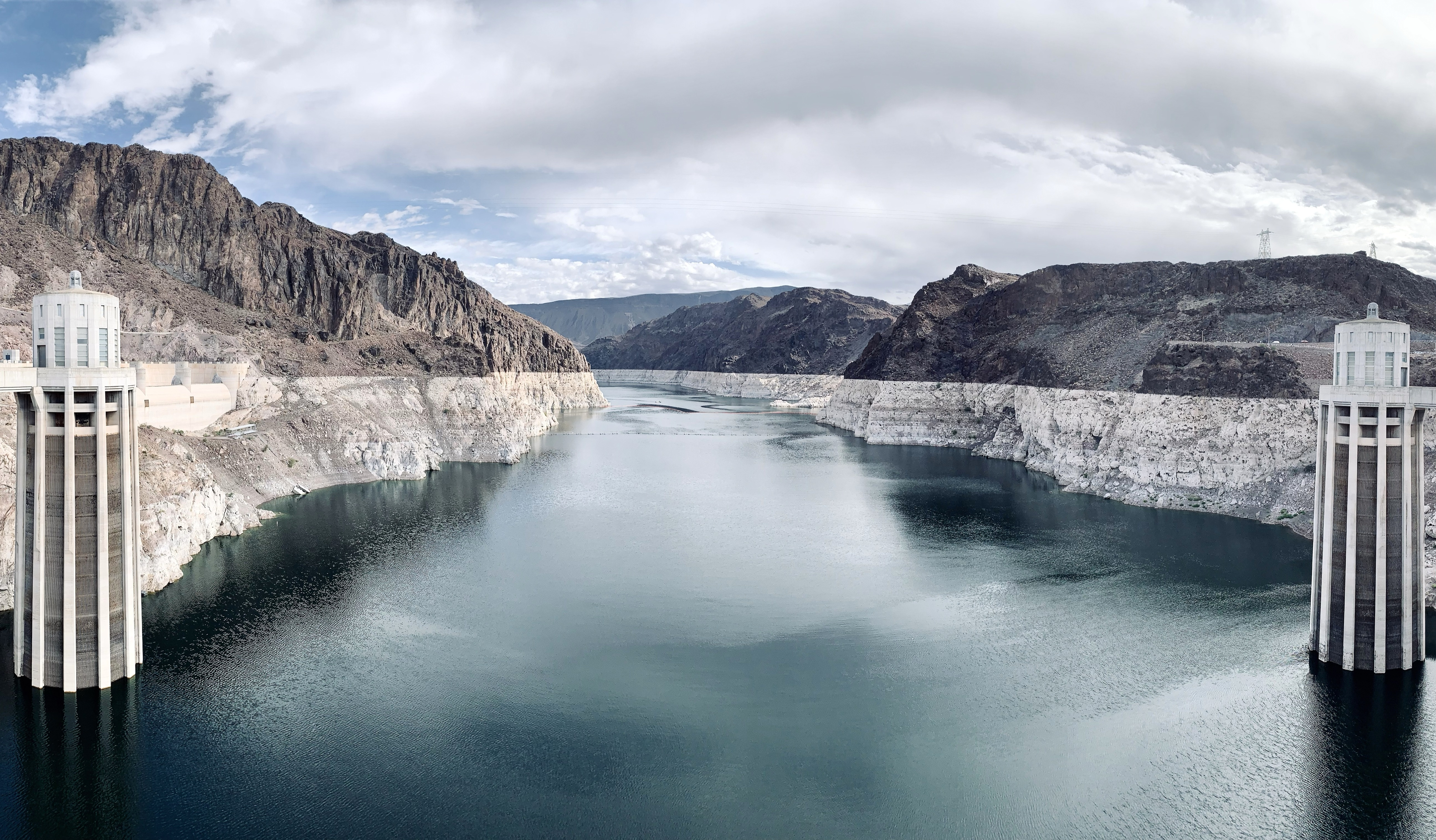
View upstream from Hoover Dam, October 2021, during the Southwestern North American megadrought

The changes in water flow and use caused by Hoover Dam's construction and operation have had a large impact on the Colorado River Delta. The construction of the dam has been implicated in causing the decline of this estuarine ecosystem. For six years after the construction of the dam, while Lake Mead filled, virtually no water reached the mouth of the river. The delta's estuary, which once had a freshwater-saltwater mixing zone stretching 40 miles (64 km) south of the river's mouth, was turned into an inverse estuary where the level of salinity was higher close to the river's mouth.

The Colorado River had experienced natural flooding before the construction of the Hoover Dam. The dam eliminated the natural flooding, threatening many species adapted to the flooding, including both plants and animals. The construction of the dam devastated the populations of native fish in the river downstream from the dam. Four species of fish native to the Colorado River, the Bonytail chub, Colorado pikeminnow, Humpback chub, and Razorback sucker, are listed as endangered.

== Naming controversy ==
1933 Los Angeles Times political cartoon commenting on the attempts of Ickes to keep "Hoover" off the dam.

During the years of lobbying leading up to the passage of legislation authorizing the dam in 1928, the press generally referred to the dam as "Boulder Dam" or as "Boulder Canyon Dam", even though the proposed site had shifted to Black Canyon. The Boulder Canyon Project Act of 1928 (BCPA) never mentioned a proposed name or title for the dam. The BCPA merely allows the government to "construct, operate, and maintain a dam and incidental works in the main stream of the Colorado River at Black Canyon or Boulder Canyon".

When Secretary of the Interior Ray Wilbur spoke at the ceremony starting the building of the railway between Las Vegas and the dam site on September 17, 1930, he named the dam "Hoover Dam", citing a tradition of naming dams after Presidents, though none had been so honored during their terms of office. Wilbur justified his choice on the ground that Hoover was "the great engineer whose vision and persistence ... has done so much to make [the dam] possible". One writer complained in response that "the Great Engineer had quickly drained, ditched, and dammed the country."

After Hoover's election defeat in 1932 and the accession of the Roosevelt administration, Secretary Ickes ordered on May 13, 1933, that the dam be referred to as Boulder Dam. Ickes stated that Wilbur had been imprudent in naming the dam after a sitting president, that Congress had never ratified his choice, and that it had long been referred to as Boulder Dam. Unknown to the general public, Attorney General Homer Cummings informed Ickes that Congress had indeed used the name "Hoover Dam" in five different bills appropriating money for construction of the dam. The official status this conferred to the name "Hoover Dam" had been noted on the floor of the House of Representatives by Congressman Edward T. Taylor of Colorado on December 12, 1930, but was likewise ignored by Ickes.

When Ickes spoke at the dedication ceremony on September 30, 1935, he was determined, as he recorded in his diary, "to try to nail down for good and all the name Boulder Dam." At one point in the speech, he spoke the words "Boulder Dam" five times within thirty seconds. Further, he suggested that if the dam were to be named after any one person, it should be for California Senator Hiram Johnson, a lead sponsor of the authorizing legislation. Roosevelt also referred to the dam as Boulder Dam, and the Republican-leaning Los Angeles Times, which at the time of Ickes' name change had run an editorial cartoon showing Ickes ineffectively chipping away at an enormous sign "HOOVER DAM", reran it showing Roosevelt reinforcing Ickes, but having no greater success.

In the following years, the name "Boulder Dam" failed to fully take hold, with many Americans using both names interchangeably and mapmakers divided as to which name should be printed. Memories of the Great Depression faded, and Hoover to some extent rehabilitated himself through good works during and after World War II. In 1947, a bill passed both Houses of Congress unanimously restoring the name "Hoover Dam." Ickes, who was by then a private citizen, opposed the change, stating, "I didn't know Hoover was that small a man to take credit for something he had nothing to do with."

== Recognition ==
Hoover Dam was recognized as a National Historic Civil Engineering Landmark in 1984. It was listed on the National Register of Historic Places in 1981 and was designated a National Historic Landmark in 1985, cited for its engineering innovations.

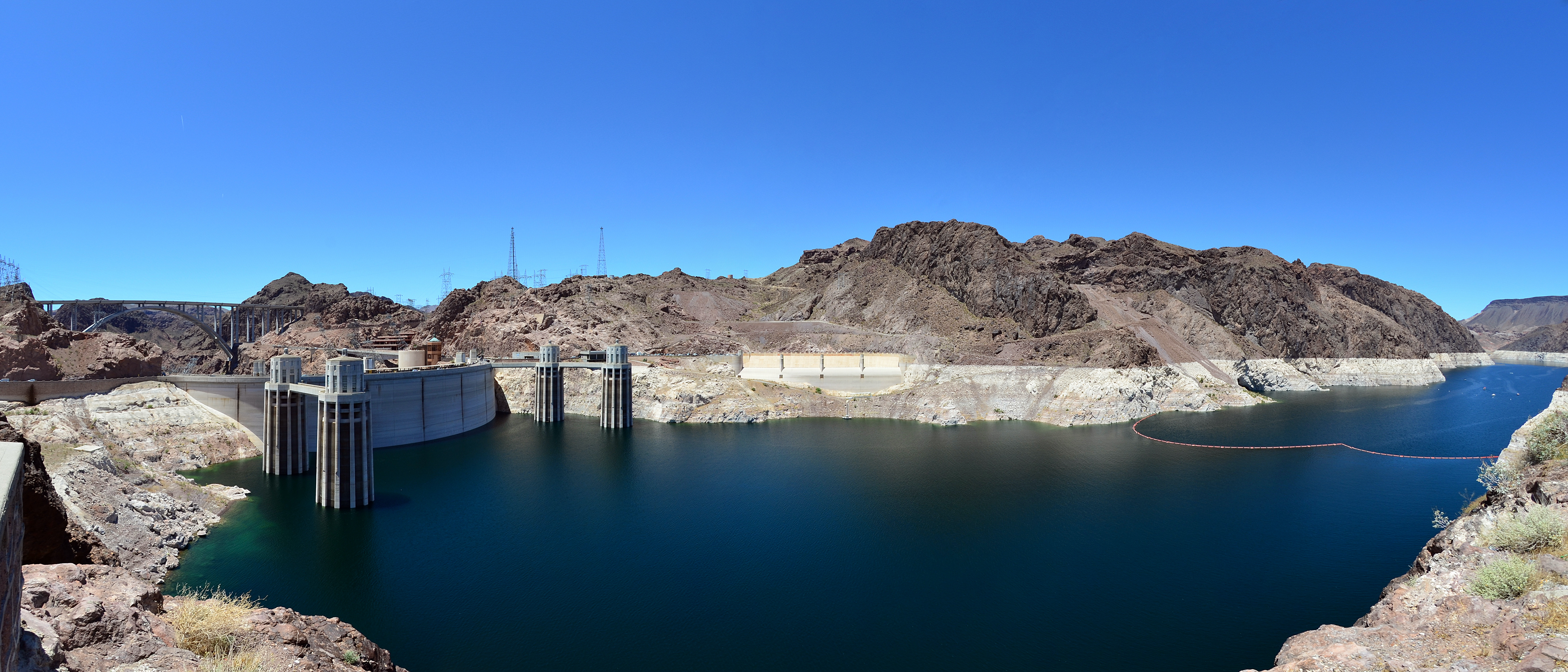
Hoover Dam panoramic view from the Arizona side showing the penstock towers, the Nevada-side spillway entrance and the Mike O'Callaghan – Pat Tillman Memorial Bridge, also known as the Hoover Dam Bypass

== See also ==
- Ralph Luther Criswell, lobbyist on behalf of the dam
- Glen Canyon Dam
- Hoover Dam Police
- List of dams in the Colorado River system
- List of largest hydroelectric power stations
- List of largest hydroelectric power stations in the United States
- List of National Historic Landmarks in Arizona
- List of National Historic Landmarks in Nevada
- St. Thomas, Nevada, ghost town with site now under Lake Mead.
- Water in California
- Hoover Dam in popular culture

== Bibliography ==
=== Cited works ===
- Bureau of Reclamation (2006). Reclamation: Managing Water in the West: Hoover Dam. US Department of the Interior.
- Cummings, Homer (1939). Selected Papers of Homer Cummings. New York: Scribners.
- Dunar, Andrew J.; McBride, Dennis (2001) [1993]. Building Hoover Dam: An Oral History of the Great Depression. Reno, Nev.: University of Nevada Press. ISBN 978-0-87417-489-2.
- Hiltzik, Michael A. (2010). Colossus: Hoover Dam and the Making of the American Century. New York: Free Press. ISBN 978-1-4165-3216-3.
- The Story of the Hoover Dam. Las Vegas: Nevada Publications, Inc. 2006. ISBN 978-0-913814-79-6.
- Rogers, Jerry; Wiltshire, Richard; Gilbert, David (2011). "Celebrating the 75th Anniversary of Hoover Dam: Highlights of the October 20–22, 2010, ASCE Hoover Dam 75th Anniversary History Symposium/Tours/Proceedings". In R. Edward Beighley II; Mark W. Killgore (eds.). World Environmental and Water Resources Congress 2011: Bearing Knowledge for Sustainability. doi:10.1061/41173(414)200. ISBN 978-0-7844-1173-5.
- Stevens, Joseph E. (1988). Hoover Dam: An American Adventure. Norman, OK: University of Oklahoma Press. ISBN 978-0-8061-2283-0.
- True, Jere; Kirby, Victoria Tupper (2009). Allen Tupper True: An American Artist. San Francisco: Canyon Leap. ISBN 978-0-9817238-1-5.

=== Other sources ===
- Arrigo, Anthony F. (2014). Imaging Hoover Dam: The Making of a Cultural Icon. Reno, NV: University of Nevada Press.
- Bartojay, Katie; Joy, Westin (October 21–22, 2010). Wiltshire, Richard L.; Gilbert, David R.; Rogers, Jerry R. (eds.). Long-Term Properties of Hoover Dam Mass Concrete. Hoover Dam 75th Anniversary History Symposium. Las Vegas, Nevada: American Society of Civil Engineers. pp. 74–84. ISBN 978-0-7844-1141-4.
- Cohn, Jeffrey P. (December 2001). "Resurrecting the Dammed: A Look at Colorado River Restoration". BioScience. 51 (12): 998–1003. doi:10.1641/0006-3568(2001)051[0998:RTDALA]2.0.CO;2.
- Fiedler, William R. (October 21–22, 2010). Wiltshire, Richard L.; Gilbert, David R.; Rogers, Jerry R. (eds.). Performance of Spillway Structures Using Hoover Dam Spillways as a Benchmark. Hoover Dam 75th Anniversary History Symposium. Las Vegas, Nevada: American Society of Civil Engineers. pp. 267–287. ISBN 978-0-7844-1141-4.
- Glenn, Edward P.; Lee, Christopher; Felger, Richard; Zengel, Scott (August 1996). "Effects of Water Management on the Wetlands of the Colorado River Delta, Mexico". Conservation Biology. 10 (4): 1175–1186. Bibcode:1996ConBi..10.1175G. doi:10.1046/j.1523-1739.1996.10041175.x. JSTOR 2387153.
- Minckley, W. L.; Marsh, Paul C.; Deacon, James E.; Dowling, Thomas E.; Hedrick, Philip W.; Matthews, William J.; Mueller, Gordon (2003). "A Conservation Plan for Native Fishes of the Lower Colorado River". BioScience. 53 (3): 219–234. doi:10.1641/0006-3568(2003)053[0219:ACPFNF]2.0.CO;2. ISSN 0006-3568.
- Rodriguez, C. A.; Flessa, K. W.; Téllez-Duarte, M. S.; Dettman, D. L.; Ávila-Serrano, G. A. (2001). "Macrofaunal and isotopic estimates of the former extent of the Colorado River estuary, upper Gulf of California, México" (PDF). Journal of Arid Environments. 49 (1): 183–193. Bibcode:2001JArEn..49..183R. doi:10.1006/jare.2001.0845.
- Rogers, J. David (October 21–22, 2010). Wiltshire, Richard L.; Gilbert, David R.; Rogers, Jerry R. (eds.). Hoover Dam: Evolution of the Dam's Design. Hoover Dam 75th Anniversary History Symposium. Las Vegas, Nevada: American Society of Civil Engineers. pp. 85–123. ISBN 978-0-7844-1141-4.
- Schmidt, John C.; Webb, Robert H.; Valdez, Richard A.; Marzolf, G. Richard; Stevens, Lawrence E. (September 1998). "Science and Values in River Restoration in the Grand Canyon". BioScience. 48 (9): 735–747. doi:10.2307/1313336. JSTOR 1313336.
