= Sugar (American band) =

American alternative rock band

SUGAR
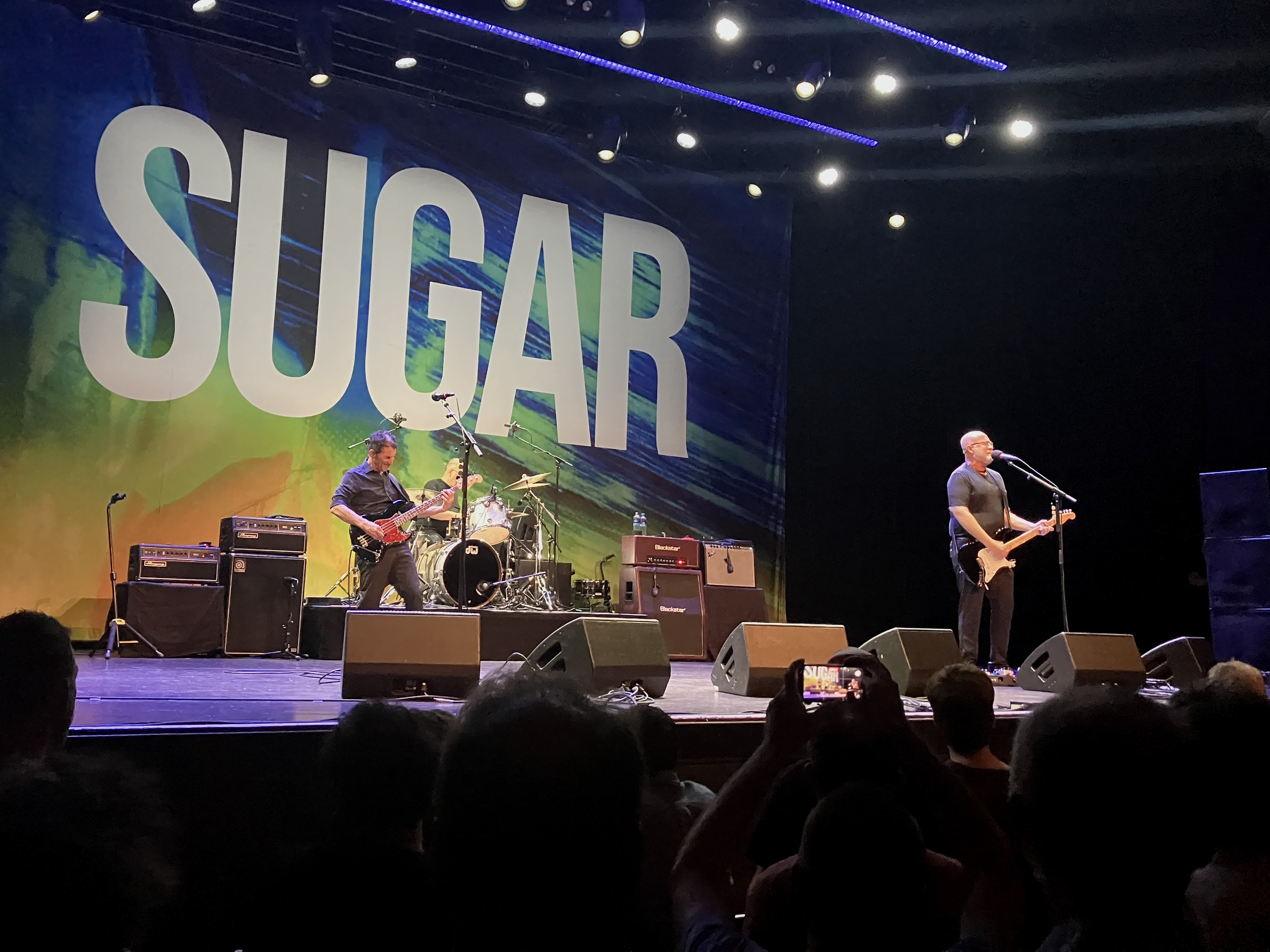
- SUGAR performing at TivoliVredenburg in Utrecht on June 15, 2026

Background information
- Origin: Brooklyn NY, Boston MA, Athens GA, US
- Genres: Alternative rock; jangle pop; grunge; power pop
- Years active: 1992–1995, 2025–present
- Labels: Rykodisc; Creation (UK)
- Members: Bob Mould; David Barbe; Malcolm Travis
- Website: sugarcopperblue.com

Sugar are an American alternative rock band. Originally active between 1992 and early 1995, they are led by the singer and guitarist Bob Mould (ex-Hüsker Dü), alongside bassist David Barbe (ex-Mercyland) and drummer Malcolm Travis (ex-Human Sexual Response). Following thirty years of inactivity, the band reformed in October 2025.

== Career ==
After frontman Bob Mould departed from Hüsker Dü, he released two solo albums, Workbook, which was critically acclaimed, and Black Sheets of Rain. Mould parted ways with Virgin Records in 1991, and toured the world as a solo performer while writing and performing dozens of new songs. Mould soon enlisted David Barbe and Malcolm Travis as the rhythm section for future recording sessions.

In early 1992, Mould, Barbe and Travis rehearsed thirty songs in the back of a tire shop in downtown Athens, Georgia. The band was named in a Waffle House restaurant in Athens, when Mould spotted a sugar packet on the table where he and the other two band members were sitting. Their first concert was on February 20, 1992, at the 40 Watt Club in Athens, Georgia.

Later in 1992, the band released the album Copper Blue on Rykodisc in the US and Creation Records in the UK. Copper Blue was named Album Of The Year 1992 by NME. The music videos for the singles "If I Can't Change Your Mind" and "Helpless" received extensive air time on MTV shortly after the album's release. The single for "If I Can't Change Your Mind" had moderate success in the UK Singles Chart.

In the spring of 1993, they released Beaster, an EP of material recorded during the Copper Blue sessions. The album proved to be more aggressive than the content on Copper Blue. After an abortive attempt to record a second album, the band regrouped and released File Under: Easy Listening in September 1994. It reached No. 7 in the UK Albums Chart.

The band played their final show in Sendai, Japan in January 1995. Barbe wished to spend more time with his growing family. Travis took over the drumming slot in Kustomized. Mould continued performing as a solo artist. A b-side compilation album, Besides, was released in July 1995.

Mould spent the summer of 2012 touring and playing Copper Blue in its entirety.

In October 2025, several social media accounts were created under the name "Sugar Copper Blue," featuring short archival clips of Sugar shows. All three members of Sugar notably followed the Instagram account, fueling reports of a rumored reunion. On October 15, 2025, the band's newly-created website announced live shows in New York and London in May 2026, together with a new song called "House of Dead Memories." A tour of the UK, Europe and the US running through to October 2026 was announced shortly afterwards.

== Members ==
- Bob Mould – vocals, guitars, keyboards, percussion (1992–1995, 2025–present)
- David Barbe – vocals, bass, guitars (1992–1995, 2025–present)
- Malcolm Travis – drums, percussion (1992–1995, 2025–present)

== Discography ==
Sugar discography
- Studio albums: 2
- EPs: 1
- Live albums: 1
- Compilation albums: 3
- Singles: 8

The discography of Sugar consists of two studio albums, one EP, one compilation album, one live album, two boxsets and eight singles.

=== Albums ===
List of albums, with selected details and chart positions
Title	Details	Chart positions			
Title	Details	US	AUS	NZ	UK
Copper Blue	Released: September 1992; Labels: Rykodisc, Creation	–	92	12	10
File Under: Easy Listening	Released: September 1994; Labels: Rykodisc, Creation	50	72	10	7

=== EPs ===
List of EPs, with selected details and chart positions
Title	Details	Chart positions			
Title	Details	US	AUS	NZ	UK
Beaster	Released: April 1993; Labels: Rykodisc, Creation	130	94	18	3

=== Compilations ===
List of compilation albums, with selected details and chart positions
Title	Details	Chart positions			
Title	Details	US	AUS	NZ	UK
Besides	Released: June 1995; Labels: Rykodisc, Creation	122	–	–	–

=== Live albums ===
- The Joke Is Always on Us, Sometimes. (Edsel, 2013)

=== Box sets ===
- A Box of Sugar (Edsel, 2013) – 5xLP
- Complete Recordings 1992-1995 (Edsel, 2014) – 5xCD

=== Singles ===
- All singles were released on both Creation and Rykodisc; except where indicated.

List of singles, with selected chart positions
Title	Year	Chart positions			Album
Title	Year	US Alt	NZ	UK	Album
"Changes" (Creation)	1992	–	–	77	Copper Blue
"Helpless" (Rykodisc)	1992	5	37	–	Copper Blue
"A Good Idea"	1992	–	–	65	Copper Blue
"If I Can't Change Your Mind"	1993	–	–	30	Copper Blue
"Tilted" (Creation)	1993	–	–	48	Beaster
"Your Favorite Thing"	1994	14	–	40	File Under: Easy Listening
"Believe What You're Saying"	1994	–	–	73	File Under: Easy Listening
"Gee Angel" (Rykodisc)	1995	–	–	–	File Under: Easy Listening
"House of Dead Memories" (Granary/BMG)	2025	–	–	–	House of Dead Memories
