= Copper Blue =

Studio album by Sugar
- Released: September 4, 1992
- Recorded: 1990–1992
- Studios: The Outpost, Stoughton, Massachusetts
- Genres: Alternative rock; power pop
- Length: 44:58
- Label: Rykodisc/Creation
- Producers: Bob Mould, Lou Giordano

Sugar chronology
Copper Blue (1992)	Beaster (1993)

Singles from Copper Blue
- 1. "Changes" Released: August 1992 (UK); 2. "A Good Idea" Released: 1992; 3. "Helpless" Released: 1992; 4. "If I Can't Change Your Mind" Released: 1993

Copper Blue is the debut studio album by American alternative rock band Sugar. It was voted 1992 Album of the Year by the NME. All of the songs were written by guitarist/vocalist Bob Mould, who also co-produced with Lou Giordano. Musically, the band continues the thick punk guitar of Mould's previous band, Hüsker Dü, while slowing the tempo and emphasizing melody even more.

== Background ==
During the 1980s, Bob Mould was the guitarist and a lead vocalist of the rock band Hüsker Dü. Initially rooted in hardcore punk, Hüsker Dü eventually developed a sound based around alternative rock, with an emphasis on melody. When Hüsker Dü disbanded in 1987, Mould continued as a solo artist, and released two albums in 1989 and 1990. His debut solo album in particular, Workbook, eschewed the hardcore sound that had previously defined his career, and instead featured a lighter sound with folk influence.

In 1991, Nirvana released its seminal album Nevermind, which was in part responsible for bringing alternative rock and grunge to mainstream popularity. The popularity of Nevermind and its grunge sound had a profound impact on Mould. In an interview with NPR, Mould said: "When Nevermind came out, that album changed the way people listen to music. A lot of the songs that I had been writing in 1991 led up to my next group, Sugar — and had it not been for Nevermind, I don't know if Sugar's Copper Blue would have stood a chance in '92. But people were now receptive to this sound." Around this time, Mould lost the publishing rights to his solo albums, and was dropped from Virgin Records. This necessitated a nine-month solo tour throughout Europe. During this tour, Mould wrote and performed new songs to see how people reacted.

Mould described the music he wrote on tour as "more melodic and immediate than on the other solo records". He had written over thirty songs for a third solo album, and recorded a home demo tape. After some recommendations from one of his friends, Mould signed with Rykodisc and Creation Records, who would release his next album in the United States and Europe respectively. Mould then began looking for studio musicians, and recruited bassist David Barbe and drummer Malcolm Travis in late 1991. He also hired Lou Giordano to produce the album at the Outpost in Stoughton, Massachusetts. The band's name came from a sugar packet Mould noticed while eating at a diner with the other two members.

== Release and reissues ==
A limited edition initial run of the CD was released by Rykodisc in a front-and-back metal copper sleeve with each of the 2,500 copies containing a one-of-a-kind Polaroid photo taken by one of the three band members and stamped on the back with "Sugar Copper Blue Summer '92."

Several tracks were recorded for this album, but were not included. Mould decided to release them separately as an EP entitled Beaster.

Rykodisc released a remastered version pressed on 180-gram vinyl on June 21, 2011. It is accompanied by a drop card for a free download of the digital version.

On July 24, 2012, the album was reissued by Merge Records as a three-disc set containing the full album accompanied by B-sides (disc 1), the Beaster EP (disc 2), and a 1992 live performance at Chicago's Cabaret Metro (disc 3).

== Critical reception ==
Professional ratings
Review scores
Source	Rating
AllMusic	4.5/5 stars
Chicago Tribune	3.5/4 stars
Entertainment Weekly	B+
Los Angeles Times	3.5/4 stars
Mojo	5/5 stars
NME	9/10
Pitchfork	8.9/10
Q	4/5 stars
Rolling Stone	4/5 stars
The Village Voice	A−

The album placed 7th in the 1992 Pazz & Jop Critics Poll. The Toronto Star noted that "Mould's singing has never been better, and it's improved by the judicious use of multi-tracking rather than a back-up singer." The Baltimore Sun wrote that "Copper Blue boasts some of Mould's most consistent writing, but what ultimately gives this album its edge is the way the band's untrammeled intensity seems to heighten the melodic impact of the material."

== Copper Blue Tour ==
In August 2012, Bob Mould and his band (Jason Narducy on bass and Jon Wurster on drums) embarked on a "Copper Blue Tour", playing the album in its entirety at several European and American venues.

== Legacy ==
"The last word in love songs," enthused NME, "and the full stop after heartbreak."

The album was included in the book 1001 Albums You Must Hear Before You Die.

It was voted number 699 in the third edition of Colin Larkin's All Time Top 1000 Albums (2000).

== Track listing ==
All songs written by Bob Mould

No.	Title	Length
1.	"The Act We Act"	5:10
2.	"A Good Idea"	3:47
3.	"Changes"	5:01
4.	"Helpless"	3:05
5.	"Hoover Dam"	5:27
6.	"The Slim"	5:14
7.	"If I Can't Change Your Mind"	3:18
8.	"Fortune Teller"	4:27
9.	"Slick"	4:59
10.	"Man on the Moon"	4:32
Total length:		44:58

== Personnel ==
Credits adapted from the liner notes of Copper Blue.

Sugar

- Bob Mould – guitars, vocals, keyboards, percussion
- David Barbe – bass
- Malcolm Travis – drums, percussion

Production

- Lou Giordano – production, engineering
- Bob Mould – production, engineering
- Tom Bender – mixing
- Howie Weinberg – mastering

== Charts ==
=== Albums ===
Chart (1992)	Peak position
Australian Albums (ARIA)	92
New Zealand Albums (RMNZ)	12
UK Albums Chart (OCC)	10
US Heatseekers Albums (Billboard)	10

Chart (2012)	Peak position
US Heatseekers Albums (Billboard)	8
US Independent Albums (Billboard)	46

=== Singles ===
Title	Chart (1992/1993)	Peak position
"A Good Idea"	UK Singles Chart (OCC)	65
"Helpless"	US Modern Rock Tracks (Billboard)	5
"If I Can't Change Your Mind"	UK Singles Chart (OCC)	30

== Certifications ==
Region	Certification	Certified units/sales
United Kingdom (BPI)	Silver	60,000^{^}
^{^} Shipments figures based on certification alone.
