= Malcolm Travis =

American drummer

- Born: Malcolm Winfield Travis; February 15, 1953 (age 72); Niskayuna, New York, U.S.
- Genres: Rock, Punk
- Instrument: Drums
- Years active: 1978 – present

Malcolm Winfield Travis (born February 15, 1953) is an American drummer from Boston, Massachusetts, best known for his work with Human Sexual Response, the Zulus, Sugar (with Bob Mould and David Barbe), No Man (with Roger Miller of Mission of Burma), and Kustomized (with Peter Prescott, also of Mission of Burma).
