= David Eccles School of Business =

Business school of the University of Utah

Coordinates: 40°45′41″N 111°50′36″W

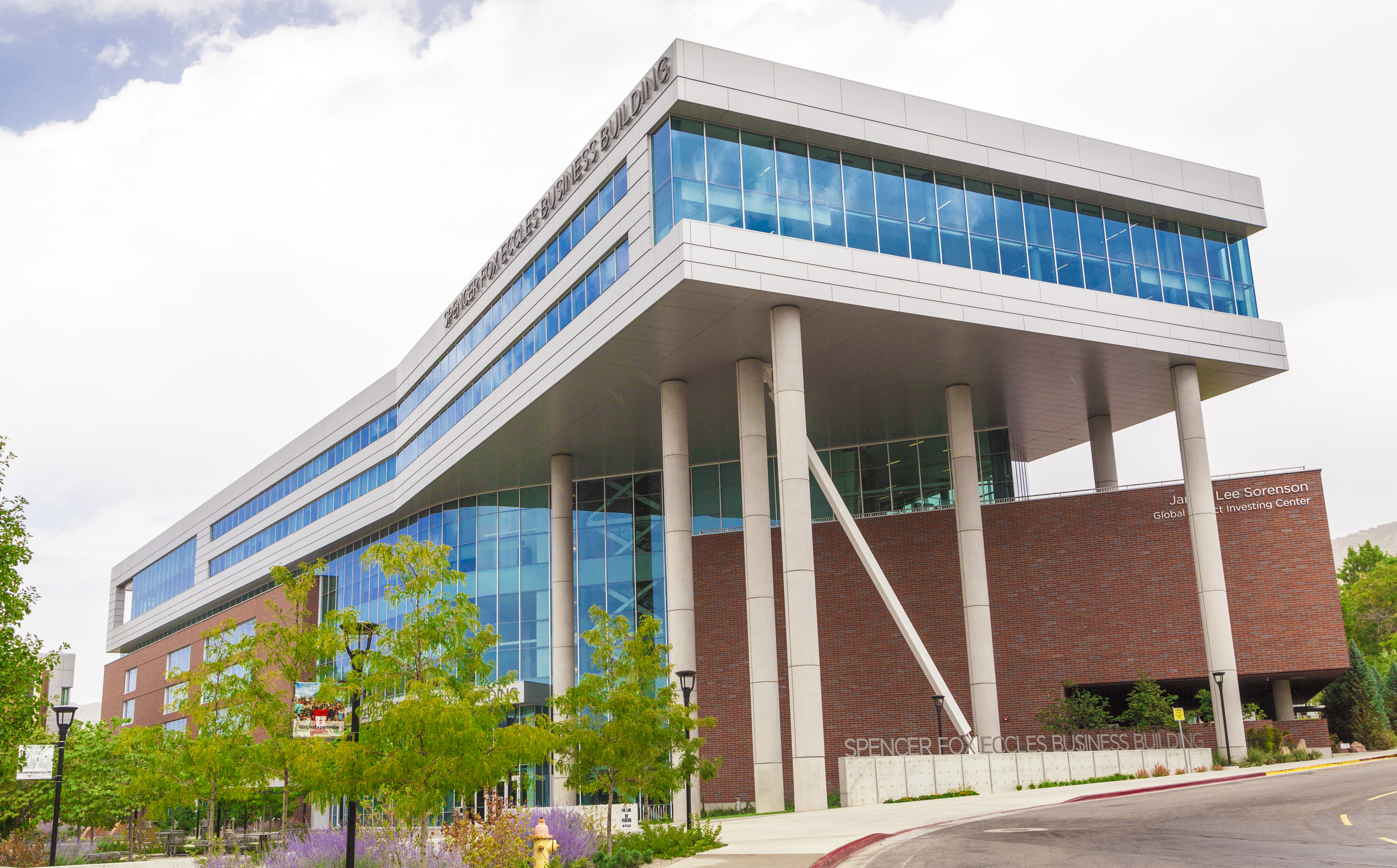
- The Spencer Fox Eccles Business Building
- Former names: School of Commerce & Finance
- Type: Public
- Established: 1917
- Dean: Kurt Dirks
- Faculty: 141
- Undergraduates: 4,409
- Postgraduates: 1,235
- Location: Salt Lake City, Utah, USA
- Campus: Map
- Language: English
- Website: eccles.utah.edu

The David Eccles School of Business is located on the University of Utah campus in Salt Lake City, Utah. The school was founded as the "School of Commerce & Finance" in 1917 and subsequently changed its name to "College of Business" in 1927, although business classes were taught through the Economics & Sociology department at the University starting in 1896. The school currently offers nine undergraduate majors, four MBA programs, nine specialized master's programs, a Ph.D. program, and executive education offerings. The Eccles School has nearly 40,000 alumni in all 50 U.S. states and many countries.

The Eccles School also houses several centers and institutes including the Marriner S. Eccles Institute for Economics and Quantitative Analysis, Lassonde Entrepreneur Institute, the Kem C. Gardner Policy Institute, the Goff Strategic Leadership Center, and the Ivory-Boyer Real Estate Center.

== History ==
In 1896, University of Utah business education was part of the Economics and Sociology Department. The need to expand academic offerings led the University of Utah to establish the School of Commerce and Finance in 1917. In its first year, 126 students enrolled, and over the next 80 years, the enrollment figure increased over 25 times. Today, the David Eccles School of Business educates more than 4,500 students in six departments of study.

In 1927, the name of the school was changed to "College of Business" and course divisions included Accounting, Distribution and Production, Finance, and Economics. In 1933, the first graduate degrees were awarded. The College of Business was officially accredited by the American Association of Collegiate Schools of Business in August 1936. In 1955, the MBA program was instituted at the College of Business. The School's first MBA degrees were awarded in 1957, and its departments were reorganized to Accounting, Finance, Management, and Marketing.

In 1991, a $15 million endowment was given by David Eccles’ youngest daughter, Emma Eccles Jones, to honor the legacy of her late father. With that gift, the school was renamed to the David Eccles School of Business. David Eccles was a leading pioneer industrialist who, in the latter part of the 19th century, founded 48 businesses in various sectors throughout Utah, Idaho, Oregon, and Wyoming.

== Campus ==
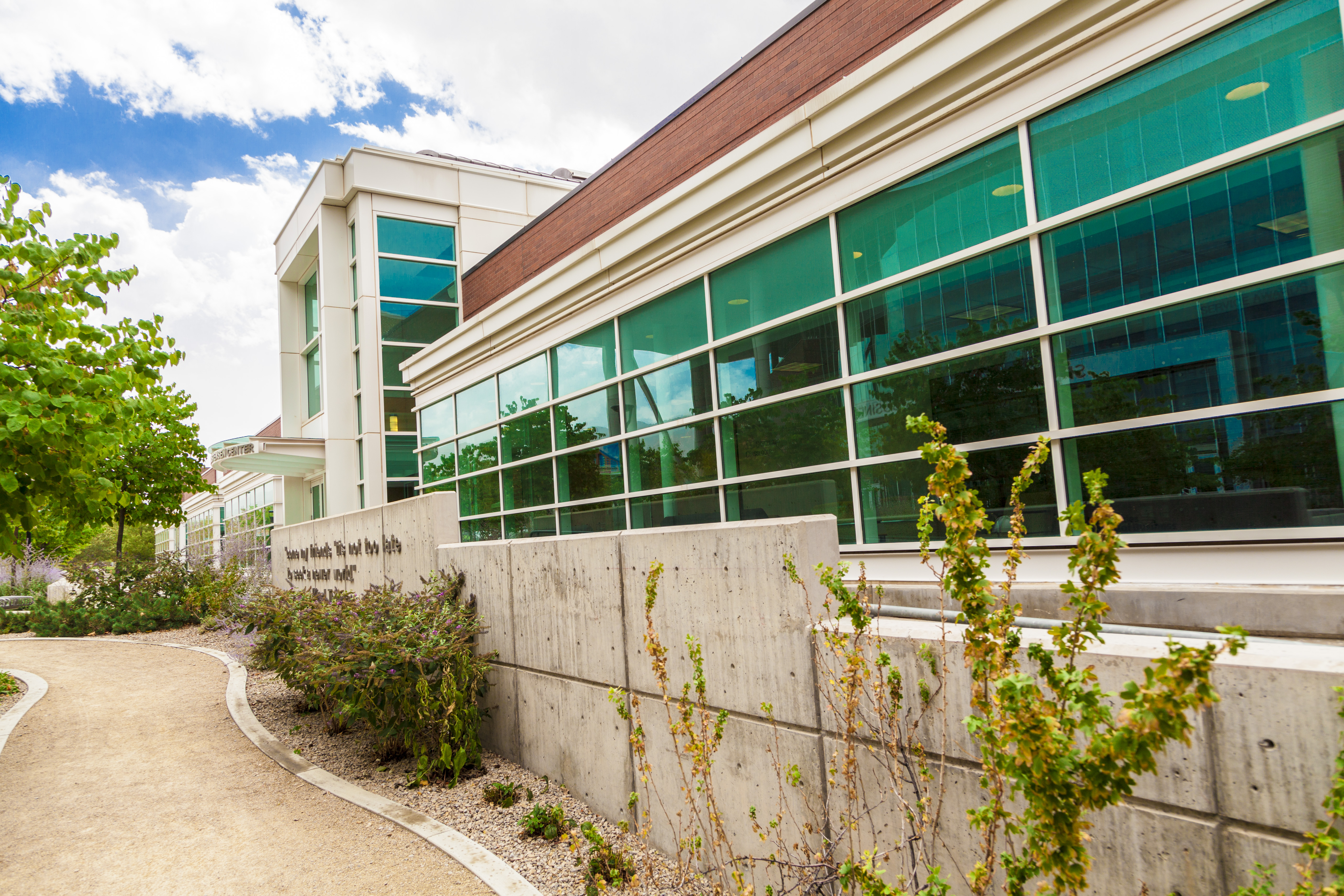
The C. Roland Christensen Center.

The David Eccles School of Business is located on the southern end of campus. Currently, the Eccles School campus includes the Business Classroom Building (BuC), the C. Roland Christensen Center (CRCC), the Spencer Fox Eccles Business Building (SFEBB), and the Robert H. and Katherine B. Garff Building, which opened in Fall 2018.

The SFEBB, the school's flagship building, broke ground in 2011 and had a complete project cost of $72 million. It was the first LEED Certified building on the University of Utah's main campus. Its doors were opened to faculty and staff in November 2012 and to students attending class in January 2013.

== Academics ==
The Eccles School offers undergraduate, master's, MBA, and Ph.D. programs, as well as executive education.

The MBA is offered in four formats: a full-time program, a part-time Professional MBA (PMBA) with evening classes, an MBA Online program, and a weekend-based Executive MBA (EMBA).

Specialized master's degrees include the Master of Accounting, Master of Business Creation, Master of Healthcare Administration, Master of Real Estate Development, and master's degrees in business analytics, cybersecurity management, finance, financial technology, and information systems. The Master of Healthcare Administration program is accredited by the Commission on Accreditation of Healthcare Management Education (CAHME).

The school's nine undergraduate majors are accounting, business administration, entrepreneurship, finance, information systems, management, marketing, operations and supply chain, and quantitative analysis of markets and organizations. It also offers minors in accounting, advanced financial analysis, business, business AI, business analytics, entrepreneurship, fintech, information systems, management, professional selling and business development, and real estate.

In 2019, the school added Lassonde+X, a three-course undergraduate program in entrepreneurship that is open to all University of Utah students.

== Institutes ==
- The Kem C. Gardner Policy Institute, launched in 2015 with support from Utah developer Kem Gardner, conducts economic, demographic and public policy research on Utah. Its initial staff came in part from the university's Bureau of Economic and Business Research.
- The Lassonde Entrepreneur Institute, founded in 2001 with support from alumnus Pierre Lassonde, runs entrepreneurship programs open to students across the university and operates Lassonde Studios, a combined student housing and innovation space.
- The Marriner S. Eccles Institute for Economics and Quantitative Analysis, named for former Federal Reserve chairman Marriner S. Eccles, was established in 2017 with $20 million from Eccles family foundations and the Charles Koch Foundation.

== Rankings ==
Business school rankings

United States
- USNWR MBA: 39

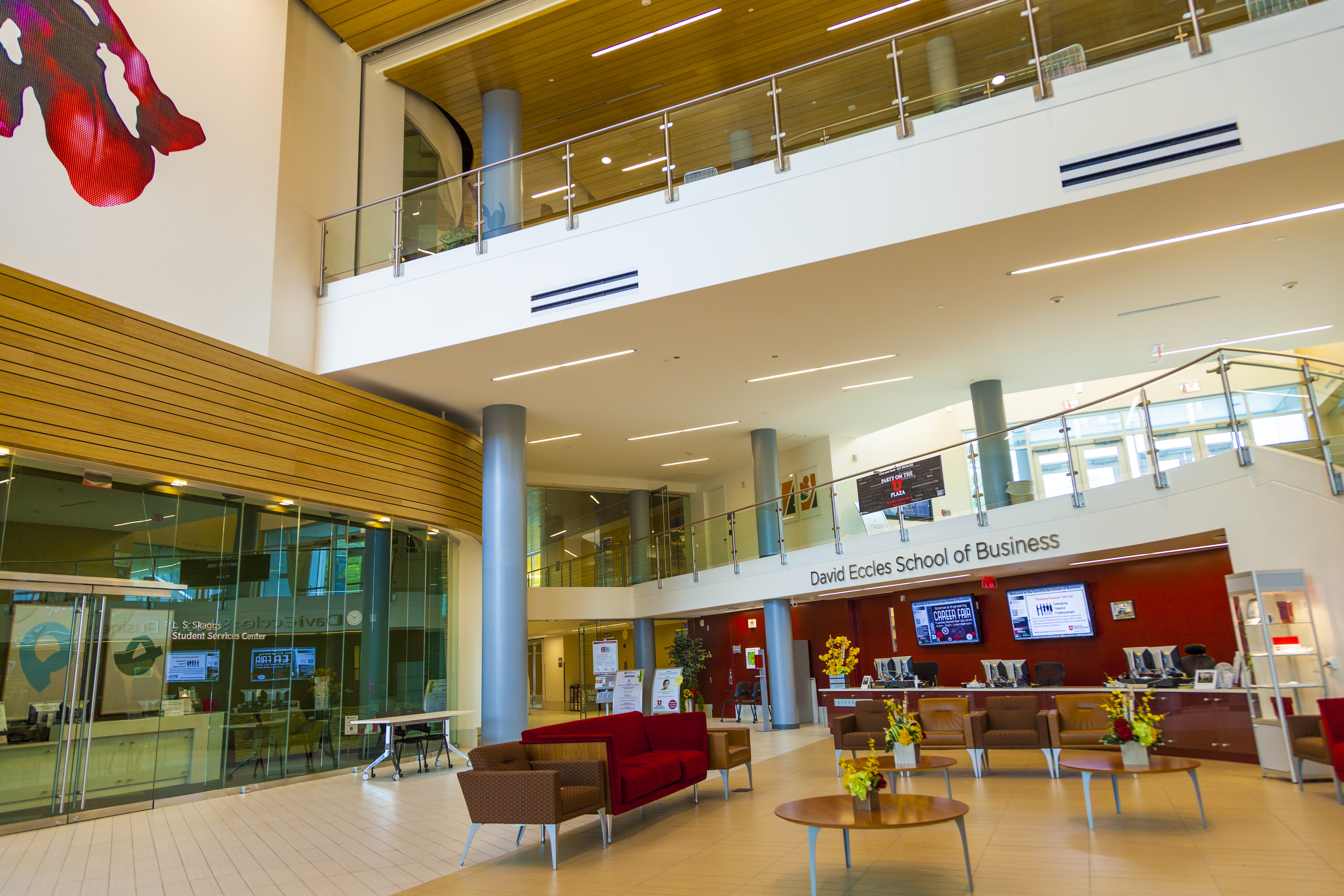
The interior of the Spencer Fox Eccles Business Building.

Rankings of the Eccles School's programs in recent editions of major publications include:

Program	Publisher	Edition	Rank
Full-time MBA	U.S. News & World Report	2026	39 (tie)
Part-time MBA	U.S. News & World Report	2026	35 (tie)
Executive MBA	U.S. News & World Report	2026	32 (tie)
Online MBA	U.S. News & World Report	2026	14 (tie)
Entrepreneurship (graduate)	U.S. News & World Report	2026	10 (tie)
Information systems (graduate)	U.S. News & World Report	2026	34 (tie)
Finance (graduate)	U.S. News & World Report	2026	46 (tie)
Accounting (graduate)	U.S. News & World Report	2026	68 (tie)
Business analytics (graduate)	U.S. News & World Report	2026	73 (tie)
Undergraduate business programs	U.S. News & World Report	2027	50 (tie)
Undergraduate entrepreneurship	U.S. News & World Report	2027	9
Full-time MBA	Bloomberg Businessweek	2026–27	44
Executive MBA	Financial Times	2026	84 (worldwide).
Open-enrollment executive education	Financial Times	2026	27 (worldwide)
Custom executive education	Financial Times	2026	62 (tie, worldwide)
Online MBA	The Princeton Review	2027	14
Entrepreneurship (graduate)	The Princeton Review	2026	10

== People ==
=== Alumni ===
- Jerry Atkin, President and CEO SkyWest Airlines
- Stephen Covey, Co-founder of FranklinCovey and author of the best-selling book, "The Seven Habits of Highly Effective People"
- Spencer Eccles, former chairman and chief executive officer of First Security Corporation
- Robert H. Garff, Ken Garff Corporation
- Jake Garn, U.S. Senator, Space Shuttle astronaut on STS-51-D
- Gregory J. Goff, former Chairman and CEO of Andeavor (formerly Tesoro Corporation)
- Pierre Lassonde, former president of Newmont Mining Corporation and chairman of the World Gold Council
- J. W. Marriott, Jr., Chairman and CEO of Marriott International
- Robert A. "Bob" McDonald, Former United States Secretary of Veterans Affairs; retired Chairman, President, and CEO of Procter & Gamble
- David Neeleman, attended, did not graduate. Founder and chairman of JetBlue Airways, Azul Brazilian Airlines, co-founder of Morris Air

== See also ==
- List of business schools in the United States
- List of United States graduate business school rankings
