= Spencer Eccles =

American philanthropist

Spencer F. Eccles
- Born: August 24, 1934 (age 91); Ogden, Utah, U.S.
- Education: University of Utah (BA); Columbia University (MBA)
- Known for: First Security Corporation, Amalgamated Sugar Company
- Spouse: Cleone Emily Peterson Eccles
- Children: 4
- Relatives: Randal Quarles (son-in-law)
- Awards: Pierre de Coubertin Medal

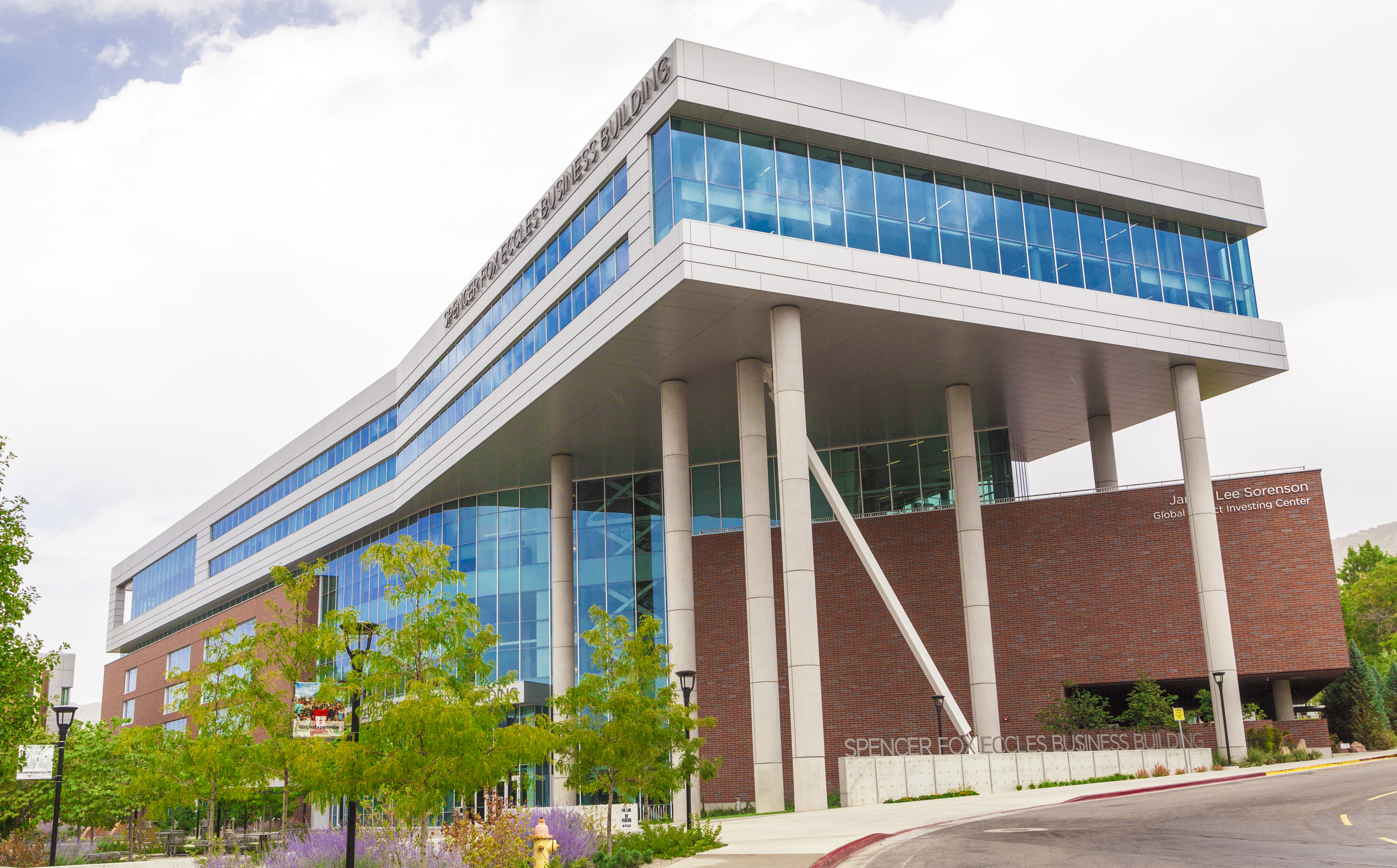
The Spencer Fox Eccles Business Building at the University of Utah

Spencer Fox Eccles (born August 24, 1934, Ogden, Utah) is a prominent financier and philanthropist in Salt Lake City, Utah and chairman emeritus of the Intermountain Region of Wells Fargo Corporation. From 1982 to 2000, he was chairman and chief executive officer of First Security Corporation of Salt Lake City, which was, until its sale to Wells Fargo in 2000, the largest banking organization in the Mountain West measured by assets, deposits and market capitalization.

== Biography ==
Eccles is the son of Spencer Stoddard Eccles and Pauline Hope Fox and the grandson of Ellen Stoddard and David Eccles, a Utah banker and industrialist. He earned a Bachelor of Science in finance in 1956 from the University of Utah, where he was also a member of Beta Theta Pi, and a master of business administration in 1958 from Columbia University School of Business. Eccles is the nephew of both George S. Eccles and Marriner Stoddard Eccles.

In addition to his role at First Security, Eccles has also been a director of the Union Pacific Railroad, Intermountain Health Care, the Federal Reserve Bank of San Francisco, the National Chamber of Commerce, the ZCMI Corporation, the Anderson Lumber Company, Amalgamated Sugar, the Alta Ski Corporation, the U.S. Ski and Snowboard Association, and the National Parks Foundation. He was a member of the three-person executive committee of the Salt Lake Olympic Organizing Committee and, in recognition of his critical contribution to the 2002 Olympic Games in Salt Lake, was appointed mayor of the Olympic Village during the games and received the Pierre de Coubertin Medal from the International Olympic Committee, the Olympic movement's highest honor.

== Family ==
The Eccles family is noted for its philanthropy in the West, and Eccles is actively involved in many of the various Eccles family foundations, including as chairman of the George S. and Dolores Dore Eccles Foundation, the largest philanthropic foundation in Utah, president of the Eccles Family Foundation, which he founded, and of the Marriner S. Eccles Foundation, and trustee of the Emma Eccles Jones Foundation and the Nora Eccles Treadwell Foundation. Utah news organizations have identified Eccles as one of the handful of most influential people in the state, along with the President of the Church of Jesus Christ of Latter-day Saints, the Governor, and Orrin Hatch, the state's former senior senator.

His daughter, Hope Eccles, is married to former Vice Chair of the Federal Reserve Randal Quarles.
