= Mormonism in the Pacific Northwest =

Mormonism has had a long history in the Pacific Northwest of the United States. Mormons have had a large influence on the region's development, as they settled throughout the states of Idaho, Oregon, and Washington, and took part in the construction of the region's early infrastructure, as well as worked in the lumber mills and mines across these states. Today, despite a period of discrimination based on their religious affiliation, the region boasts a relatively large population of members of the Church of Jesus Christ of Latter-day Saints compared to other parts of the United States outside of Utah.

== Early Mormon activity and settlement in the Pacific Northwest ==
On June 15, 1855, Fort Lemhi, the first official Mormon settlement in the Pacific Northwest was founded in what would later be southeast Idaho. However, Mormon missionaries had been serving in Oregon as early as 1850. Ultimately, the Mormon expansion into the Pacific Northwest was widespread and long-lasting.

=== Activity in Idaho ===
In 1858, Fort Lemhi would be abandoned after increased hostilities between the Mormon settlers and the local natives. But not long after, in 1859, a second "LDS colonization effort" would see Mormons establishing the community of Franklin, Idaho.

Tensions with the Shoshone living in the area exploded into what would be called the Bear River Massacre, in which federal soldiers would kill hundreds of natives. According to the LDS, Mormons in nearby Franklin would be tending to the wounds of the United States soldiers, as well as to those of the natives that they could, as they reportedly brought back to Franklin surviving adults and children from the massacre. Despite these hostilities between the natives and the white men, many natives, including Shoshone Chief Sagwitch, a survivor of the massacre, would convert and become a member of the LDS. These baptisms would happen around the same time that a large influx of Mormon settlers entered again into Idaho.

In 1880, many Mormon homesteads would be established along the Snake River Plain, on a scale that would lead some to consider it an "invasion". Oxford, Idaho, a settlement with a local office that would process these homestead claims, was the last town established before this large migration. To this day, southeast Idaho is perhaps the region with the largest population density of Mormons in the Pacific Northwest, both due to its proximity to Utah, and to this historic "colonization" that set the foundation stones of the close ties between southeastern Idaho and Utah.

Despite this large Mormon population, it wouldn't be long before discriminatory laws against the Mormons would be introduced in the state of Idaho, and indeed, across the United States.

=== Activity in Oregon ===
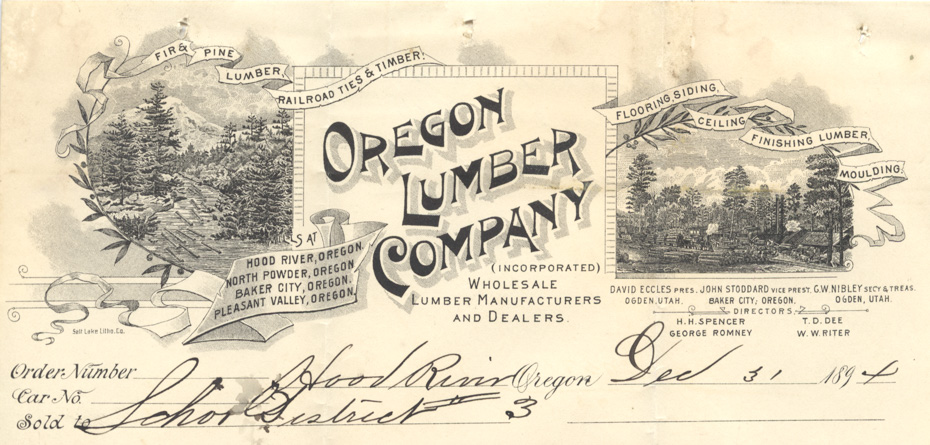
The Oregon Lumber Company, founded by Mormon businessmen David Eccles and Charles Nibley.

In the 1860s Mormons began moving into Idaho to take part in a labor that is well associated with the Pacific Northwest. They would work as loggers, but very few of them would settle in the state as compared to the settlement that took place in Idaho by this time. Here however, is where we see Mormons taking part in the development in one of the region's most quintessential industries, as, in 1887, businessmen that were members of the Church established a lumber mill near Baker, Oregon. This act, combined with the prophecies of Church Elder Franklin D. Richards that there would be stakes in Oregon, led to the further migration of Mormons into the state.

In the mid to late 1890s, mission headquarters were established around the state. Mormon population continued to grow at the beginning of the 20th century, when "ranches were purchased and divided into sugar beet farms", and again during the World Wars era, when work was available to support the war efforts.

=== Activity in Washington ===
Church members, as was done in Oregon, came to Washington State in search of work. They labored on the construction of the railroads, such as the Northern Pacific, and as was done in Oregon, some settled in the area. The area had, at this point, no missions of its own, but was served by several missions based in California.

In 1899, the city of Tacoma would be the site of the organization of the first LDS branch in Washington, followed after by a branch in Seattle in 1902. Several other branches opened in the early 20th century, such as in Spokane and Walla Walla, however, large Mormon migration would not come into the state until the World Wars era, where in 1940 the membership would be around 5,000 people in the state. This would more than double in two decades, as, following the creation of new farmland thanks to the building of the Grand Coulee Dam, it would have reach 11,000 members by 1960.

== Anti-Mormonism in the Pacific Northwest ==
Many Mormons in Idaho were met with discrimination, and were disenfranchised by the local and federal governments. Most notable was the Idaho Test Oath that prohibited any member of the LDS from performing their basic rights as citizens of the United States, including voting, or holding public office.

These Mormon disenfranchisements are theorized to have been the result of attempting to keep Mormons from block voting, as the Mormons were a close-knit group dominating much of southeast Idaho. This theory that the disenfranchisements come from a political standpoint, and not a wholly moral one, argue that the crusade against Mormon polygamy was merely a means to keep Idaho in the hands of the Democratic Party of that time.

The Idaho Test Oath was later repealed by the Idaho state legislature in 1908, where from then on, the government of Idaho did not pursue actions against Mormons unless they violated civil law.

== Lasting presence ==
There is considerable evidence to suggest that Mormonism has had a lasting impact on the development of the Pacific Northwest's cultural identity. Mormons tend to be among the most regular church-goers in the Pacific: "In religious behavior the Northwest differs from both California and the nation. First, there is a relatively low level of religious participation in the West outside of Mormon and some Catholic areas".

LDS Church Members per State	Membership
Idaho	444,614
Oregon	153,936
Washington	287,433

Further population statistics for other states can also be found at The Church of Jesus Christ of Latter-day Saints membership statistics (United States).

== See also ==
- Amalgamated Sugar Company
- Thomas Duncombe Dee
- David Eccles (businessman)
- Charles W. Nibley
- Oregon Lumber Company
- Utah-Idaho Sugar Company
