= Statue of Marriner S. Eccles =

Bronze statue in Salt Lake City, Utah, U.S.

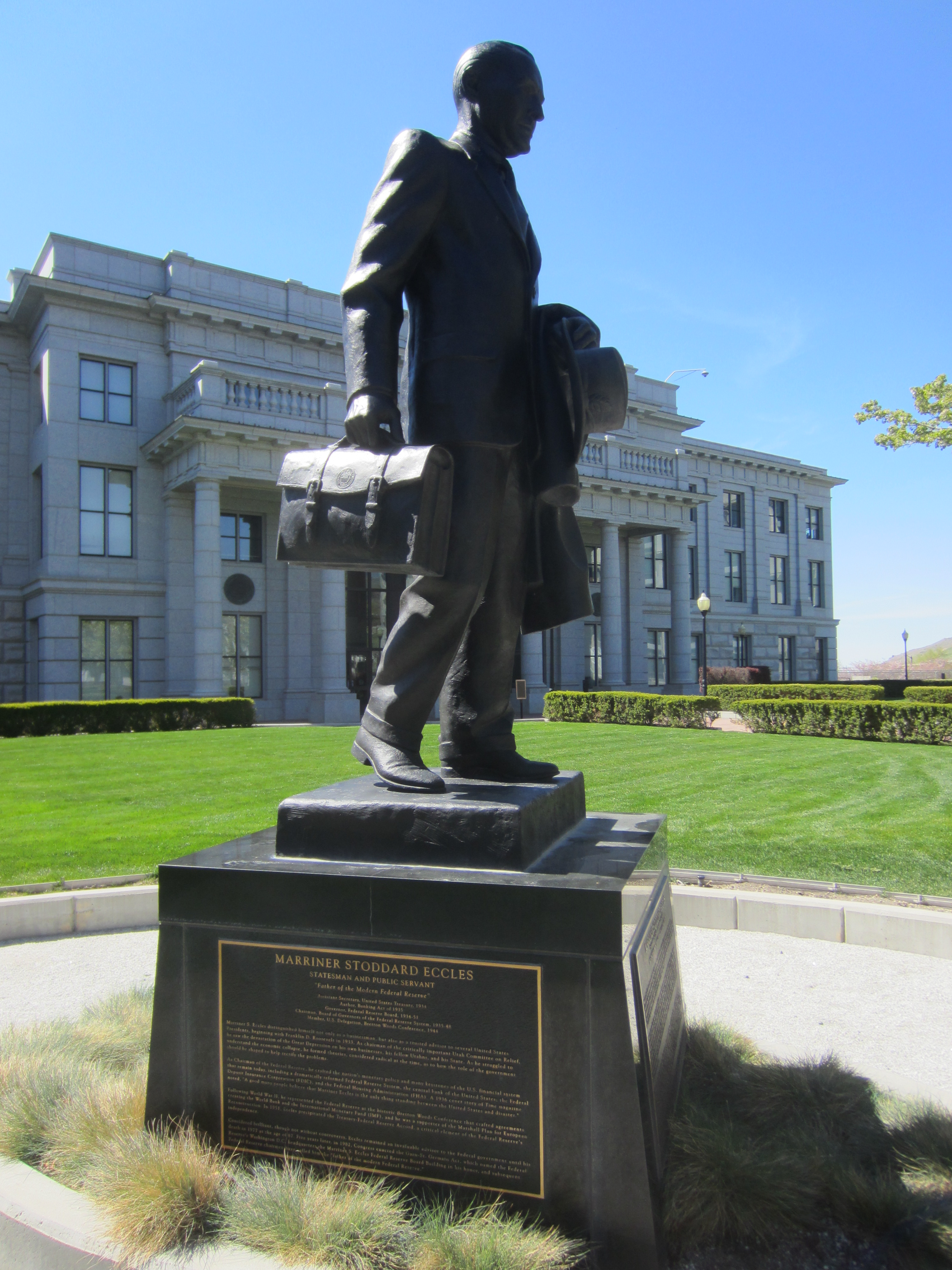
- The statue in 2021
- Artist: Mark DeGraffenried
- Medium: Bronze sculpture
- Subject: Marriner S. Eccles
- Location: Utah State Capitol; Salt Lake City; 40°46′40.5″N 111°53′18.6″W

A 2008 bronze statue of Marriner Stoddard Eccles by James Mark DeGraffenried (born in November 1965) is installed outside the Utah State Capitol in Salt Lake City, Utah.
