= George S. Eccles Ice Center =

Ice Center in Utah, US

- Bridgerland Community Ice Arena
- Interactive map of George S. Eccles Ice Center
- Address: 2825 N 200 E North Logan; US
- Coordinates: 41.783437°N 111.829937°W
- Elevation: 3756 ft
- Type: Ice Rink
- Seating type: Bleacher
- Capacity: 2,000
- Surface: Ice

Construction
- Opened: January 1, 2002

Website
- https://www.ecclesice.com/

The George S. Eccles Ice Center is an indoor ice rink in North Logan, Utah. It serves as the home venue for the Utah State University club hockey team and the Cache Valley Figure Skating Club.

== History ==
Construction of the George S. Eccles Ice Center began in 2000. The facility opened to the public in January 2002. Originally proposed as the Bridgerland Ice Arena, the project was renamed after the George S. and Dolores Doré Eccles Foundation that contributed approximately US$1 million, nearly one-quarter of the total $4.6 million construction cost. The center served as a practice venue for several international teams before and during the 2002 Winter Olympics, and open training sessions drew local spectators. A major renovation in 2004 expanded seating from approximately 1,000 to 2,000 spectators, restoring the facility's original design capacity that had been reduced due to earlier budget limitations.

== Community impact ==
The center serves as the home arena for the Utah State University men's hockey club team and is used by several local organizations, including the Cache Valley Amateur Hockey Association, the Cache Valley Figure Skating Club, and the Cache Valley Stone Society.

During the 2002 Winter Olympics, the center hosted several practice sessions for international teams, while no official competition events were held in Cache Valley. Teams that used the venue included figure skaters from Switzerland, Israel, Korea, and Germany, as well as the Slovak national hockey team and the Chinese speed skating team. The facility offered discounted ice time to teams that opened their practices to spectators, and these sessions attracted local audiences during the Games.

== Governance ==
The center operates as a nonprofit organization and is governed by a board of directors.
