= David Eccles =

David Eccles may refer to:

- David Eccles, 1st Viscount Eccles (1904–1999), British Conservative politician
- David Eccles (businessman) (1849–1912), Scottish-born American businessman
- David Eccles (voice actor), an American voice actor, editor, and composer, known for voicing Krumm in Nickelodeon's Aaahh!!! Real Monsters.
