= Randal Quarles =

American private equity investor and attorney (born 1957)

Randy Quarles
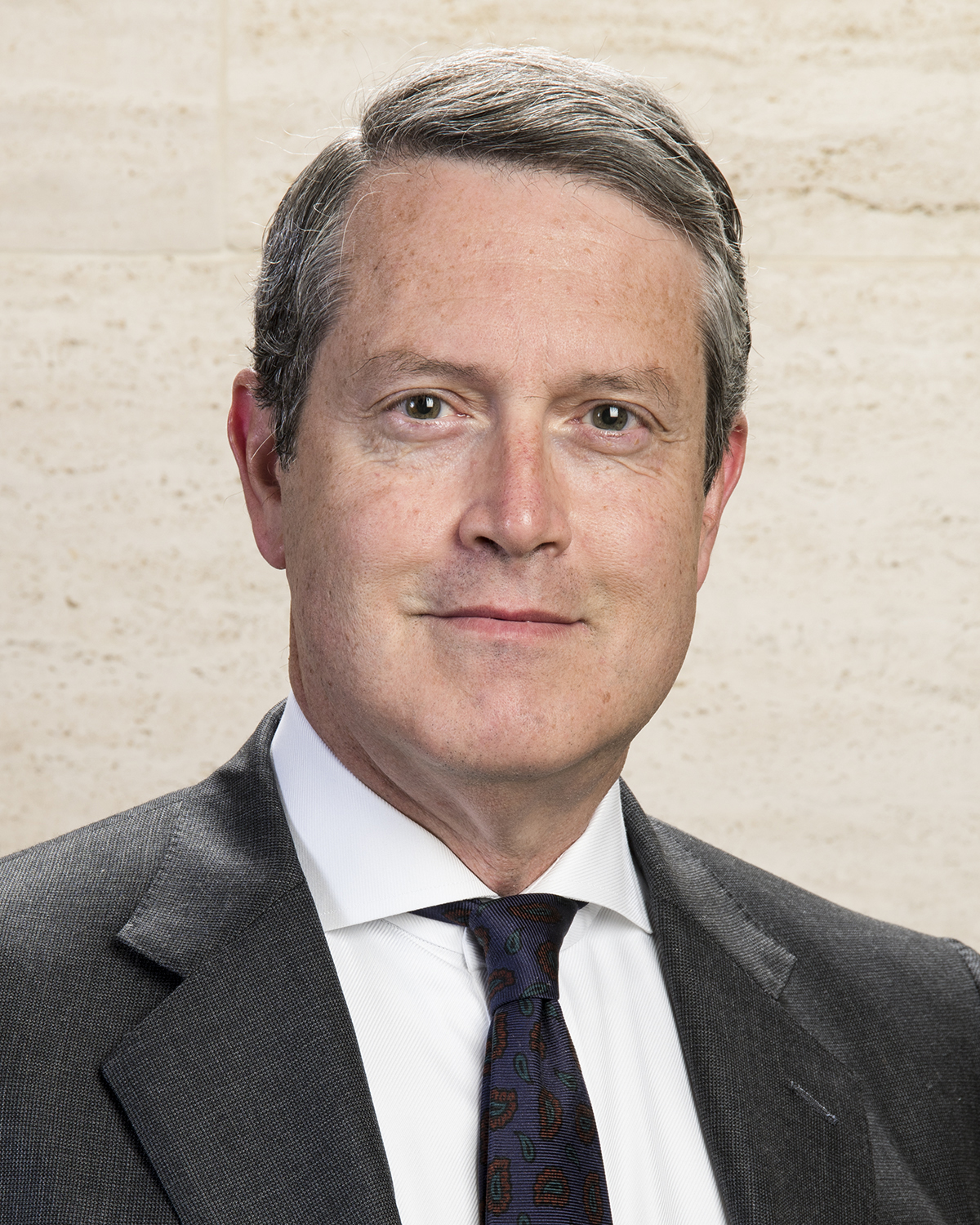

Chair of the Financial Stability Board
- In office November 26, 2018 – December 2, 2021
- Preceded by: Mark Carney
- Succeeded by: Klaas Knot

Vice Chair for Supervision of the Federal Reserve
- In office October 13, 2017 – October 13, 2021
- President: Donald Trump; Joe Biden
- Preceded by: Position established
- Succeeded by: Michael Barr

Member of the Federal Reserve Board of Governors
- In office October 13, 2017 – December 25, 2021
- President: Donald Trump; Joe Biden
- Preceded by: Jeremy C. Stein
- Succeeded by: Michael Barr

15th Under Secretary of the Treasury for Domestic Finance
- In office August 8, 2005 – October 13, 2006
- President: George W. Bush
- Preceded by: Brian Roseboro
- Succeeded by: Robert K. Steel

Assistant Secretary of the Treasury for International Finance and Development
- In office April 2001 – August 8, 2005
- President: George W. Bush
- Preceded by: Edwin M. Truman
- Succeeded by: Clay Lowery

Personal details
- Born: Randal Keith Quarles; September 5, 1957 (age 68) San Francisco, California, U.S.
- Party: Republican
- Spouse: Hope Eccles
- Relations: Spencer Eccles (father-in-law)
- Children: 3
- Education: Columbia University (BA); Yale University (JD)
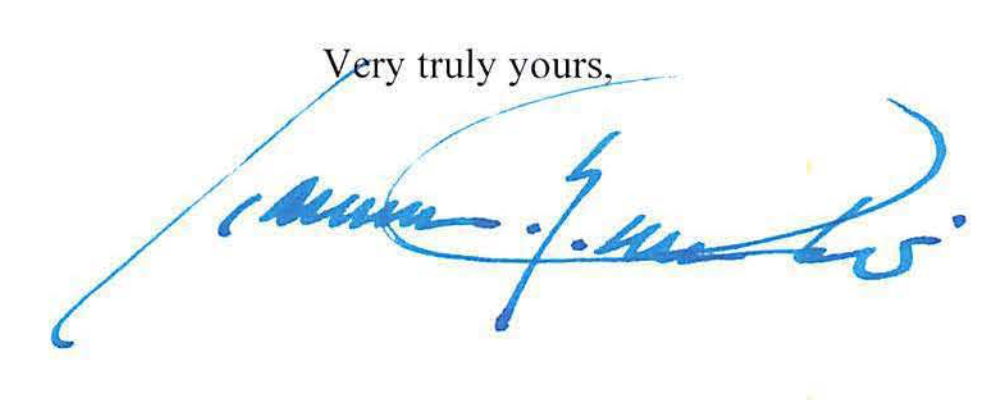
- Signature

Randal Keith Quarles (born September 1957) is an American private equity investor and attorney who served as the first Vice Chair for Supervision of the Federal Reserve from 2017 to 2021. He concurrently served as the chair of the Financial Stability Board from 2018 to 2021.

From August 2001 until October 2006, Quarles held several financial policy posts in the George W. Bush administration, ultimately serving as Under Secretary of the Treasury for Domestic Finance. After leaving the Bush administration, he became the founder and head of The Cynosure Group, a private investment firm, and a former managing director of The Carlyle Group, one of the world's largest private equity firms. In 2012, Quarles was widely mentioned as a possible Treasury Secretary or senior White House adviser in future Republican administrations.

In July 2017, Quarles was nominated by President Donald Trump to be board member and vice chair for supervision of the Federal Reserve System. He was confirmed by the United States Senate on October 5, 2017, by a 65–32 vote on the board seat and by voice vote on the vice chair position. The bank supervision position had been created under the 2010 Dodd-Frank financial law but had never before 2017 been filled. He left the role of Vice Chair for Supervision in 2021 and retired from the Federal Reserve in 2021.

== Early life and education ==
Born in San Francisco, Quarles was raised in Roy, Utah, graduating from Roy High School in 1975. He then studied philosophy and economics at Columbia College, Columbia University, graduating with a B.A., summa cum laude, in 1981. While at Columbia, Quarles took a two-year leave of absence to serve as a volunteer missionary for the Church of Jesus Christ of Latter-day Saints in Quebec. He then attended Yale Law School, graduating with a JD in 1984.

== Career ==
=== Early career ===
Upon graduation from Yale, Quarles was hired as an associate at the Wall Street law firm of Davis Polk & Wardwell. He spent most of his career there in the New York office but also worked in the London office from 1987 to 1989. He specialized in financial institutions law, eventually becoming co-head of the firm's Financial Institutions Group and advising on transactions that included a number of the largest financial sector mergers ever completed.

=== George H.W. Bush administration ===
In 1990, Nicholas Brady, Treasury Secretary under George H. W. Bush, asked Quarles to join a team working to develop the governmental response to the savings and loan crisis in the financial sector and to propose improvements for the financial regulatory system going forward. Quarles served in the first Bush administration as Special Assistant to the Secretary of the Treasury for Banking Legislation and as Deputy Assistant Secretary of the Treasury for Financial Institutions Policy, returning to the law firm of Davis Polk & Wardwell in January 1993.

=== George W. Bush administration ===
In 2001, Secretary Paul O'Neill asked Quarles to return to the Treasury, where he served until the mid-term elections in 2006. At the Treasury, Quarles was a senior official under all three of George W. Bush's Treasury Secretaries and developed policy on an unusually broad range of matters in both domestic and international financial affairs.

As Under Secretary, Quarles led the Department's activities in financial sector and capital markets policy, including coordination of the President's Working Group on Financial Markets, development of administration policy on hedge funds and derivatives, regulatory reform of Fannie Mae and Freddie Mac, and proposing fundamental reform of the U.S. financial regulatory structure.

Quarles also was the lead advocate for imposing greater regulation on Fannie Mae and Freddie Mac, arguing that they posed significant risk to the financial sector, and argued for fundamental reform of the entire financial regulatory system—extending broader and more uniform federal regulation to investment banks and insurance companies—because the current system restricted regulators' ability to observe and limit risk in the system.

From April 2002 until August 2005, Quarles was Assistant Secretary of the Treasury for International Affairs. Quarles had a leading role in issues ranging from Chinese currency policy to the Argentine debt default, and from Iraqi and Afghan economic reconstruction to the reform of collective action in sovereign debt agreements. In addition, Quarles was the policy chair of the Committee on Foreign Investment in the United States, which reviews potential investments that raise national security issues, and negotiated the historic debt relief agreement for the world's poorest countries reached at the G7 meetings in London in 2005.

From August 2001 until April 2002, Quarles was the U.S. Executive Director of the International Monetary Fund, where he represented the United States in negotiations over the IMF's response to financial crises in Argentina and Turkey.

In his earlier positions in the administration he had a key role in response to several international crises—the Argentine debt default, as well as near defaults in Brazil, Turkey and Uruguay—and chaired the international working group that led to changes in the terms of sovereign debt finance that now permit collective action by creditors in such crises. He also argued strongly for improving international coordination of financial regulation, initiating a regular dialogue with the European Union on financial regulatory matters and representing the United States at the Financial Stability Forum. He negotiated the historic debt relief agreement for the world's poorest countries reached at the G7 Meetings in London during 2005.

At the time of his departure from government, Hank Paulson, the Treasury Secretary, noted that he had played a role in an unusually large range of matters in the history of the Treasury – "from the Argentine debt default to terrorism risk insurance, and from Chinese currency flexibility to GSE reform", and awarded him the Alexander Hamilton Medal, the Treasury Department's highest honor.

=== Carlyle Group ===
After his departure from the Treasury, Quarles joined the Carlyle Group, a leading private equity firm, to help the firm develop a focus on transactions in the financial services sector.

=== Cynosure Group ===
After his departure from Carlyle, Quarles led the Cynosure Group which manages the money of the Eccles family (Quarles's wife's family) among others. The family forebears included David Eccles (1849–1912), who emigrated from Scotland sailing on the Cynosure who subsequently became a successful businessman and Utah's first multimillionaire, and his son Marriner Stoddard Eccles (1890–1977), who was a U.S. banker, economist, and Chairman of the Federal Reserve. The Eccles Building that houses the headquarters of the Federal Reserve in Washington, D.C. is named after Marriner Eccles.

=== Federal Reserve Board ===
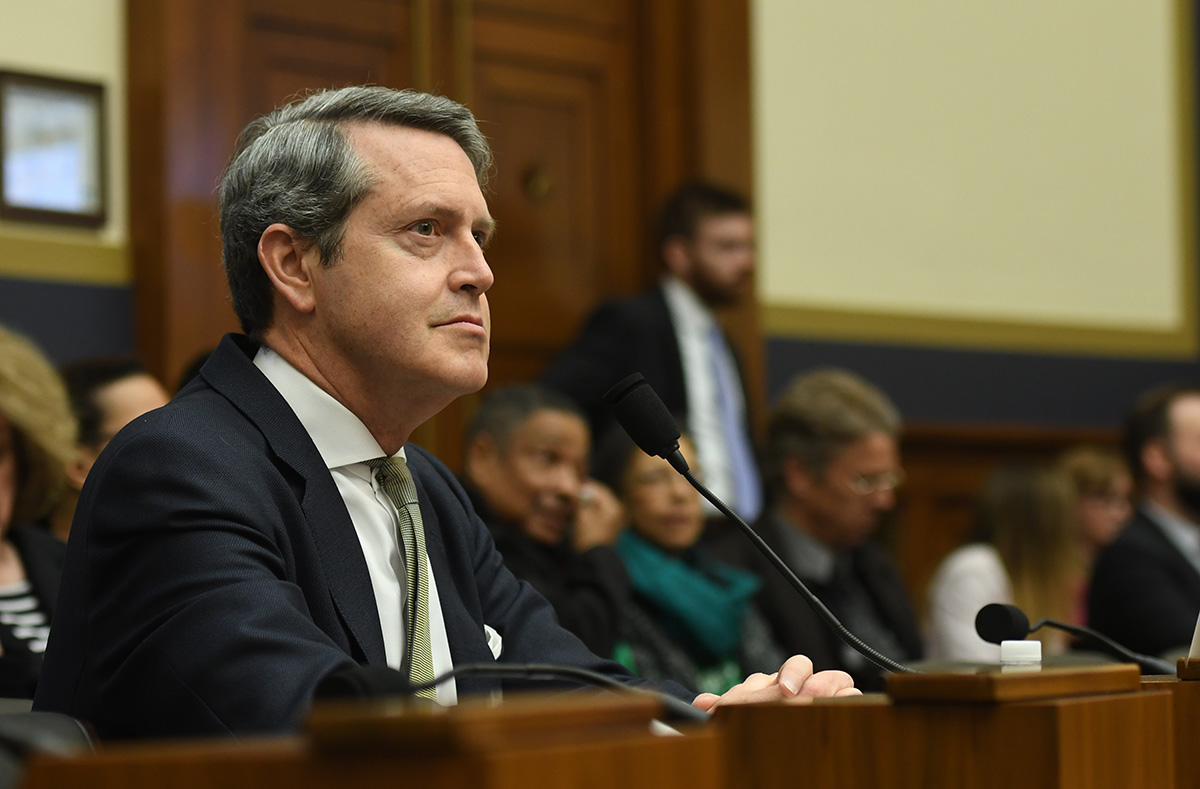
Quarles testifies in 2018 before the House Committee on Financial Services as Vice Chairman for Supervision

On July 10, 2017, Quarles was nominated by President Donald Trump to fill a vacant position on the Federal Reserve Board of Governors expiring January 31, 2018, a new 14-year term expiring January 31, 2032, and also the position of Vice Chair for Supervision of the Federal Reserve for a four-year term. The position of Vice Chairman for Supervision had previously remained unfilled since its creation under the Dodd-Frank Act in 2010.

Quarles was confirmed by the United States Senate on October 5, 2017 for the vacant seat expiring early in 2018 by a vote of 65–32, as well as for the position of Vice Chairman for Supervision by a voice vote. However, the Senate did not vote on his nomination to the seat expiring in 2032, but instead returned his nomination to the President at the end of the first session of the 115th Congress, per Senate rule XXXI, Section 6. He continued to serve on the Board as an acting member pending his renomination January 8, 2018, and ultimate confirmation July 17, 2018, by a vote of 66–33.

"By deciding to move banks into large-bank oversight much later [during his tenure], Mr. Quarles and his colleagues had created a system that treated even sizable and rapidly ballooning banks with a light touch when it came to how aggressively they were monitored...As a result, Silicon Valley Bank’s move to the more rigorous oversight group would be delayed. The bank would previously have advanced to the Large and Foreign Bank Organization group after its assets had averaged more than $50 billion for a year; now, that shift would not come until it consistently averaged more than $100 billion in assets."

Quarles resigned from the board in December 2021, following the conclusion of his tenure as vice chairman for supervision in October 2021.

== Personal life ==
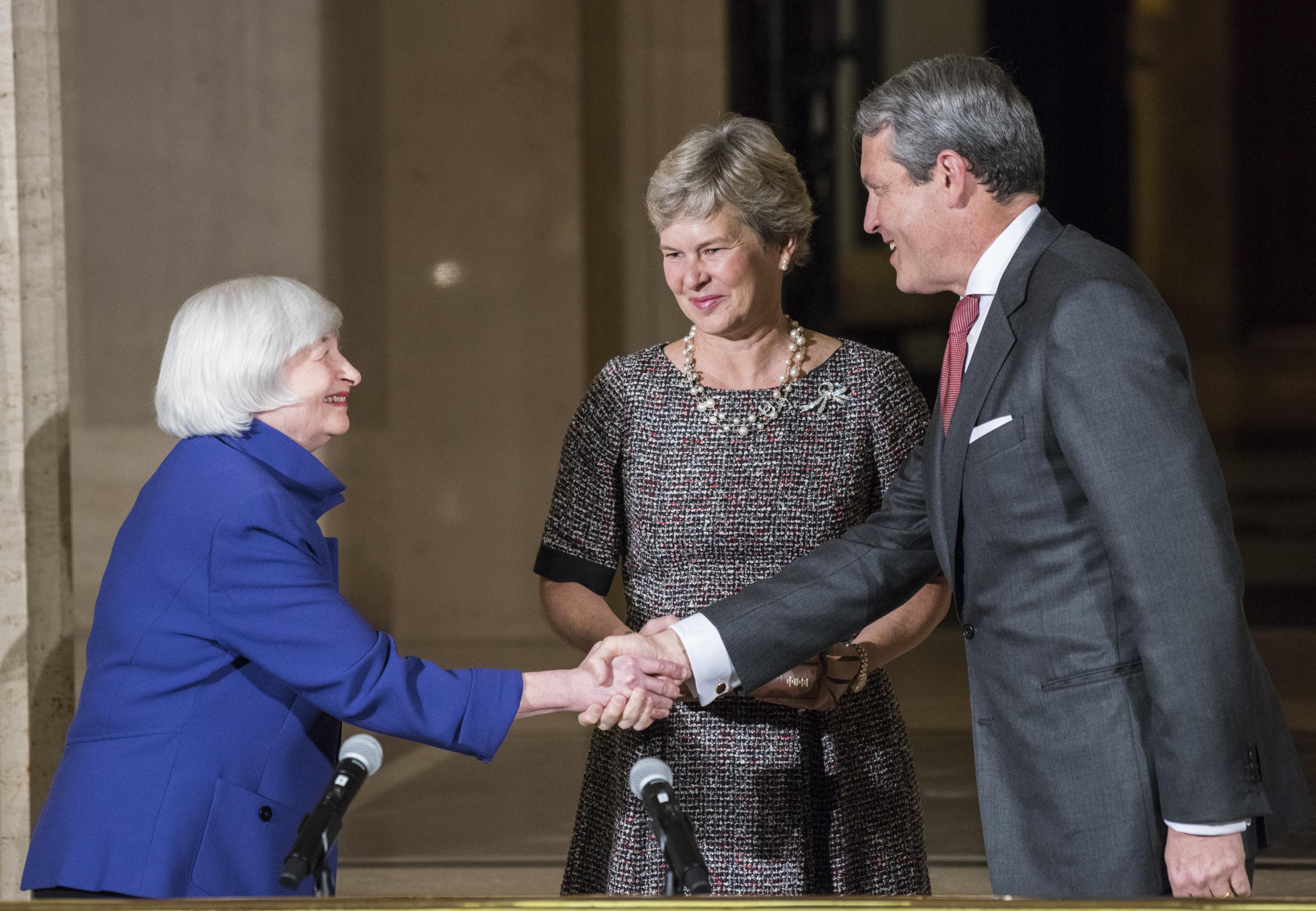
Randal and Hope Quarles shake hands with Chair Janet Yellen in 2017 shortly after Quarles is sworn in

Quarles's wife, Hope, is the daughter of Utah businessman Spencer Eccles, whose father, Spencer Stoddard Eccles, was the brother of Marriner S. Eccles. Quarles is a member of the Church of Jesus Christ of Latter-day Saints.

In November 2017, an investigation conducted by the International Consortium of Investigative Journalists cited his name in the "Paradise Papers", in connection with an offshore bank that was under investigation for tax evasion. The documents tracked transactions between one of Quarles’s offshore vehicles and Butterfield Bank, through which The Carlyle Group had completed a $550m investment in 2010.

Quarles was appointed as vice chairman of Singapore Gulf Bank's global advisory board in May 2025.

== See also ==
- List of people and organizations named in the Paradise Papers

Political offices
Preceded by Edwin M. Truman	Assistant Secretary of the Treasury for International Finance and Development; 2001–2005	Succeeded by Clay Lowery
Preceded by Brian C. Roseboro	Under Secretary of the Treasury for Domestic Finance; 2005–2006	Succeeded by Robert K. Steel
Government offices
Preceded by Jeremy C. Stein	Member of the Federal Reserve Board of Governors; 2017–2021	Succeeded by Michael Barr
New office	Vice Chair for Supervision of the Federal Reserve; 2017–2021	Succeeded by Michael Barr
Diplomatic posts
Preceded by Mark Carney	Chair of the Financial Stability Board; 2018–2021	Succeeded by Klaas Knot
