= Legal Hospice of Texas =

Nonprofit law firm

Legal Hospice of Texas is a nonprofit lawfirm providing compassionate legal services at no charge to low income individuals who are terminally ill or HIV positive.

== Work ==
One source of funds for these services are IOLTA funds distributed through the Texas Access to Justice Foundation. It is likely these funds are in danger because of falling interest rates. Even so, The Legal Hospice of Texas was one of 6 nonprofits in the DFW-area to receive 2010-2011 Grant awards.

They also raise money from individual donors, foundations, businesses and other government programs like the Combined Federal Campaign and Cy Pres. Donors include the Harold Simmons Foundation, Max & Victoria Dreyfus Foundation, Graham & Carolyn Holloway Family Foundation, The Joule Hotel, the B.B. Owen Trust, Odyssey VistaCare Hospice Foundation, Ryan White Care Act, the Vanberg Family Foundation, Black Tie Dinner and Kraft Foods. Oscar Fierro, a Dallas designer, recently hosted a runway show where all proceeds were dedicated to the Legal Hospice.
