= Sherman J. Maisel =

American economist and government official (1918–2010)

Sherman Maisel
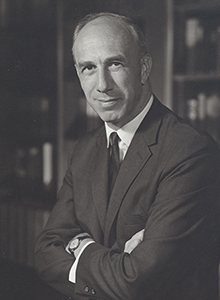

Member of the Federal Reserve Board of Governors
- In office April 30, 1965 – May 31, 1972
- President: Lyndon B. Johnson; Richard Nixon
- Preceded by: Abbot Mills
- Succeeded by: Jeffrey Bucher

Personal details
- Born: Sherman Joseph Maisel; July 8, 1918; Buffalo, New York, U.S.
- Died: September 29, 2010 (aged 92); San Francisco, California, U.S.
- Education: Harvard University (BA, MPA, MA, PhD)

Sherman Joseph Maisel (July 8, 1918 – September 29, 2010) was an American economist who served as a member of the Federal Reserve Board of Governors from 1965 to 1972. Research on mortgage policy conducted by Maisel led to the expansion of the roles played by Fannie Mae and Ginnie Mae in encouraging the broader availability of loans to homeowners.

== Life and career ==
Maisel was born on July 8, 1918, in Buffalo, New York. After completing his undergraduate degree in economics from Harvard University in 1939, Maisel worked as a research economist working for the Federal Reserve Board in Washington, D.C. He served in the United States Army during World War II beginning in 1941, attaining the rank of Captain by the time he completed his military service in 1945. After a brief career for the Foreign Service in Brussels, Maisel returned to Harvard, where he earned Master of Public Administration and a Master of Arts in economics in 1947 and 1948 and was awarded a Ph.D. in 1949.

Hired by the Haas School of Business in 1948, Maisel helped establish the school's Center for Real Estate and Urban Economics. Maisel became involved in local politics, and was elected to the board of education of the Berkeley Unified School District, serving from 1962 to 1965. After the board approved a plan to address segregation in the district's junior high schools, Maisel faced and won a recall election, in which he encouraged students at the University of California, Berkeley to register and participate in the vote. When he was nominated to serve as a governor of the Federal Reserve System, he met with President Lyndon B. Johnson, who expressed more interest in the details of the Berkeley recall vote than in Maisel's opinions on economic policy.

Research performed by Maisel concluded that the traditional pattern of local savings and loan associations making mortgage loans to home buyers exacerbated recessions because they were less willing to lend during economic downturns. As a member of a White House task force on mortgage policy, Maisel and his colleagues recommended that Ginnie Mae should provide guarantees for mortgage-backed securities and that Fannie Mae should be operated independently of the federal budget. These changes were intended to provide greater liquidity to the mortgage market, which would add to economic activity in up or down markets by making it easier to obtain mortgages.

As a member of the National Bureau of Economic Research's senior research staff from 1978 to 1980, he worked on a project for the national Science Foundation that studied how government insurance of bank accounts effected capital and risk levels assumed by banks and other lending institutions. The group's findings exposed the moral hazard that existed based on the access to guaranteed funds and from the focus on book value rather than real net worth. The group's recommendations were not followed, and many of the changes the group opposed were implemented, factors that helped exacerbate the savings and loan crisis in the 1980s and cost the federal government billions in rescue costs of bad loans.

After his seven-year term expired in 1972, Maisel returned to California and resumed teaching at Haas until his retirement in 1986. He was a fellow of the American Finance Association, and was the organization's president in 1973.

Maisel died in San Francisco at the age of 92 on September 29, 2010, due to respiratory failure. He was survived by his wife, Lucy Cowdin Maisel, who died on June 17, 2019, from respiratory failure. Lucy and Sherman met in 1939 when they were both interns with the National Institute for Public Affairs. He was survived by a daughter, Margaret Maisel of Miami, Florida a son, Larry Maisel of London, England and two grandchildren Nicholas Maisel of Los Angeles, And Elena Horowitz of West Palm Beach, Florida.

== Publications ==
- Sherman J. Maisel (1973). Managing the Dollar. Norton. ISBN 978-0-393-05494-1.
- Sherman J. Maisel (1992). Real Estate Finance. Harcourt Brace Jovanovich. ISBN 978-0-15-575852-0.
- Macroeconomics: Theories and Policies. New York: W.W. Norton, 1982.
- Risk and Capital Adequacy in Commercial Banks. U. of Chicago Press, 1981. Midway Reprint Edition, 1986.

Government offices
Preceded by Abbot Mills	Member of the Federal Reserve Board of Governors; 1965–1972	Succeeded by Jeffrey Bucher
