= Abbot Mills =

American economist and government official (1898–1986)

Abbot Low Mills Jr.

Member of the Federal Reserve Board of Governors
- In office February 18, 1952 – February 28, 1965
- President: Harry Truman; Dwight Eisenhower; John F. Kennedy; Lyndon B. Johnson
- Preceded by: Marriner S. Eccles
- Succeeded by: Sherman J. Maisel

Personal details
- Born: Abbot Low Mills Jr. September 26, 1898 Portland, Oregon, U.S.
- Died: May 19, 1986 (aged 87) Portland, Oregon, U.S.
- Political party: Republican
- Education: Harvard College (BA)

Abbot Low Mills Jr. (September 26, 1898 – May 19, 1986) was an American economist who served as a member of the Federal Reserve Board of Governors from 1952 to 1965.

Government offices
Preceded by Marriner S. Eccles	Member of the Federal Reserve Board of Governors; 1952–1965	Succeeded by Sherman J. Maisel
