= Valhi, Inc. =

- Type: Public
- Traded as: NYSE: VHI; Russell 2000 Index component
- Industry: holding company
- Founded: 1987
- Headquarters: Dallas, Texas, U.S.
- Key people: Robert D. Graham, Vice Chairman of the Board, President and CEO
- Products: titanium dioxide pigments (TiO2), security products, recreational marine products, real estate, water distribution, insurance
- Revenue: ▲US$2.296 Billion (FY 2021)
- Operating income: ▲US$ 257.8 Million (FY 2021)
- Net income: ▲US$ 127.2 Million (FY 2021)
- Total assets: ▲US$3.005 Billion (FY 2021)
- Total equity: ▲US$1.158 Billion (FY 2021)
- Number of employees: ▲2,847
- Website: Valhi.net

Valhi, Inc. is an American holding company operating through wholly and majority-owned subsidiaries in a number of different industries. It was founded in 1987 as a result of the merger of the LLC Corporation and Amalgamated Sugar Company. As of 2014 it was a Fortune 1000 company.

Until his death in 2013, the chairman of the company was Harold Simmons,. He also owned 94% of Valhi's common stock, through The Contran Corporation and a charitable trust controlled by his family.

== Subsidiaries ==
Wholly and majority-owned subsidiaries include 80% of Kronos Worldwide, 86% of CompX International Inc., 83% of NL Industries, Basic Management, Inc. and The LandWell Company. Former subsidiaries include Amalgamated Sugar Company, oilfield services firm Baroid, forest products firm Medford, and Arby's franchise Sybra.
