= Amalga, Utah =

Town in the state of Utah, United States

- Town
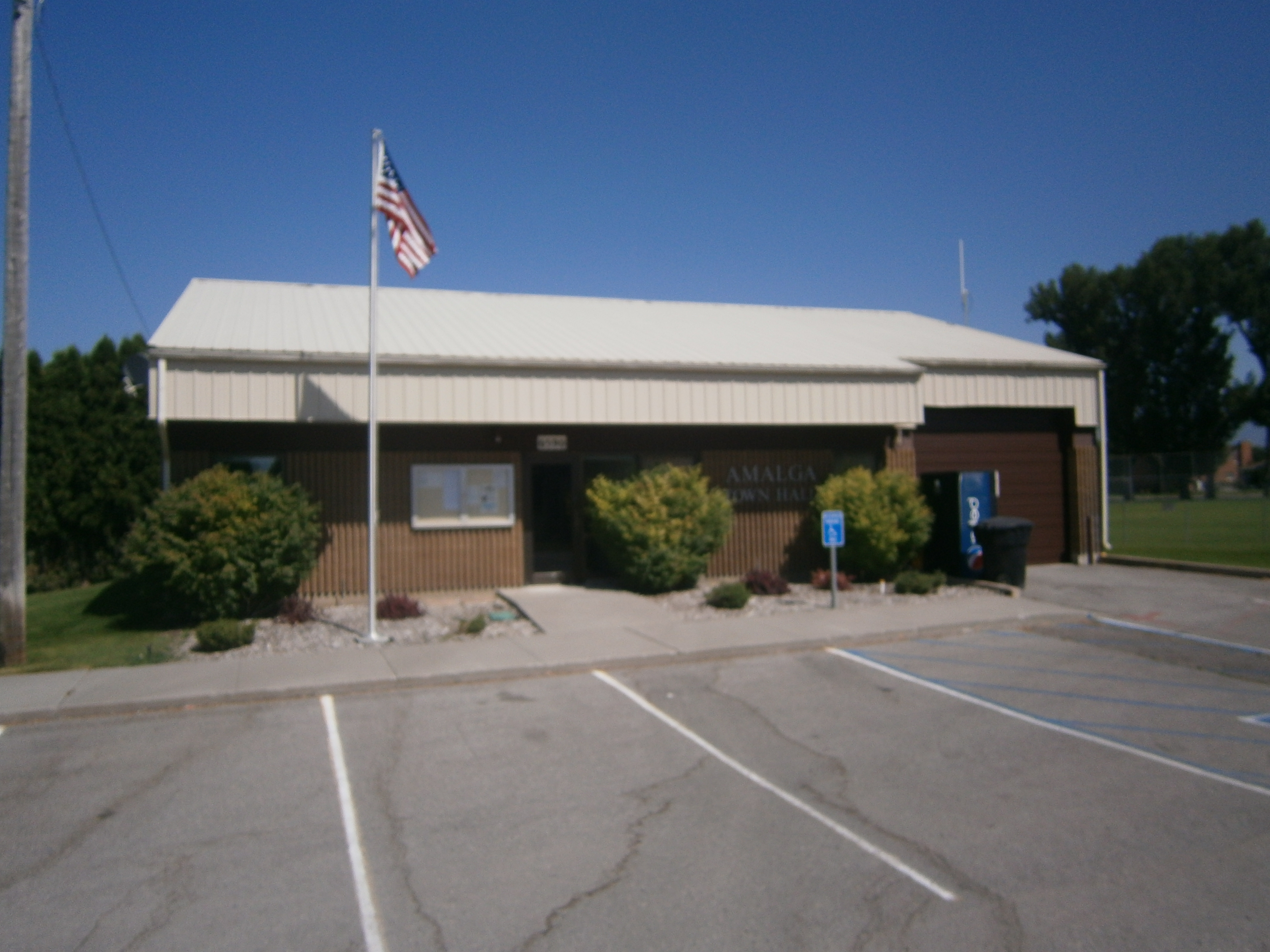
- Amalga Town Hall

- Location in Cache County and the state of Utah.
- Coordinates: 41°52′30″N 111°53′48″W
- Country: United States
- State: Utah
- County: Cache
- Settled: 1869
- Incorporated: 1938
- Founded by: Hans Jorgensen
- Named after: Amalgamated Sugar Company

Area
  - Total: 3.61 sq mi (9.35 km^{2})
  - Land: 3.48 sq mi (9.02 km^{2})
  - Water: 0.12 sq mi (0.32 km^{2})
- Elevation: 4,446 ft (1,355 m)

Population (2020)
  - Total: 482
  - Density: 160.1/sq mi (61.83/km^{2})
- Time zone: UTC-7 (MST)
  - Summer (DST): UTC-6 (MDT)
- ZIP code: 84335
- Area code: 435
- FIPS code: 49-01090
- GNIS feature ID: 2412359
- Website: www.amalgautah.gov

Amalga (/əˈmælɡə/ ə-MAL-gə) is a town in Cache County, Utah, United States. The population was 482 at the 2020 census. It is included in the Logan, Utah-Idaho (partial) Metropolitan Statistical Area.

Many of the town's population are dairy farmers, with many families owning their own herds. The town contains the Schreiber Foods plant. Nearby Smithfield shares its post office and library with the town.

== History ==
Amalga was settled by Latter-Day Saint settler Hans Jorgensen in 1869. Other settlers began arriving in 1891. By March 22, 1891, when the Alto Branch of the LDS Church was organized, the town had a schoolhouse that was used for social gatherings and church meetings.

In 1916, the Amalgamated Sugar Company agreed to build a factory in town to process sugar beets, and the town name became Amalga. A spur line was established by the Utah Idaho Central Railroad, and a large hotel opened. The factory, built by Dyer Construction Company, was built by the 1917 season for $900,000.

Coinciding with the organization of the city, the Amalga Ward of the LDS Church was established on March 10, 1918, choosing its name from the Amalgamated Sugar Company.

The factory was shut down in 1929 due to the sugar beet blight. The equipment was dismantled and reassembled in Sacramento, California. The hotel was torn down, as were the workers' houses. The railroad was also removed, and sugar beets were shipped by truck to Smithfield, then taken to a factory in Lewiston for processing. The warehouse and land was sold to the "Tueller brothers" in late 1937.

In 1941, the Cache Valley Dairy Association purchased the former sugar beet plant to allow the co-op to process their own milk into Swiss cheese. The co-op hired Edwin Gossner to produce the cheese, which he did from 1942 until 1966, when he left to form Gossner Foods in west Logan.

== Geography ==
According to the United States Census Bureau, the town has a total area of 3.5 square miles (9.1 km^{2}), of which 3.4 square miles (8.7 km^{2}) is land and 0.2 square mile (0.4 km^{2}) (4.26%) is water. Most of the water is in a single swamp north of the cheese factory.

== Demographics ==
Historical population
Census	Pop.	Note	%±
1940	246		—
1950	225		−8.5%
1960	198		−12.0%
1970	207		4.5%
1980	323		56.0%
1990	366		13.3%
2000	427		16.7%
2010	488		14.3%
2020	482		−1.2%
U.S. Decennial Census

As of the census of 2000, there were 427 people, 119 households, and 106 families residing in the town. The population density was 126.8 inhabitants per square mile (49.0/km^{2}). There were 123 housing units at an average density of 36.5 per square mile (14.1/km^{2}). The racial makeup of the town was 93.91% White, 0.47% Asian, 0.23% Pacific Islander, 4.92% from other races, and 0.47% from two or more races. Hispanic or Latino of any race were 9.84% of the population.

There were 119 households, out of which 58.8% had children under 18 living with them, 81.5% were married couples living together, 4.2% had a female householder with no husband present, and 10.9% were non-families. 10.9% of all households were made up of individuals, and 5.0% had someone living alone who was 65 years of age or older. The average household size was 3.59, and the average family size was 3.87.

In the town, the population was spread out, with 39.8% under 18, 8.4% from 18 to 24, 30.9% from 25 to 44, 12.9% from 45 to 64, and 8.0% who were 65 years of age or older. The median age was 27 years. For every 100 females, there were 93.2 males. For every 100 females aged 18 and over, there were 104.0 males.

The median income for a household in the town was $42,143, and the median income for a family was $44,375. Males had a median income of $37,500 versus $21,607 for females. The per capita income for the town was $14,106. About 7.5% of families and 9.2% of the population were below the poverty line, including 12.3% of those under age 18 and 5.0% of those aged 65 or over.

== See also ==
- List of municipalities in Utah
