= Harold Simmons =

American businessman and philanthropist

- Born: Harold Clark Simmons; May 13, 1931; Golden, Texas
- Died: December 28, 2013 (aged 82); Dallas, Texas
- Education: University of Texas at Austin
- Occupations: Owner of Contran Corporation and Valhi, Inc.
- Spouse(s): Normagene Fairchild (divorced); Sandra Saliba (divorced); Annette Caldwell (widow)
- Children: 6 Scheryle Patigian (with Fairchild); Lisa Simmons (with Fairchild); Andrea Swanson (with Saliba); Serena Connelly (with Saliba) and two step-daughters

Harold Clark Simmons (May 13, 1931 – December 29, 2013) was an American businessman, investor, and philanthropist whose banking expertise helped him develop the acquisition concept known as the leveraged buyout (LBO) to acquire various corporations. He was the owner of Contran Corporation and of Valhi, Inc., (a NYSE traded company about 90% controlled by Contran). As of 2006, he controlled five public companies traded on the New York Stock Exchange: NL Industries; Titanium Metals Corporation, the world's largest producer of titanium; Valhi, Inc., a multinational company with operations in the chemicals, component products, Waste Control Specialists (waste management), titanium metals industries; CompX International, manufacturer of ergonomic products, and Kronos Worldwide, leading producer and marketer of titanium dioxide.

== Early life and education ==
Simmons was born in Golden, Wood County, Texas, the son of Reuben Leon (1894–1954) and Fairess Clark Simmons (1903–1990). His parents were Baptists and both worked as teachers. His father later became a school superintendent. Simmons earned BA (1951) and MA (1952) degrees in economics from the University of Texas at Austin. Simmons held a Phi Beta Kappa key.

== Career ==
After completing graduate school in 1952, Simmons worked for the U.S. government as a bank examiner, then for a Dallas-based bank, Republic National Bank.

In 1960, using $5,000 of his savings, and a $95,000 loan, he bought a small drugstore, University Pharmacy on Hillcrest Avenue, across from the campus of Southern Methodist University. Before Simmons owned it, University Pharmacy was the site of a racially charged sit-in in January 1961, when its owner C.K. Bright sprayed insecticide over and around 60 students, only two of whom were black seminary students. Simmons purchased the store and parlayed it into a chain of 100 stores, which in 1973 he sold for more than $50 million, to Eckerd Corporation. This launched his career as an investor when he used the proceeds of that sale to begin speculation in the financial services industry. By 1974, he had been indicted for and acquitted of wire and mail fraud, and involved in a pension-related lawsuit brought against him by the United Auto Workers.

Simmons developed his "all debt and no equity" philosophy of capital management from having observed banks as a bank examiner, realizing that "Small banks in Texas were casual about getting the maximum use of their funds. . . banks were the most highly leveraged thing I saw. They borrowed most of their money and really didn't need much equity except for purposes of public confidence." Understanding that banks could be bought entirely with borrowed money, Simmons theorized that he should "buy a bunch, because one bank could be used to finance another. All debt and no equity."

Simmons conducted a widely publicized but unsuccessful takeover attempt on the Lockheed Corporation, after having gradually acquired almost 20 per cent of its stock. Lockheed was attractive to Simmons because one of its primary investors was the California Public Employees' Retirement System (CalPERS), the pension fund of the state of California. At the time, the New York Times said, "Much of Mr. Simmons's interest in Lockheed is believed to stem from its pension plan, which is over financed by more than $1.4 billion. Analysts said he might want to liquidate the plan and pay out the excess funds to shareholders, including himself." Citing the "mismanagement" of its chairman, Daniel M. Tellep, Simmons stated a wish to replace its board with a slate of his own choosing, since he was the largest investor. His board nominations included former Texas Senator John Tower, the onetime chairman of the Armed Services Committee, and Admiral Elmo Zumwalt Jr., a former Chief of Naval Operations. Simmons had first begun accumulating Lockheed stock in early 1989 when deep Pentagon cuts to the defense budget had driven down prices of military contractor stocks, and analysts had not believed he would attempt the takeover since he was also at the time pursuing control of Georgia Gulf.

In 1997, Simmons made a $5 million investment in T. Boone Pickens, Jr.'s first fund BP Capital Energy Commodity Fund; by 2005 this had grown to $150 million.

== Capital gains tax opposition and activism ==
In August 1997, President Bill Clinton used a line-item veto to draw attention to the type of "special benefits" that investors such as Simmons employ to avoid paying capital gains taxes since the early 1980s. Simmons had formed the "Snake River Sugar Cooperative" of 2,000 beet farmers and classified it as a joint-venture, shared ownership co-op, to purchase his Amalgamated Sugar Company, for $260 million. At the time, Charles Schumer, serving as a representative from New York, wrote a letter to Clinton stating that the measure before him for consideration would benefit Simmons with a $104 million tax deferral. Simmons stated at the time that his tax deferral was only $80 million.

== Political activism ==
=== 1980s ===
During the Reagan presidency, Simmons was a contributor to GOPAC. Simmons also contributed to the defense funds of Oliver North and John Poindexter, Reagan aides implicated in the Iran-Contra scandal.

=== 1990s ===
In 1993, Simmons was fined $19,000 by the Federal Election Commission for exceeding the legal limit of campaign contributions in 1989 and 1990 elections.

Between 1993 and 1997, Simmons and family members and Contran gave more than $315,000 to Republican candidates, according to FEC records.

=== 2004 presidential election ===
During the 2004 presidential campaign Simmons made a $4 million donation to the group Swift Vets and POWs for Truth. He also donated $100,000 to George W. Bush's January 2005 inaugural ball.

=== 2008 presidential election ===
Simmons, a longtime Republican donor, gave the maximum $2,300 contributions to Senator John McCain, as well as to fellow Republican candidates Mitt Romney and Rudy Giuliani. He was listed as a "bundler" for the McCain campaign on McCain's website, which meant that he had raised between $50,000 and $100,000 for the Republican candidate. He also contributed to Representative Chet Edwards, a Texas Democrat. Simmons has given more than $500,000 to Texas Governor Rick Perry, and more than $300,000 to Texas Lieutenant Governor David Dewhurst and Attorney General Greg Abbott. He was a major donor to the American Issues Project, an independent conservative political group that ran ads critical of Democratic presidential candidate Barack Obama.

=== 2010 midterm elections ===
Two of Harold Simmons' companies – Southwest Louisiana Land which he owns and Dixie Rice Agricultural Corp in which he was a major investor – were each $1 million donors to the American Crossroads, a 527 organization working to elect primarily Republican legislators during the 2010 midterm elections.

=== 2011 illegal campaign contributions ===
In 2012, Simmons was fined by the Texas Ethics Commission for illegal campaign contributions to Texas state legislators in 2011. Simmons had channeled his contributions (to fifteen Republicans and three Democrats) through a political action committee (PAC), but he was the PAC's sole donor. The fine, in the amount of $6,450, was criticized as "meager" by Texans for Public Justice, the nonprofit organization that filed the complaint.

=== 2012 presidential election ===
Simmons's company, Contran Corporation, donated $1 million to Make Us Great Again, a super PAC supporting Rick Perry's 2012 presidential candidacy. That donation was the single largest received by the PAC in the fourth quarter of 2011. According to a CBS article, Contran also was the largest donor to American Crossroads, giving $2 million to the conservative super PAC co-founded by Karl Rove. Later data from Opensecrets.org shows Contran contributions of $5 million in Nov 2011, $5 million in Jan 2012, and $1 million in April 2012 to American Crossroads. Simmons also donated $100,000 directly to another Perry super PAC, the Restoring Prosperity Fund, before donating $5 million to American Crossroads in addition to Contran's donation. He has also contributed to Restore our Future, a super PAC supporting Mitt Romney. His contributions in support of Romney totaled $16.5 million, making him the year's third-largest Republican donor, behind Sheldon Adelson and Bob J. Perry.

As of March, Simmons and Contran Corp. had given almost $18 million to conservative super PACs, the election's second single contributor after Sheldon Adelson, spread among all the major Republican candidates following the advice of Rove. Simmons said, "Any of these Republicans would make a better president than that socialist, Obama. Obama is the most dangerous American alive ... because he would eliminate free enterprise in this country."

== Environmental management ==
NL Industries, originally named National Lead Industries, Inc. has been involved in numerous lawsuits brought by the U.S. Department of Justice to force the company to pay funds into the Superfund to clean up contaminated sites at various sites around the country such as Granite City, Illinois, and Depew, New York.

== Philanthropy ==
In 1973, Simmons was a significant contributor to the Dallas Civic Opera.

Harold Simmons was a former board member of the Cox School of Business at Southern Methodist University. He has given $1.8 million to establish the Simmons Distinguished Professorship in Marketing, and $1.2 million for the President's Scholars Program.

The Harold Simmons Foundation is the philanthropic arm of the Simmons financial empire. Two of Simmons' daughters, Serena Simmons Connelly and Lisa Simmons Epstein, are its administrators. The foundation supports the causes of immigration rights, campaign reform, prison reform, handgun control, and reproductive rights. The contributions to the presidential bids of Hillary Clinton and Barack Obama made by Serena Simmons Connelly were privately made, not funded by the foundation.

Simmons donated money to help fund the Hobby-Eberly Telescope Dark Energy Experiment at the University of Texas. He has previously given to UT athletic programs and the McCombs School of Business. By 2005, total donations from his family and foundation to the UT Southwestern Medical Center at Dallas exceeded $70 million.

In 2006, Simmons pledged $1 million to the George W. Bush Presidential Library contingent upon its being located at SMU.

In 2006, Harold Simmons made a grant to the Young America's Foundation to establish the Harold Simmons Lecture Series, which enabled former U.S. Senator Zell Miller to tour college campuses during the 2006–2007 school year to promote "his message in defense of America from foreign and domestic threats to our freedom."

Since mid-2006, Simmons has given funds to a chronic kidney disease research team led by Dr. Kamyar Kalantar-Zadeh to examine predictors of longevity in chronic kidney disease. Subsequently, the "Harold Simmons Center for Chronic Disease Research and Epidemiology" was created, first in "Los Angeles Biomedical Research Institute" at "Harbor-UCLA Medical Center" then in UC Irvine Medical Center at University of California, Irvine School of Medicine, in Orange, CA, which has published a large number of scientific reports and articles.

In 2007, Oprah Winfrey announced that Harold and Annette Simmons, her neighbors in Montecito, California, had contributed $5 million to her Oprah Winfrey Leadership Academy for Girls in South Africa.

In 2007, Harold and Annette Simmons announced a $20 million gift to Southern Methodist University to provide an endowment for the university's School of Education and Human Development. The gift allocated $10 million for construction of a new facility, to be named the Annette Caldwell Simmons Building; $5 million for graduate student fellowships; and $5 million for faculty support and an endowed deanship.

In 2008 the Harold Simmons Foundation made a donation of $5 million to the Dallas Zoo, the largest single private contribution in the zoo's 120-year history.

Annette and Harold Simmons have been underwriters for 28 consecutive years to the Dallas Crystal Charity Ball Fashion Show and Luncheon. The Crystal Charity Ball has distributed more than $82 million to children's charities since 1953.

The Harold Simmons Foundation is a major donor of over $500,000 to the Dallas Women's Foundation which commissioned a study of women's economic security in the 12-county Dallas-Arlington-Fort Worth metropolitan area.

The Harold Simmons Foundation issued a $50 million challenge grant to the Parkland Memorial Hospital Foundation, to aid in fundraising to build a new public hospital, one of the largest private gifts for a public hospital campaign in the nation.

The Harold Simmons Foundation made a gift to the Legal Hospice of Texas, a nonprofit law firm providing compassionate legal services at no charge to low-income individuals who are terminally ill, in 2010 and 2012.

== Personal life ==
Simmons has been married three times:

- His first wife, Normagene Fairchild, divorced him in 1959, leaving him with custody of their two daughters:
  - Scheryle Simmons Patigian (born 1953)
  - Lisa Simmons Epstein (born 1956)
- His second wife was Sandra K. Saliba. Sandra would later become Braniff Airlines first female pilot. They divorced in 1980. They had two children:
  - Andrea Leigh Simmons Swanson (born 1965)
  - Serena Sha Simmons Connelly (born 1970)
- In June 1980, he married his third and last wife, Annette Caldwell Fleck (born 1936), an interior designer with two children from a previous marriage. She is a native of Tyler, Texas and a graduate of Southern Methodist University. After graduating, she taught second and third grade in Dallas and at Clark Field, a U.S. air base in the Philippines. In October 2004, Mrs. Simmons was featured on the Oprah! television show, giving a tour of Simmons' boyhood town, Golden, Texas, during its sweet potato festival. In another episode, "Annette's Tea Party," Mrs. Simmons entertainment style was a feature.

=== Death and Taxes ===
Simmons died on the night of Saturday December 28, 2013, following eight days in the intensive care unit of the Baylor University Medical Center at Dallas. His Bloomberg obituary described him as a "Texas Corporate Raider" and his net worth was reported as $10 billion.

The following summer, financial journalist Matt Levine published a story "that I find rather wonderful" reporting on how the beneficiaries of Simmons' estate were able to reduce their liability for estate tax by about $1.1 billion by legally manipulating the price of the Valhi, Inc. shares owned by him. On June 11, the charitable foundation controlled by Simmons' heirs filed with the SEC a plan to sell all of its 2.5 million shares - because Simmons owned 94% of the company and it was consequently illiquid and thinly traded, this constituted a fire sale of Valhi's stock; the Foundation sold more of the company's shares in 2 weeks than had been traded in the entire previous 6 months, driving down the share price from about $14.91 in December to $6.01 when the estate had to make a tax declaration of the value of its Valhi holding. Additionally, the company's board, also controlled by the family, reduced the company's dividend, making it less attractive to investors. The fall in share price reduced the value of the estate's holdings by $2.8 billion and its estate-tax liability by $1.1 billion. Because the estate sold no stock, Simmons' beneficiaries retained the same ownership share of the company - it was a paper loss. A copy of the article was found in the Epstein files, emailed to Epstein by a lawyer at Paul, Weiss, Rifkind, Wharton & Garrison LLP.
