= Henry Arthur Benning =

Vice president and general manager of the Amalgamated Sugar Company

Henry Arthur Benning (August 8, 1879, in Lyons (town), New York – April 14, 1962) was the vice president and general manager of the Amalgamated Sugar Company.

== Personal life ==
Benning was born in Lyons, New York on August 8, 1879. Henry and his family lived on a farm near Lyons for his early life. He graduated from Lyons High School, then attended the Rochester Business Institute to become a court reporter.

Benning was about 5'6" and 160 pounds, and "had a marked inferiority complex such as that usually associated with men of small physical stature."

=== Stroke and death ===
Benning suffered a major stroke on March 8, 1956. He died on April 14, 1962.

== Early career ==
After completing the course, Benning was employed at the American Tobacco Company as a stenographer for the sales department of the chewing tobacco division. He was a "rotten stenographer", and became a salesman. Benning was a poor salesman, because he didn't use tobacco.

=== Sugar beet factories ===
Benning worked for a Lyons beet sugar factory that was built in 1900, working during construction and for the first several production campaigns.

In 1905, Benning left to work on the construction of a sugar beet factory being built in Glendale, Arizona. He was a beet end foreman for the first production campaign, then left for the Great Western Sugar Company in Fort Collins, Colorado. He worked at the Fort Collins factory for several years, then became superintendent of the Great Western factory in Sterling, Colorado in 1911. He went on to the Holly Sugar Corporation factory in Colorado Springs, Colorado, then to the Holly factory in Huntington Beach, California.

In 1920, Benning joined the Amalgamated Sugar Company, serving as Idaho District Manager, Assistant General Manager, then General Superintendent by 1923. He left due to "personal differences" with E. S. Rolapp, and rejoined the General Offices of Holly Sugar in Colorado Springs, then supervised their Torrington, Wyoming factory in 1928, "gleefully" battling with Great Western for sugar beet acreage in the Torrington area. In 1929, Benning left Holly Sugar to reorganize the American Beet Sugar Company in Denver, Colorado, becoming vice president and general manager. Immediately after joining American Beet Sugar, they acquired Amalgamated Sugar, so Benning was also vice president and general manager of Amalgamated Sugar.
