= Gregory J. Goff =

American businessman

- Education: University of Utah (B.S., M.B.A.
- Board member of: ExxonMobil Corp., 2021

Gregory J. Goff ("Greg") is an American businessman the president and chief executive officer of Andeavor, formerly Tesoro, where he has been since May 2010. As of May 2021 he was elected to the board of ExxonMobil; notably, he is one of the first pro-climate board members of the Big Oil company.

== Education ==
Goff graduated from the University of Utah with a BS degree in 1978. He graduated with an MBA from the University of Utah in 1981.

== Career at Tesoro and Andeavor ==
Goff became the president and chief executive officer of Tesoro Corporation in May 2010. He became the chairman and chief executive officer of Tesoro Logistics in April 2011.

== Board memberships ==
Goff is on a number of boards. In May 2021, Goff was elected to the board of ExxonMobil.
