= George S. Eccles =

American businessman (1900–1982)

- Born: 1900; Logan, Utah, U.S.
- Died: 1982 (aged 81–82)
- Education: Columbia Business School
- Known for: First Security Corporation
- Spouse: Dolores "Lolie" Doré Eccles

George S. Eccles (1900–1982), the sixth of nine children of Utah industrialist David Eccles and his wife Ellen Stoddard Eccles. He grew up in Logan, Utah and graduated from Columbia University in New York, where he met fellow student Dolores "Lolie" Doré, whom he wed in 1925. George and his brother Marriner Stoddard Eccles founded First Security Corporation in 1928. He was CEO of First Security Corporation from 1945 to 1982. In 1960 he and his wife co-founded the George S. and Dolores Doré Eccles Foundation. He received the Golden Plate Award of the American Academy of Achievement, alongside his brother Marriner S. Eccles, at the 1972 Achievement Summit in Salt Lake City.
