= Oregon Lumber Company =

Defunct lumber company of Oregon

- Industry: Wood processing
- Founded: 1889
- Founder: Charles W. Nibley; David Eccles; George E. Stoddard
- Defunct: 1917
- Fate: Rebranded to Oregon-American Lumber Company
- Successor: Oregon-American Lumber Company; Oregon-American Lumber Corporation

The Oregon Lumber Company was a company west of Portland, Oregon, that claimed extensive land via the Homestead Act of 1862. The company was formed by Charles W. Nibley together with David Eccles and George Stoddard in 1889. The company had its principal holdings near Baker City, Oregon, and in the Sumpter Valley, with others near Hood River area, and around Chenoweth. It also owned a number of associated railroad companies constructed primarily to haul its timber.

According to Hugh Nibley (Charles W Nibley's grandson), much of the rain forest west of Portland was acquired by the company using illegal claims under the Homestead Act. It was part of the large group of business enterprises controlled by Nibley, who was to become presiding bishop of the Church of Jesus Christ of Latter-day Saints from 1907 to 1925.

The company became the Oregon-American Lumber Company in 1917, with headquarters in Vernonia, Oregon. Eccles gradually became the predominant owner. The company underwent multiple amalgamations and changes of ownership and was dissolved in 1957.
