= First Security Corporation =

- Company type: Public
- Traded as: Nasdaq: FSCO
- Industry: Banking
- Founded: June 1929; 97 years ago in Ogden, Utah, US
- Founders: Marriner Stoddard Eccles, George S. Eccles
- Defunct: 2000; 26 years ago
- Fate: acquired by Wells Fargo
- Successor: Wells Fargo
- Headquarters: Salt Lake City, Utah, United States
- Area served: Western United States
- Key people: George S. Eccles, CEO
- Products: Retail banking Investment banking Commercial banking Mortgages
- Website: Archived official website at the Wayback Machine (archived December 5, 1998)

First Security Corporation was a multistate bank holding company in the western United States, primarily in Utah, Idaho, New Mexico, Oregon, Nevada, and Wyoming. Headquartered in Salt Lake City, Utah, First Security merged with Wells Fargo in 2000.

== History ==
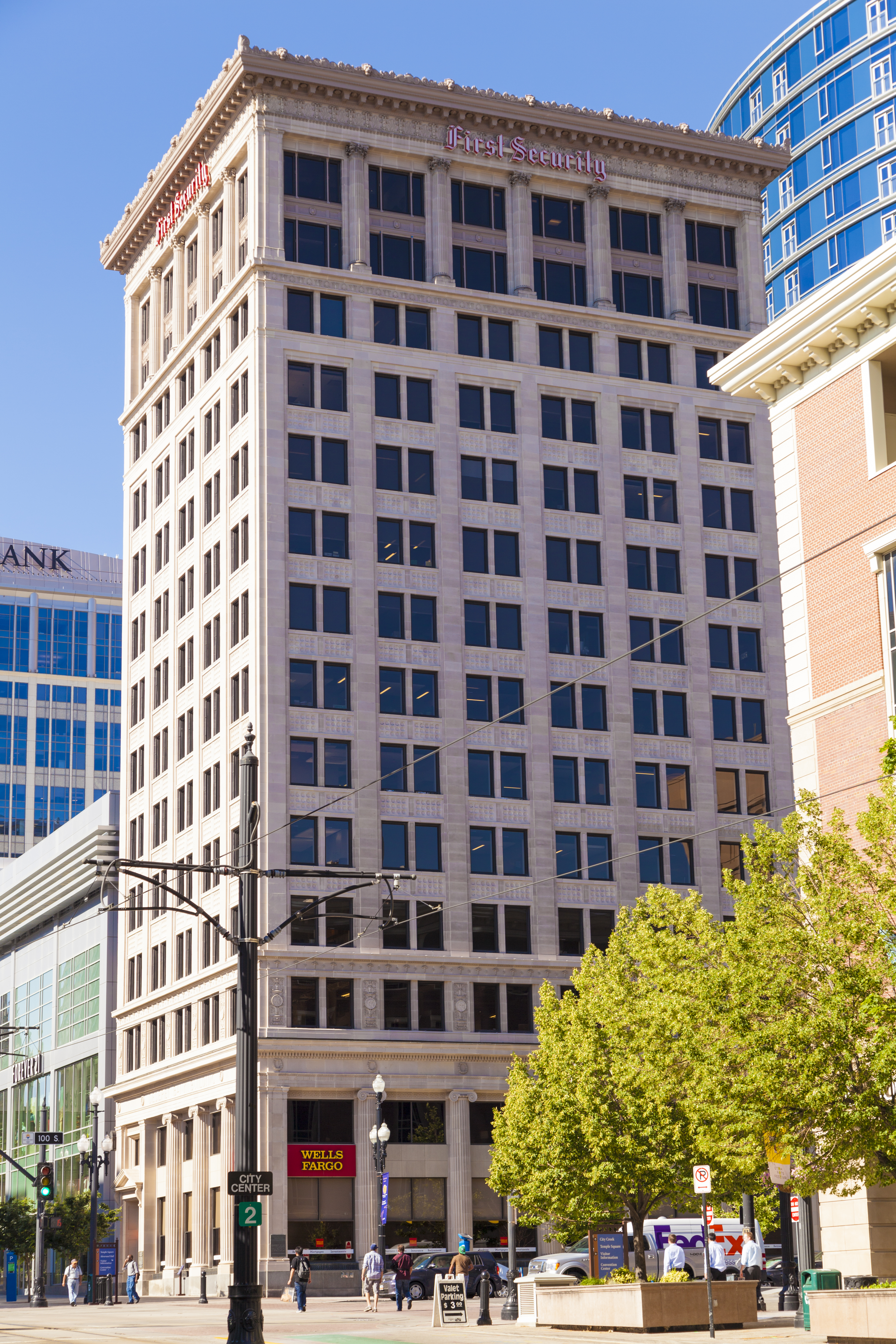
The former First Security Building, now the Deseret Building, still retains the former bank's name.

David Eccles who emigrated to Utah from Scotland in 1863 had a founding interest in Utah International, which was later inherited by Marriner and George Eccles. The two sons, together with Marriner A. Browning, expanded their financial interests to 17 banks and a building and loan company, later brought under one holding company, First Security Corporation, in June 1928.

In 1932, First Security acquired Deseret National Bank, which had been founded in 1871 by Brigham Young. It then moved its headquarters from Ogden to Salt Lake City.

In 2000, First Security was absorbed into Wells Fargo. First Security stockholders received 0.355 of a share of Wells Fargo common stock in exchange for each share of First Security common stock.

== See also ==
- First Security Bank Building, home of the company's headquarters for several decades
