= George S. and Dolores Doré Eccles Foundation =

- Founded: 1960
- Founder: George S. Eccles, Dolores Dore Eccles
- Purpose: Arts and culture, community, education, health care, and preservation and conservation.
- Location: Salt Lake City, Utah
- Region served: Utah
- Method: Grantmaking
- Key people: George S. Eccles, Spencer Eccles
- Website: George S. Eccles Foundation

The George S. and Dolores Doré Eccles Foundation is a non-profit foundation located in Salt Lake City, Utah that gives grants for projects and programs throughout Utah in the following areas: arts and culture, community, education, health care, and preservation and conservation.

== History ==
The foundation was founded in 1960 by George S. Eccles and his wife Dolores Doré Eccles. Following the death of George S. in 1982, the Foundation became more active. By 2017, it had awarded more than $600 million to various organizations around the state of Utah.

In 2021, KPCW renamed its studios the Spencer F. Eccles Broadcast Center following a $400,000 grant from the foundation. The project allowed KPCW to expand its broadcast facilities.

== Grant recipients ==
=== Arts and culture ===
- Utah Shakespearean Festival
- Ballet West

=== Community ===
- Boy Scouts of America
- Salvation Army
- United Way of Utah County

=== Education ===
- Brigham Young University
- Snow College
- Southern Utah University
- University of Utah
  - Natural History Museum of Utah at the University of Utah
  - University of Utah College of Engineering
  - University of Utah School of Medicine
- Utah State University
- Utah Tech University
- Utah Valley University
- Park City School District

=== Healthcare ===
- American Red Cross
- Intermountain Health Care
- Moran Eye Center
- University of Utah

=== Preservation and conservation ===
- Tracy Aviary in Liberty Park
- Preservation Utah
- Red Butte Garden and Arboretum
- This Is The Place Heritage Park
