= David Eccles (businessman) =

American businessman and industrialist (1849–1912)

David Eccles Sr
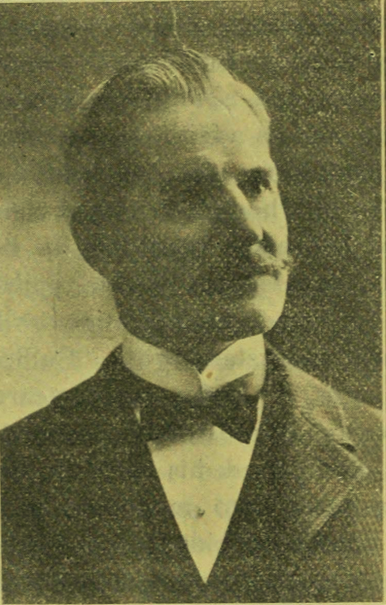
- Born: May 12, 1849; Paisley, Scotland
- Died: December 6, 1912 (aged 63); Salt Lake City, Utah, U.S.
- Known for: Oregon Lumber Company; Utah Construction Company; Amalgamated Sugar Company; Utah Electric Company; Union Pacific Railroad; Sumpter Valley Railway; Mount Hood Railroad
- Spouses: Bertha Marie Jensen (m. 1875): Ellen Stoddard
- Children: Marriner Stoddard Eccles; George S. Eccles

David Eccles Sr (May 12, 1849 – December 6, 1912) was an American businessman and industrialist who founded many businesses throughout the western United States and became Utah's first multimillionaire.

== Biography ==
Eccles was born in Paisley, Scotland, to William and Sarah Hutchinson Eccles. In 1863 his family moved from Glasgow to the United States of America, sailing on the Cynosure and eventually settling in Ogden Valley, located in eastern Weber County, Utah. The move was made because of their joining the Church of Jesus Christ of Latter-day Saints and their desire to be near the body of the church. He lived in both Eden and Liberty, Utah.

After struggling to make a living, the family moved to Oregon City, Oregon. There they worked in a new mill. He worked for the mill for a year, then for a lumber corporation, and the Oregon and California Railroad. The family moved back to Ogden, Utah, in 1869 after the completion of the Transcontinental Railroad hoping it would bring them work.

In the Ogden area, he worked cutting wood and building homes. He worked as a freighter and for the Union Pacific coal mines. He also worked at a sawmill at Monte Cristo east of Ogden.

In 1874, he attended Louis F. Moench's school in Ogden. It was there he met Bertha Marie Jensen and married her in 1875. They had 12 children from the marriage.

While he had been working he saved up a considerable amount of money and put it to other uses. He started the Eccles Lumber Company and several other enterprises. Through supplying ties for railroads, he knew the local circumstances of where the railroads were building and the opportunities available. He opened lumber mills, shingle mills, planing mills, an electric plant, and other entities. He followed the railroads and opened mills in other locations in Oregon and Washington states. He and his associates built the Sumpter Valley and Mount Hood railroads. It was through these and other railroads that Eccles shipped the lumber and other goods to Utah.

Eccles met Ellen Stoddard, the daughter of his partner, John Stoddard. Under the practice of polygamy at the time, David married Ellen, and they made their home in Logan, Utah where he built a lavish yellow brick mansion for his new bride using lumber imported from his corporation in Oregon. (The home is on West Center Street.) Marriner Stoddard Eccles and George S. Eccles are children of this marriage.

A hard worker, Eccles was reported to have traveled over 44,000 miles (71,000 km) in 1904. While friends encouraged him to slow down, he preferred to "die in the harness." One of his hallmarks was integrity and self-reliance. His companies prospered on his no-debt plan and view of achieving success rather than money.

David utilized his children for child labor. They worked along with the crews on the railroads, mills, and lumber yards, and were taught many aspects of the businesses. Several served missions for The Church of Jesus Christ of Latter-day Saints. His children graduated from University of Michigan Law School, Columbia University, Brigham Young College, Utah State University, and University of Utah.

With the estimated $4–7 million he made, mostly from his Oregon enterprises, he invested heavily in Utah. He purchased stock in banks, canneries, insurance companies, railroads, factories, mills, mines, and various other companies. The Utah Construction Company built over 700 miles (1,100 km) of track for the Western Pacific Railroad and led the Six Companies in constructing the Hoover Dam. David Eccles served as the second president of Utah Construction Company after the death of long-term associate Thomas Dee. He also served as founder of a number of companies, one of which was the Amalgamated Sugar Company.

Eccles served on the Ogden City Council and as their mayor from 1888 to 1890. He was known for his aid to The Church of Jesus Christ of Latter-day Saints for lending large amounts of money to it at no interest. At the time of his death, he was the president of 16 industrial corporations and 7 banks. He also was serving as a director in 24 other banks and industries. He is Utah's first multimillionaire.

While running to catch the evening train from Salt Lake City to Ogden, Utah, he died of a heart attack in Salt Lake City on December 6, 1912, at the age of 63.

There are a host of organizations named after Eccles and his descendants. The David Eccles School of Business is at the University of Utah. The David Eccles Conference Center is in downtown Ogden, Utah

== Descendants ==
- Marriner Stoddard Eccles – son of David Eccles, was a US banker, economist, and Chairman of the Federal Reserve. The Eccles Building that houses the headquarters of the Federal Reserve in Washington, D.C. is named after him.
- George S. Eccles – son of David Eccles, founder and CEO of the First Security Corporation and founder of the George S. and Dolores Dore Eccles Foundation
- David Christian Eccles
- Emma Eccles Jones – daughter of David Eccles, noted philanthropist and pioneer in early childhood education. Both Utah State University and Southern Utah University have an Emma Eccles Jones Education Building.
- Spencer Eccles – grandson of David Eccles, a prominent financier and philanthropist in Salt Lake City, Utah
