= Amalgamated Sugar Company =

American sugar beet–refining company

- Industry: food and tobacco industry
- Predecessor: Logan Sugar Company; Ogden Sugar Company
- Founded: December 6, 1897; 128 years ago in Ogden, Utah, United States
- Founder: David Eccles
- Headquarters: Boise, Idaho, United States
- Products: Sugar
- Website: www.amalgamatedsugar.com

The Amalgamated Sugar Company is an American sugar beet–refining company run on a cooperative basis. It was founded in 1897 in Ogden, Utah, and is now located in Nampa, Idaho. The company markets its sugar under the White Satin brand.

== Founding ==
Presidents of The Amalgamated Sugar Company
Years	Name
1897–?	David Eccles
1904–1910	Charles W. Nibley
1910–1913	David Eccles
1913–1914	Henry H. Rolapp (resigned)
1916–1921	Anthon H. Lund (died in office)
1921	M. S. Browning
1921–1927	Henry H. Rolapp
1927–1929	Anthony W. Ivins (American Beet)
1929–1931	Henry Arthur Benning (diverged from American Beet)
1931–1934	Anthony W. Ivins (died in office)
1936–?	M. S. Eccles
1984?–?	Harold Simmons

=== Ogden Sugar Company ===
The Ogden Sugar Company was incorporated on December 6, 1897, at the Weber Club in Ogden, Utah. Directors included David Eccles, Thomas Duncombe Dee, George Q. Cannon, and John R. Winder, with Eccles as president and Dee as vice president. One of the first motions was to ask senators Frank J. Cannon and Joseph L. Rawlins and representative William H. King to oppose the Annexation of Hawaii into the United States.

Eccles and Joseph Clark inspected a sugar beet factory in Los Alamitos, California, and contracted with the E. H. Dyer Construction Company of Cleveland, Ohio, to build a sugar beet factory in Ogden.

Ogden Sugar began with a plant built in Ogden, Utah, in 1898. It was based on the success of the Utah Sugar Company's Lehi, Utah, plant, built in 1891 and successful by 1897. The first annual report to Ogden Sugar stockholders was made March 16, 1899, and "was a forerunner of subsequent annual reports made in equally depressing language... the beginning of lamentations by David Eccles." Eccles began reporting factory depreciation in 1900, and Eccles also reported the competition from Utah Sugar caused the market to be entirely saturated, so they began marketing outside of the region.

=== Logan Sugar Company ===
On December 5, 1901, the Logan Sugar Company was founded by David Eccles, William Eccles, Thomas Dee, George Stoddard, Charles W. Nibley (presiding bishop of the LDS Church). The factory was apparently built by 1902.

=== Consolidation ===
The Ogden Sugar and Logan Sugar companies were consolidated on July 3, 1902, becoming known as the Amalgamated Sugar Company. Four days later, Eccles offered to sell his Oregon Sugar Company to Amalgamated Sugar, which was accepted by the other directors of Amalgamated. Unusually, a stockholders meeting was set for five years in the future (March 1907); more unusually, no stockholders showed were at the 1907 meeting.

On January 2, 1903, the first report from Amalgamated Sugar indicated the company processed 97119 tons of sugar beets into 10626 tons of sugar during 1902. This was approximately 25% more than the previous year. Sugar was sold in ten states, primarily Utah, Idaho, Wyoming, and Montana. As with previous years, sugar beet production in Oregon was poor, at least partly due to the lack of irrigation.

=== Lewiston Sugar Company ===
On June 2, 1903, Charles Nibley and others incorporated the Lewiston Sugar Company. Directors included Charles Nibley, William Lewis, Abraham O. Woodruff, Rudger Clawson, William B. Preston, and Joseph Howell, with Charles Nibley as president, Lewis as vice president, and Charles W. Nibley Jr. as secretary. In late 1903, due to difficulties financing a factory, the Lewiston Sugar Company was sold. Henry Osborne Havemyer's American Sugar Refinery Company (also known as the Sugar Trust) purchased 50% of the stock, Amalgamated Sugar purchased 25% of the stock, and Eccles kept 25%. The Lewiston factory was built in 1905 by Dyer's construction company.

=== American Sugar ===
American Sugar purchased 50% of Amalgamated Sugar in 1903, as well as Lewiston Sugar, as already mentioned. This brought changes of the fiscal year for accounting, as well as CPA audits beginning in 1907.

=== Sugar beet blight ===
The sugar beet blight drastically affected the Ogden and Logan area plants in 1905.

=== Ogden Sugar expansion ===
A large crop in 1909, combined with low capacity of the Ogden factory, caused 31,000 tons of sugar beets to be shipped to the Logan and Lewiston plants at great expense. To avoid this in the future, daily capacity was increased from 350 to 550 tons.

== 1910s ==
While Charles W. Nibley had been the president since 1904 and David Eccles as general manager, Eccles was actually operating the company. Eccles was elected president in 1910 with Nibley as vice president, which was the start of a rift between Eccles and Nibley.

Company records, stored at the Utah Loan and Trust Building in Ogden, were destroyed in a fire on November 11, 1911, except for some records stored elsewhere in a fireproof vault.

25,358 tons of sugar were produced from 207,022 tons of sugar beets in 1911. This was the first time the company had produced over 25,000 tons of sugar (or 500,000 hundredweight bags).

As the Minidoka Irrigation Project of Idaho was nearing completion in 1912, Amalgamated Sugar was deciding whether to place the failed La Grande, Oregon, factory near Rupert or Burley. Burley was selected in late 1911, and the factory was operating by October 21, 1912. The location was chosen partly due to farmer land commitments and connection by the Oregon Short Line Railroad Company. The first year of the Burley factory had a higher production than any of the previous fourteen years in La Grande.

Henry H. Rolapp was elected president of Amalgamated Sugar in March 1913. Charles W. Nibley purchased American Sugar's stakes in Amalgamated Sugar and Lewiston Sugar in 1913, due to pressure on American Sugar by the federal government due to antitrust. From late 1912 when David Eccles died until 1918, his sons L. R. Eccles and David C. Eccles had controlled Amalgamated and Lewiston poorly, enforcing policies that were counterproductive and forcing Henry H. Rolapp to resign as president in 1914, only a year after he assumed office. Acting as General Manager in 1918, Eccles brought in an outside financial auditors, who was to have a "short and stormy career with the company." L. R. Eccles resigned on September 8, 1918, due to "mismanagement of company affairs". Bachman stated that L. R. Eccles could have continued being a promising operations director, but handled the business side poorly.

Lewiston Sugar and Amalgamated Sugar merged in 1914, keeping the Amalgamated name. Joseph F. Smith was named director and president of the new corporation, but resigned in April 1915. Anthon H. Lund became president, at the urging of Charles Nibley.

The Church of Jesus Christ of Latter-day Saints purchased a large portion of Amalgamated in 1914, then sold it in 1929.

In 1915, a lawsuit was threatened by the United States District Attorney in Salt Lake City for antitrust reasons, citing the Sherman Antitrust Act of 1890 and the Clayton Antitrust Act of 1914. Around the same time the Federal Trade Commission sued the company, which was settled in 1921.

In 1915, an investment in the Layton Sugar Company was made (despite L. R. Eccles). Amalgamated Sugar tried unsuccessfully to buy the company a few years later.

Sugar sales from 1916 to 1920 were handled by Stephen A. Love, who was also the sales manager of the Utah-Idaho Sugar Company.

In 1918, Amalgamated processed 529,722 tons of sugar beets into 56,166.85 tons of sugar, the first time the company produced over a million hundredweight pounds of sugar. Amalgamated showed a net loss for the fiscal year, the first time since the company had founded that they lost money. This was due to a decrease in sugar content of the beets, and a large increase in the cost to extract sugar. By 1918, the company had eight factories, located in Utah (Ogden, Logan, Lewiston, Brigham City, Smithfield) and Idaho (Burley, Twin Falls, Paul). These factories had a combined capacity of 5100 tons.

Through a transaction of the David Eccles Company, the largest stockholder, Amalgamated became a large shareholder in Ernest R. Wooley's West Cache Sugar Company in 1919. David Eccles, elected General Manager in September 1918, resigned in August 1919, in part due to the declining profits and lack of dividend payouts. As part of additional financing brought in by the Bankers Trust Company of New York, four managers from the Great Western Sugar Company were brought into executive positions.

=== Amalga, Utah ===
Because of ongoing disputes between L. R. Eccles and Charles Nibley, the David Eccles Company organized the Eccles Sugar Company around 1916. They signed buying contracts with farmers, and intended to build a factory near Trenton, Utah. In response, Amalgamated Sugar had Dyer Construction Company build a factory at Amalga, Utah (at 41.971548°N 111.82815°W) by in 1917, and built an 11 miles (18 km) railroad spur (at a cost of $400,000) to the Ogden, Logan and Idaho Railway. The railroad was purchased by Amalgamated Sugar around 1946. The community of Amalga was named for the factory.

=== Twin Falls, Idaho ===
A factory in Twin Falls, Idaho, eventually located at 42.532572°N 114.433969°W, was discussed on August 6, 1915. The Twin Falls factory construction contract was awarded to Larrowe Construction Company of Toledo, Ohio.

=== Paul, Idaho ===
A plant near Rupert, Idaho, was proposed in 1916, and a location in Paul, Idaho, was chosen by August 1916. The factory was built by Larrowe Construction in 1916 and began operating on October 28, 1917. The factory is located at 42.612715°N 113.758857°W.

=== Brigham City, Utah ===
A factory in Brigham City, Utah, built by Dyer in 1916 for Utah-Idaho, was purchased in 1917. Farmlands were irrigated by the Hammond Canal Company, which was also owned by Utah-Idaho, so Amalgamated purchased the canal company also. The factory and canal company was sold back to Utah-Idaho in 1920.

=== Pacific Sugar Corporation ===
Amalgamated purchased the California-based Pacific Sugar Corporation in 1917. Pacific Sugar owned lands near Tracy, California, and was building a factory in the area. This was a poor financial move for the company, having repercussions as early as 1918.

=== Whitehall, Montana ===
Amalgamated formed the Jefferson Valley Sugar Company, then contracted with Larrowe Construction to build a factory at Whitehall, Montana, near Butte in 1917. The pledged lands from farmers was withdrawn or "were not to be found", leading to financial troubles for both Jefferson Valley Sugar and Amalgamated Sugar. The factory construction was halted, and the remaining sugar beet production was sold to Great Western Sugar Company and transported to their Billings factory. The partial factory was sold to Utah-Idaho in 1920.

=== World War I ===
During World War I, sugar beet seed, normally sourced from Europe, was difficult to acquire. Joseph Quinney Jr., the manager of the Logan and Lewiston factories, purchased 3 years' supply of sugar beet seed for the Amalgamated and Utah-Idaho Sugar companies for a cost of $500,000, about three times higher than it would normally cost. Amalgamated began producing seed during this time.

Prices paid to farmers for sugar beets was increased by $1.25, to $7.00 per ton, in 1917. This was done to match the price increases by Utah-Idaho Sugar.

== 1920s ==
In 1920, Horace Havemeyer strongly rebuked Amalgamated for their involvement with the Oneida Irrigation District and the Pacific Sugar Company, both in a directors' meeting and by letter to the executive committee. Havemeyer encouraged Amalgamated to spend their energy at the Ogden, Lewiston, and Twin Falls factories.

Amalgamated purchased the Cornish, Utah, factory of the West Cache Sugar Company for $1.2 million on October 1, 1920.

In January 1921, the Board of Directors ousted the management put in place by the Bankers Trust Company. However, by September 1921, the company was in dire financial straits. All directors and officers were required to resign, which they did on November 5, 1921. Directors resigning included Edmund Orson Wattis Jr. and Fred G. Taylor. Some directors were asked to stay, including M. S. Browning, M. S. Eccles, Stephen L. Richards, and Horace Havemeyer. Henry Rolapp was elected president and general manager. After this occurred, the only person associated with David Eccles was Henry H. Rolapp, who had been forced to resign in 1914.

The 1921 fiscal year ended up with a loss of almost $4.5 million. In 1922, losses for the year were only about $650,000, significantly less than the year before. 1923 saw profits of almost $2.4 million.

In 1924, the Franklin County Sugar Company asked Amalgamated to purchase the company. Amalgamated declined, but purchased their Preston, Idaho, factory around 1960. Also in 1924, plants in Cornish and Twin falls were closed.

In 1926, a factory in the Missoula, Montana, area was planned. This was in large part due to excess equipment at shuttered factories and the heavy blight that was having a large effect on sugar production. The Missoula factory was built in 1928, using equipment removed from the Cornish factory. Amalgamated also acquired the Hooper factory and the Interstate Sugar Company in 1927.

While it was intended Henry H. Rolapp would remain in control through 1931 due to the Bankers Trust Company obligations of 1921, Rolapp resigned in late 1926. His resignation was accepted in early 1927. This was due to the large voting block controlled by the David Eccles Company and others who aligned with the Eccles Company.

Another large ownership and management shakeup occurred in 1929, with the David Eccles Company ownership being transferred to the American Beet Sugar Company. American Beet then owned 96% of the common stock in Amalgamated Sugar, and J. M. Eccles resigned from Amalgamated. The Eccles company and family influence over Amalgamated was then eliminated. The general office of Amalgamated, located in Ogden, was closed, with many employees being eliminated. The general office became American Beet's office in Denver.

== 1930s ==
Because of blight and drought, many factories were closed for several years over the 1930s. For instance, only four factories operated in 1931.

During The Great Depression, the Beet Growers Credit Corporation was organized, backed by the Federal Intermediate Credit Bank and Federal Farm Marketing Administration. Persistence of H. A. Benning resulted in separation of Amalgamated Sugar from American Beet Sugar on June 15, 1932, and the general office in Ogden was re-staffed. 1932 saw a new production record, with 603,615 tons of beets produced into 97,928 tons of sugar, nearly 2 million hundredweight bags.

In 1933, the Smithfield, Utah, factory was permanently closed, then moved beginning in 1934 to the Clarksburg, California, thanks to the Jones-Costigan Act. The factory began operation on July 31, 1935.

1934 was a difficult year, with only two factories, Lewiston and Missoula, in operation due to the blight. In 1935, while planted area was low, 12,373 acres (50.07 km^{2}) contracted in 1935, versus 21,389 acres (86.56 km^{2}) in 1934, the blight-resistant seed variety was used for the first time. Yields were drastically higher than previous years, and five of eight factories were operated.

The Paul factory, shuttered since 1926, was reopened and renovated in 1936. Also in that year, Amalgamated sold the Missoula and Clarksburg factories to American Crystal Sugar Company (the successor of the American Beet Sugar Company), leaving Amalgamated's six remaining factories in Utah and Idaho. Amalgamated also recapitalized, leading to a complete separation from American Crystal.

The company acquired the White Satin trademark on November 29, 1934, to use for marketing its sugar.

Experimentations with growing sugar beets near Nyssa, Oregon, conducted by Amalgamated's Idaho District Manager R. H. Tallman, had begun in 1935. Yields were very favorable, in part due to the Owyhee Irrigation Project, completed in 1932. This led to plans for a factory in 1937, made possible by a $2 million loan from the Bankers Trust Company. The factory was completed in 1938, with operation beginning on October 9, 1938. The factory was designed and built by Amalgamated Sugar, the first they had fully built, and had a radically different layout than other factories. The factory was located at 43.875298°N 116.990629°W, on both the Union Pacific Railroad lines and along U.S. Route 20.

In 1937, Amalgamated, Utah-Idaho, American Crystal, and Great Western formed the Western Seed Production Corporation was incorporated in Arizona to produce sugar beet seed. This was needed because European suppliers were impacted by the lead-up to World War II and were also uninterested in developing blight-resistant seed. The Logan factory, idle since 1926, was also dismantled during 1937.

Because of the successful sugar production in Nyssa, Amalgamated became interested in additional marketing in Washington and Oregon. Mailliard and Schmiedell were contracted in 1938 to promote White Satin in the two states, paying special attention to proclaiming it as "Oregon's Own and Only Sugar." An office was established in Portland, Oregon, in 1938.

In 1939, the company began selling wet beet pulp, a byproduct of manufacturing, as sheep and cattle feed. They sold it in the Twin Falls and Nyssa areas, feeding 8400 head of cattle and 15,000 head of sheep. A pulp drying operation was installed in 1941 at the Nyssa plant, allowing the pulp feed to be transported more easily.

== 1940s ==
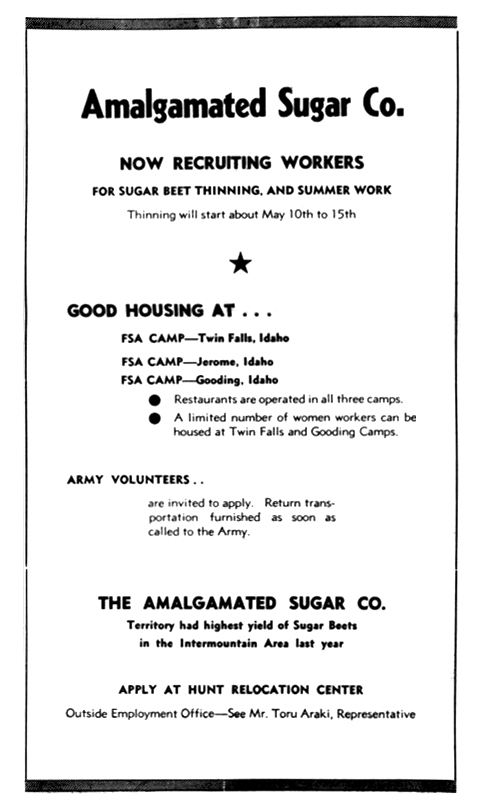
Employment recruitment ad published in the camp newspaper of Idaho's Minidoka War Relocation Center (May 1, 1943). An essential wartime commodity, sugar beets were processed and used in the manufacture of munitions and synthetic rubber. Japanese-American farm workers were in high demand in the western U.S.

Because of increased military activity near the Ogden factory reducing the area available for farming, the factory was recommended for removal in September 1941 to Isleton, California, to be operated by the Layton Sugar Company. Layton Sugar would use the White Satin brand bags for the completed sugar. Further investigation showed this would be a poor idea, so following an October 1941 decision, the factory was dismantled and moved to Nampa, Idaho, again processed by Layton Sugar. This operation was finally ready for operation by October 8, 1942.

By December 1941, the LDS Church holdings were sold to the Atlas Corporation of New York.

Because of labor shortages during the US involvement in World War II, Mexican nationals and Japanese evacuees were employed as field laborers.

The Burley factory was changed to a potato dehydration in 1943, and was ready for operation in 1944, operating on a government contract. It was converted back for the 1946 season, since the government contracts expired at the end of the war. After being closed in 1948, the factory, never having been modernized, was written off.

The Utah-Idaho Central Railroad Company, partially owned by Amalgamated, was turned over to Amalgamated during foreclosure proceedings in 1945. Amalgamated purchased much of the stock and mortgage bonds, then took over operation of the railroad. The postwar discontinuation of passenger service, and increased freight by truck, caused this operation to be closed and abandoned in late 1948.

=== White Satin/White Stag sign ===
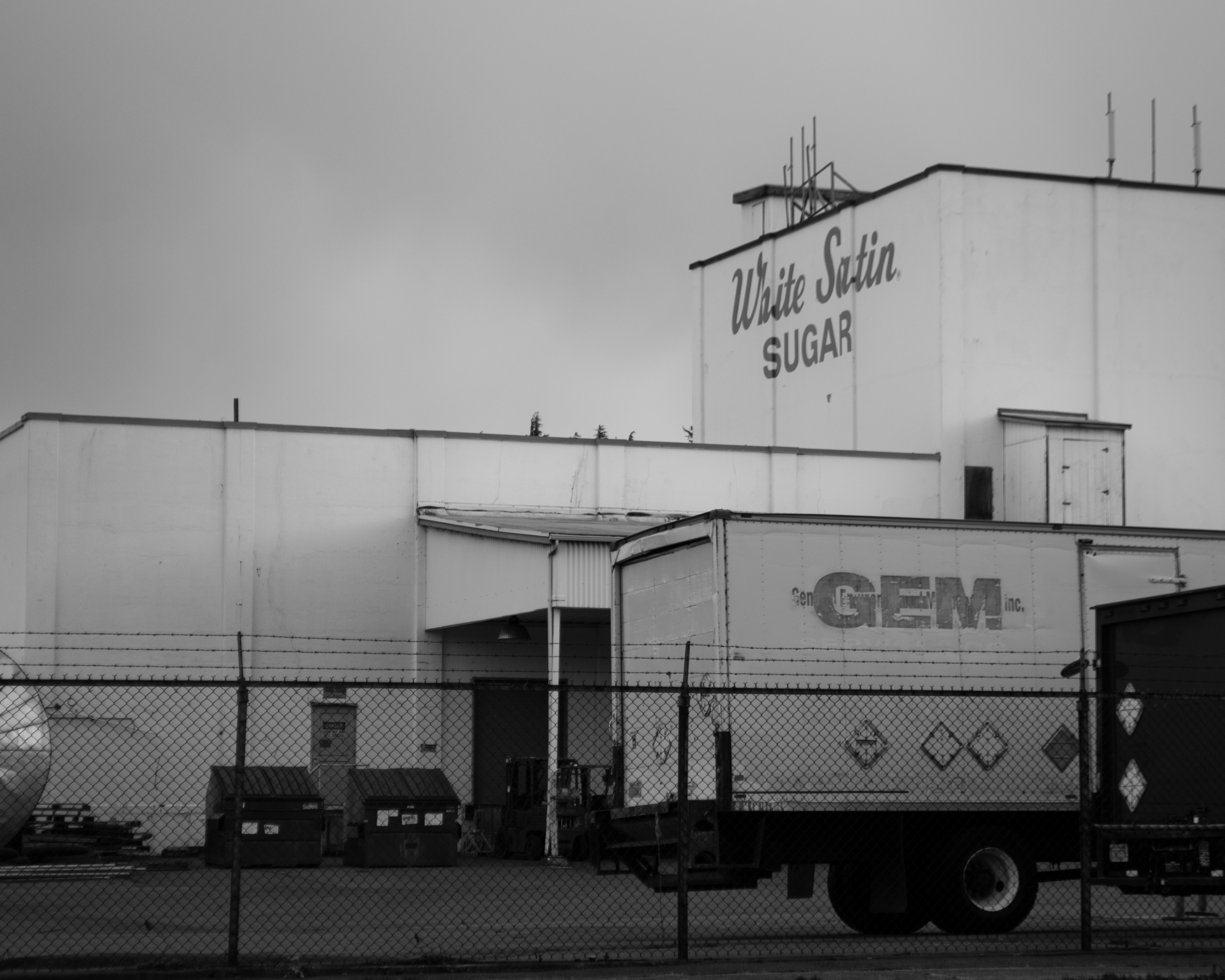
The White Satin Sugar warehouse in Seattle, Washington

In 1940, Amalgamated commissioned a large illuminated sign in downtown Portland, Oregon, to advertise its product. The sign featured an outline of Oregon and the words "White Satin Sugar", and was later animated with sequenced lighting. The sign, which was changed over the years to promote a sportswear company, a gift retailer, and ultimately, the city of Portland itself, became a registered historic landmark in Portland in 1977.

The Portland, Oregon, office, using bulk sugar storage built in Nampa, Idaho, supplied the California Packing Corporation factory in Vancouver, Washington, with bulk sugar. A distribution center for bulk and packaged sugar was also expanded in Seattle, Washington, in 1942. It was smaller than the Portland distribution center.

== 1950s ==
The company was listed on the New York Stock Exchange in 1950. A new Portland, Oregon, distribution center was also built in 1950, finished in 1951. It was much larger than the Seattle center; the distribution silo could hold 2500 tons of sugar and supply it as bulk, liquid, blend, or package sugar.

A large fire occurred at the dried pulp warehouse in the Nyssa, Oregon, factory on May 15, 1952. There were $100,000 in damages. The pulp dryer operation in Nyssa was expanded in 1955, doubling the pulp drying capacity and allowing all of the pulp to be dried, as it was under demand as animal feed. A beet seed development laboratory was also built in Nyssa in 1954. In 1958, Nyssa had a daily capacity of 4000 tons. An upgrade program was begun in 1959, increasing capacity to 6500 tons by 1961.

Because of lawsuits and pressure for the Nampa, Idaho, plant to discontinue dumping factory waste into Indian Creek and then Mason Creek, a $1 million pulp dryer was constructed in late 1955.

Bulk storage of sugar was also increased at the Nampa and Twin Falls factories in 1956.

== 1960s ==
Amalgamated purchased the Franklin County Sugar Company and its Whitney, Idaho, factory on August 31, 1960.

== 1970s ==
Amalgamated Sugar and its competitors (including Utah-Idaho Sugar) were sued beginning in 1971, alleging price fixing and market manipulation. One such class action lawsuit was settled out of court in 1980.

== 1980s ==
Amalgamated merged into LLC Corp on 3/10/1987 and the company then changed its name to Valhi Inc. Valhi is a holding company based in Dallas, Texas.

The company purchased Medford Corporation (known as Medco), a timber company based in Medford, Oregon, in 1984 for $110 million.

== 1990s ==
Union workers went on strike in 1990. In 1995, the Nyssa plant was Oregon's second-highest polluter of sulfur dioxide behind the Boardman Coal Plant. A man was crushed by a rail car of coal at the Nyssa plant in January 1997, resulting in an inspection and fine by Oregon Occupational Safety and Health Division.

The Snake River Sugar Company, formed in 1994, bought Amalgamated Sugar in 1997 for $250 million. Snake River Sugar Company is an Oregon-based farmer's cooperative. In 1990, Amalgamated Sugar was the second-largest sugar beet refiner in the United States. Snake River borrowed $180 million, including $100 million from Valhi, to complete the transaction.

The company was once run by investor Harold Simmons, who arranged the Snake River Sugar Company co-op and buyout. Simmons ran Amalgamated from before 1984, and through at least 1999. He also ran Valhi. Ralph C. Burton was president of the company in 2005.

== 2000s ==
Amalgamated closed the Nyssa factory in 2005. Approximately 190 permanent and 600 seasonal workers were employed at the Nyssa factory, processing 1,000,000 short tons (910,000 t) of sugar beets into 150,000 short tons (140,000 t) of processed sugar. The distribution center on North Columbia Boulevard in Portland, Oregon, on a rail line, is still operating.

As of 2009, there are factories in Nampa, Paul, and Twin Falls, Idaho. The Nampa factory processes about 1,500,000 short tons (1,400,000 t) of sugar beets, Paul processes 2,600,000 short tons (2,400,000 t), and Twin Falls processes 1,100,000 short tons (1,000,000 t).

== See also ==
- List of companies based in Idaho
