= Marriner S. Eccles =

American economist and banker (1890–1977)

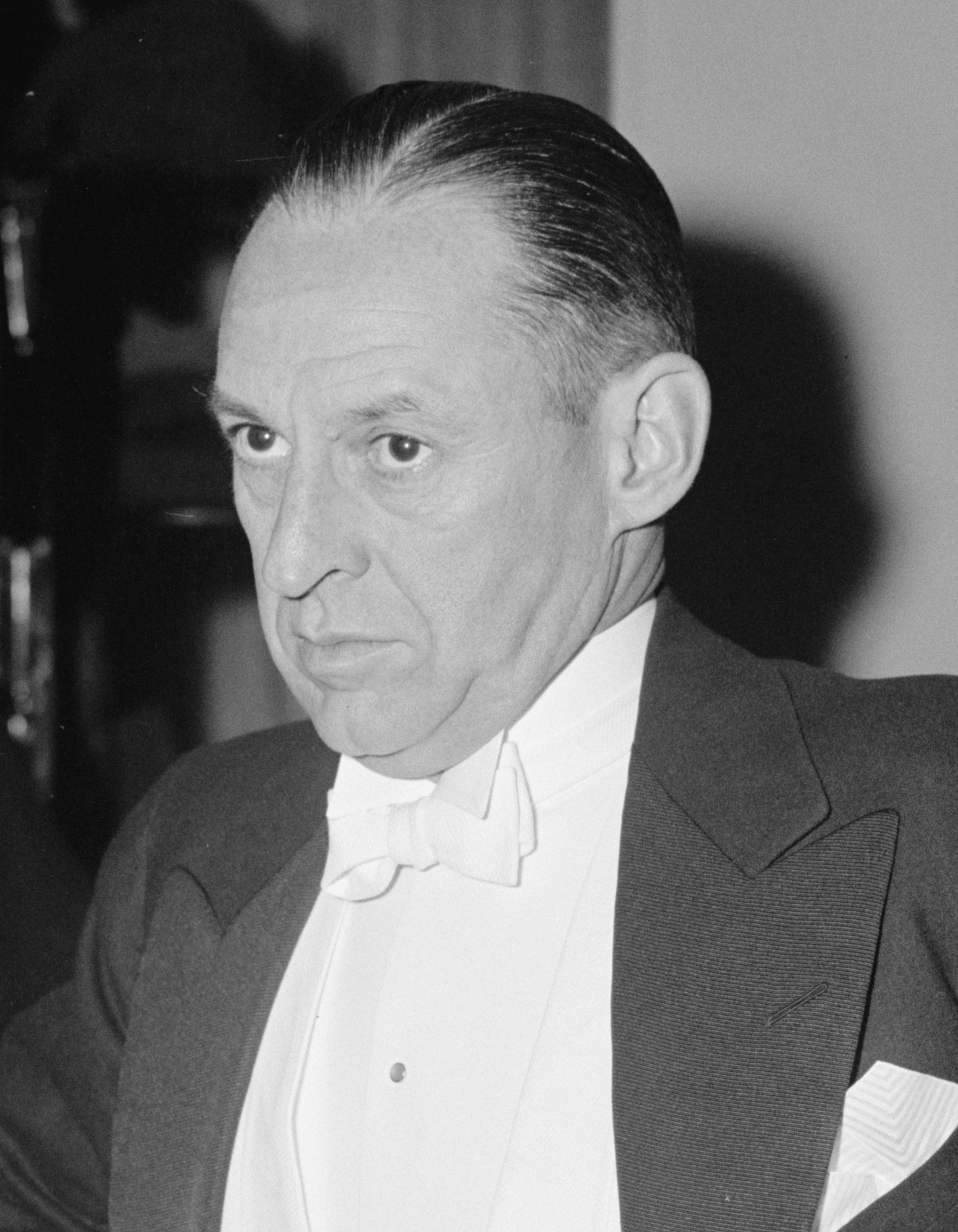
- Eccles in 1939

7th Chairman of the Federal Reserve
- In office November 15, 1934 – January 31, 1948
- President: Franklin D. Roosevelt; Harry S. Truman
- Deputy: John Thomas; Ronald Ransom
- Preceded by: Eugene Robert Black
- Succeeded by: Thomas B. McCabe

Member of the Federal Reserve Board of Governors
- In office November 15, 1934 – July 14, 1951
- President: Franklin D. Roosevelt; Harry S. Truman
- Preceded by: Eugene Robert Black
- Succeeded by: Abbot Mills

Personal details
- Born: Marriner Stoddard Eccles; September 9, 1890 Logan, Utah, U.S.
- Died: December 18, 1977 (aged 87) Salt Lake City, Utah, U.S.
- Party: Republican
- Spouse: May Campbell Young (m. 1913; div. 1948)

Marriner Stoddard Eccles (September 9, 1890 – December 18, 1977) was an American economist and banker who served as the 7th chairman of the Federal Reserve from 1934 to 1948. After his term as chairman, Eccles continued to serve as a member of the Federal Reserve Board of Governors until 1951.

Eccles was known during his lifetime chiefly as having been the Chairman of the Federal Reserve under President Franklin D. Roosevelt. He has been remembered for having anticipated and supporting the theories of John Maynard Keynes relative to "inadequate aggregate spending" in the economy which appeared during his tenure.

== Early life ==
Born in Logan, Utah to David and Ellen (Stoddard) Eccles, a Mormon polygamist family, on September 9, 1890. He was the eldest of the nine children by Ellen Stoddard, David Eccles' second wife. His family was extended by another twelve siblings from his father's first wife. Eccles was educated at the public schools of Baker, Oregon and attended Brigham Young College and served a Latter-day Saint mission to Scotland. After his mission, while working in a family enterprise in Blacksmith Fork Canyon, he learned of the untimely death of his father.

== Career ==
He was subsequently able to reorganize and consolidate the assets of his father's industrial conglomerate and banking network. Eccles expanded the banking interests into a large western chain of banks called Eccles-Browning Affiliated Banks. He was a millionaire by age 22. The company withstood several bank runs during the Great Depression and, as a leading banker, Eccles became involved with the creation of the Emergency Banking Act of 1933 and the Federal Deposit Insurance Corporation.

The Great Depression marked a turning point in Eccles's economic views. Drawing on his experience as a banker during the collapse, he came to believe that the Depression could not be corrected solely through private-sector thrift, wage reductions, or business investment. He argued that excessive concentration of income and wealth had weakened consumer purchasing power and contributed to overreliance on debt. Eccles consequently advocated federal deficit spending, public works, unemployment relief, and other measures intended to restore purchasing power and stimulate demand. He presented many of these ideas publicly before the publication of John Maynard Keynes's The General Theory of Employment, Interest and Money in 1936.

After a brief stint at the Treasury Department and with the support of treasury secretary Henry Morgenthau Jr., Eccles was appointed by President Roosevelt as the Chairman of the Federal Reserve. Eccles was reappointed chairman in 1936, 1940, and 1944 and served until 1948. In February 1944, Roosevelt appointed Eccles for another 14-year term on the board and Eccles stayed on the board until 1951, when he resigned a few months after the 1951 Accord. Eccles had also participated in post-World War II Bretton Woods negotiations that created the World Bank and International Monetary Fund.

Eccles retired to Utah in 1951 to run his companies and write his memoirs, entitled Beckoning Frontiers: Public and Personal Recollections. He mounted an unsuccessful campaign for the Utah Republican senatorial nomination against incumbent Arthur Watkins in 1952. He further consolidated industrial and family assets, finally organizing a series of foundations representing assets that he had managed for various family members. These foundations have served Utah and the Intermountain West in support of educational, artistic, humanitarian, and scientific activities. He died in Salt Lake City, Utah in 1977 and was entombed in the Larkin Sunset Lawn Mausoleum.

== Personal life ==
In 1913, he married the former May Campbell Young. The couple did not have a happy marriage, caused partly by Eccles' lack of attention towards her, and although they were legally married 35 years until their divorce in 1948, they separated soon after the marriage and lived largely separate lives. His grand-niece, Hope Eccles, is married to former Vice Chair of the Federal Reserve Randal Quarles.

== Legacy ==
Eccles was and is seen as an early proponent of demand stimulus projects to fend off the ravages of the Great Depression. Eccles was famously rebuked by Congresswoman Jessie Sumner (R, IL) during a House of Representatives hearing on the increasingly liberal policies of the Roosevelt administration and the Federal Reserve, when she said, "you just love socialism." He became known as a defender of Keynesian ideas, though his ideas predated Keynes' The General Theory of Employment, Interest, and Money (1936). In that respect, he is considered by some to have seen monetary policy having secondary importance and that as a result he allowed the Federal Reserve to be sublimated to the interests of the Treasury.

In this view, the Federal Reserve after 1935 acquired new instruments to command monetary policy, but it did not change its behavior significantly. Further, his defense of the Federal Reserve-Treasury accord in 1951 is sometimes seen as a reversal of his previous policy stances.

Marriner Eccles received the Golden Plate Award of the American Academy of Achievement, alongside his brother George S. Eccles, at the 1972 Achievement Summit in Salt Lake City. The Eccles Building that houses the headquarters of the Federal Reserve in Washington, D.C. was named after Eccles in 1982. The naming was a component of the Garn-St. Germain Depository Institutions Act lead-sponsored by Senator Jake Garn (R, UT) and Congressman Fernand St. Germain (D, RI).

Government offices
Preceded by Eugene Robert Black	Member of the Federal Reserve Board of Governors; 1934–1951	Succeeded by Abbot Mills
Preceded by Eugene Robert Black	Chairman of the Federal Reserve; 1934–1948	Succeeded by Thomas B. McCabe
