= Bernardinuscollege =

School in Heerlen, the Netherlands

Coordinates: 50.882059°N 5.984655°E

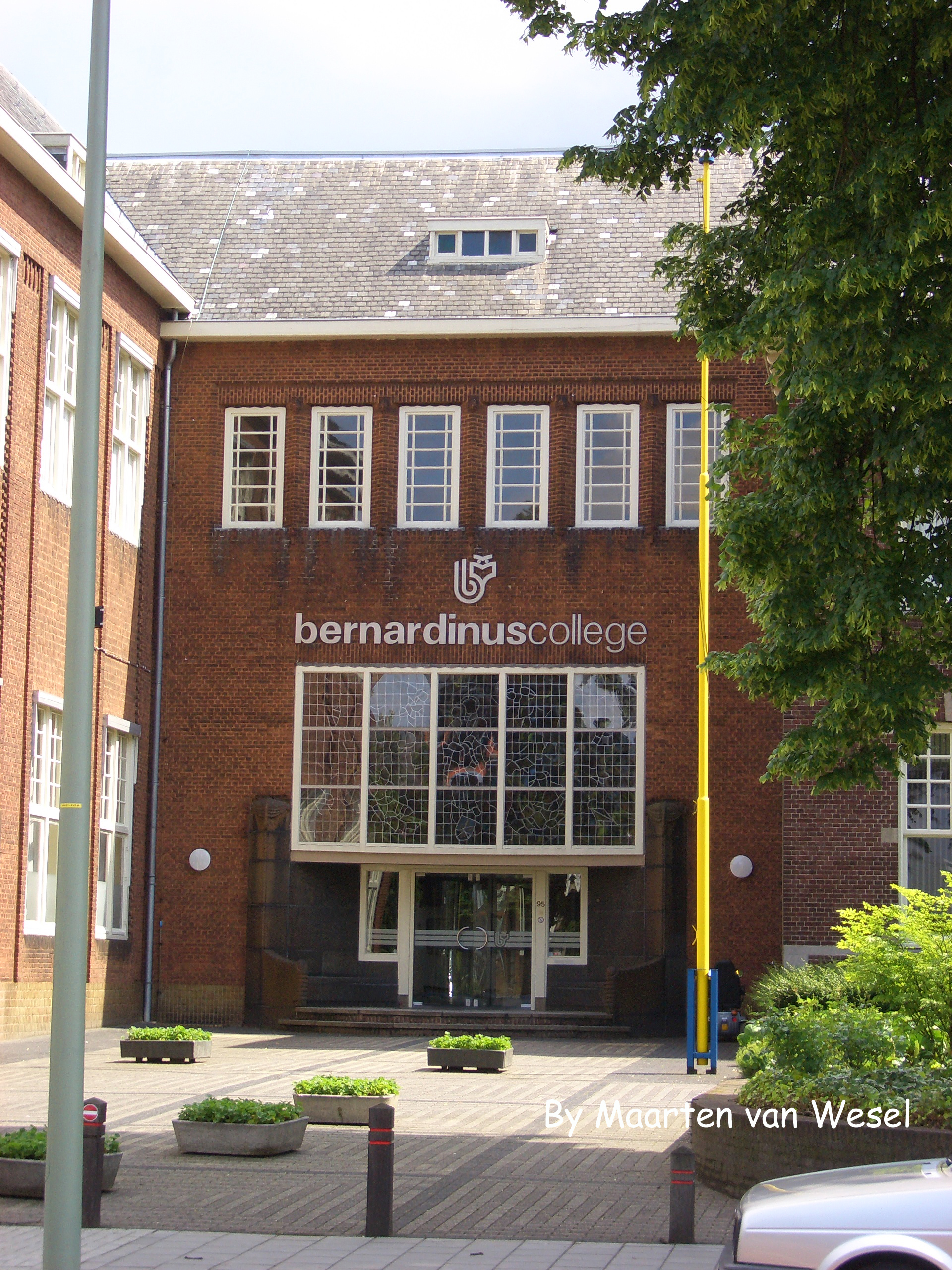
Bernardinuscollege main entrance

Bernardinuscollege is a school in Heerlen, the Netherlands. The school was founded by Franciscan friars in 1903 as a monastery, that was later converted to a Hogere Burgerschool, because of the need for education in the wake of the blooming mining industry. In September 1913 the first students arrived.

== History ==
Sint-Bernardinus was expanded with a midlevel-business school and in 1919 the 3-year HBS (Higher Citizen School) course was changed to a 5-year one. In 1930 the school was further expanded with a Gymnasium.

In 1970 the 'Sint' was dropped from the school name, giving it its current name: Bernardinuscollege.

Bernardinuscollege is part of SVOPL together with Charlemagne College, Herlecollege, Praktijkonderwijs Parkstad Limburg, and Sintermeertencollege.

In 2009, Bernardinuscollege did not accept any new vmbo-t students. From that moment on, only havo, atheneum and gymnasium students are accepted. In 2013, Bernardinuscollege launched the Technasium, a more technical oriented study, which adds the subject O&O ('Onderzoek en oriëntatie' - Research and orientation) to the profiles of Atheneum and Gymnasium students. In early 2014, Bernardinuscollege was certified as a Vecon Businessschool, which allows them to give out an extra certificate to students when they finish their Economy exams.

== Notable people ==
=== Alumni ===
- Hans Hoenjet (b. 1953), critic, journalist and writer
- Jan Hanlo (1912–1969), poet and author
- Jo Ritzen (b. 1945), Minister of Education
- Frans Timmermans (b. 1961), Minister of Foreign Affairs, First Vice-President of the European Commission
- Olaf Sleijpen (b. 1970), economist, academic, and central banker, president of De Nederlandsche Bank

=== Teachers ===
- Peter Winkels (1954–2021), writer and television presenter

== Gallery ==
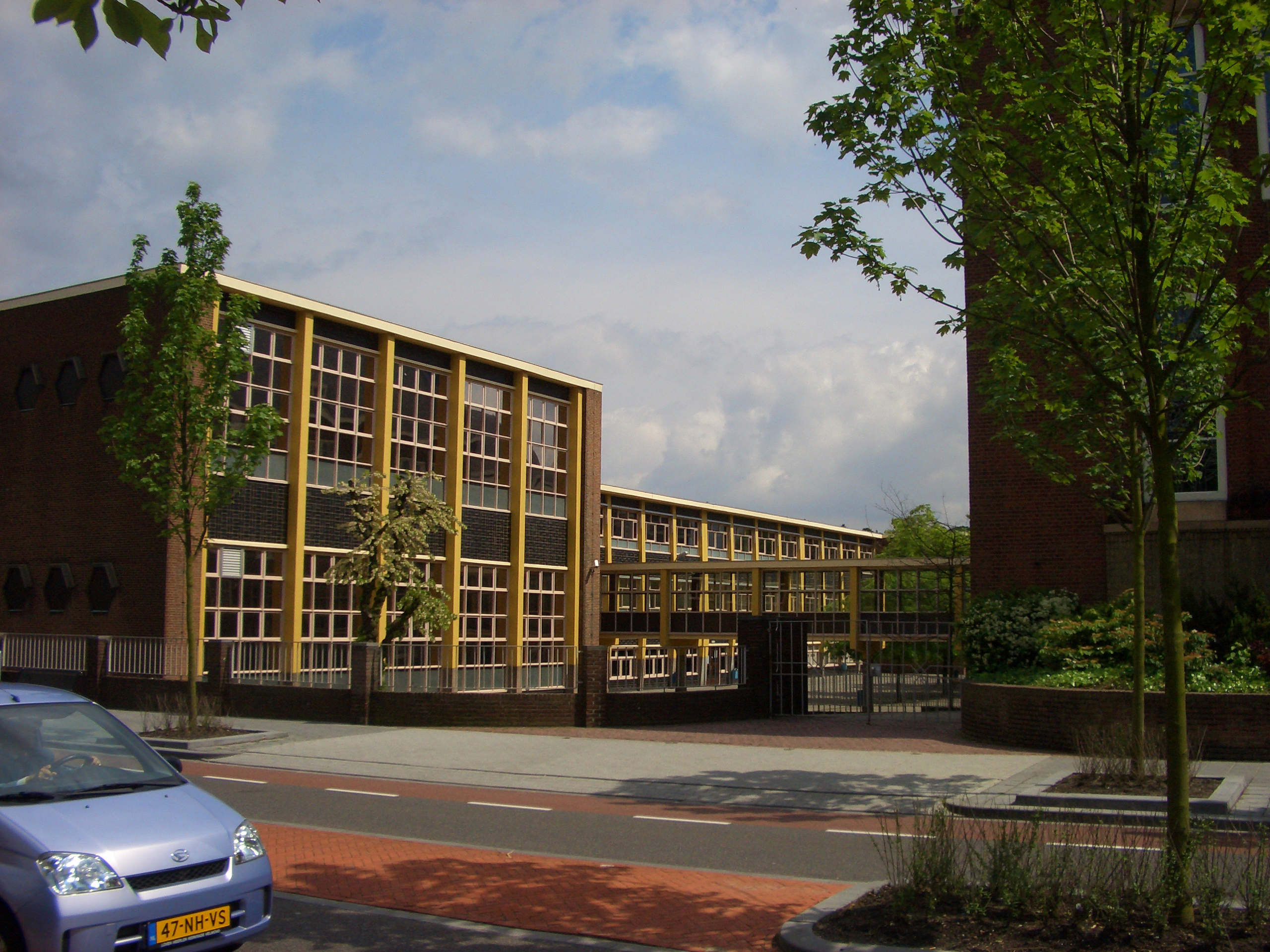
Bernardiuscollege later added building

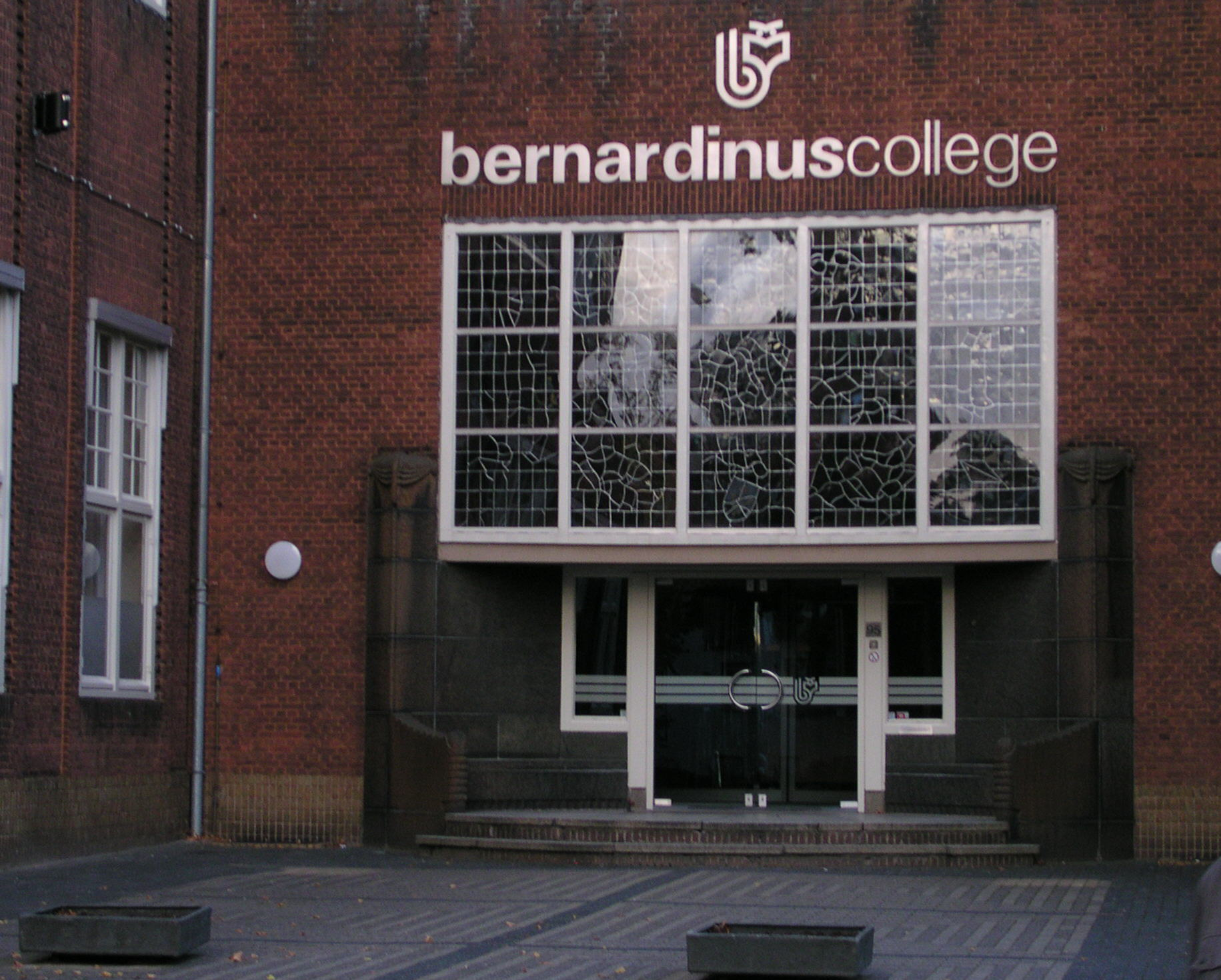
Main entrance

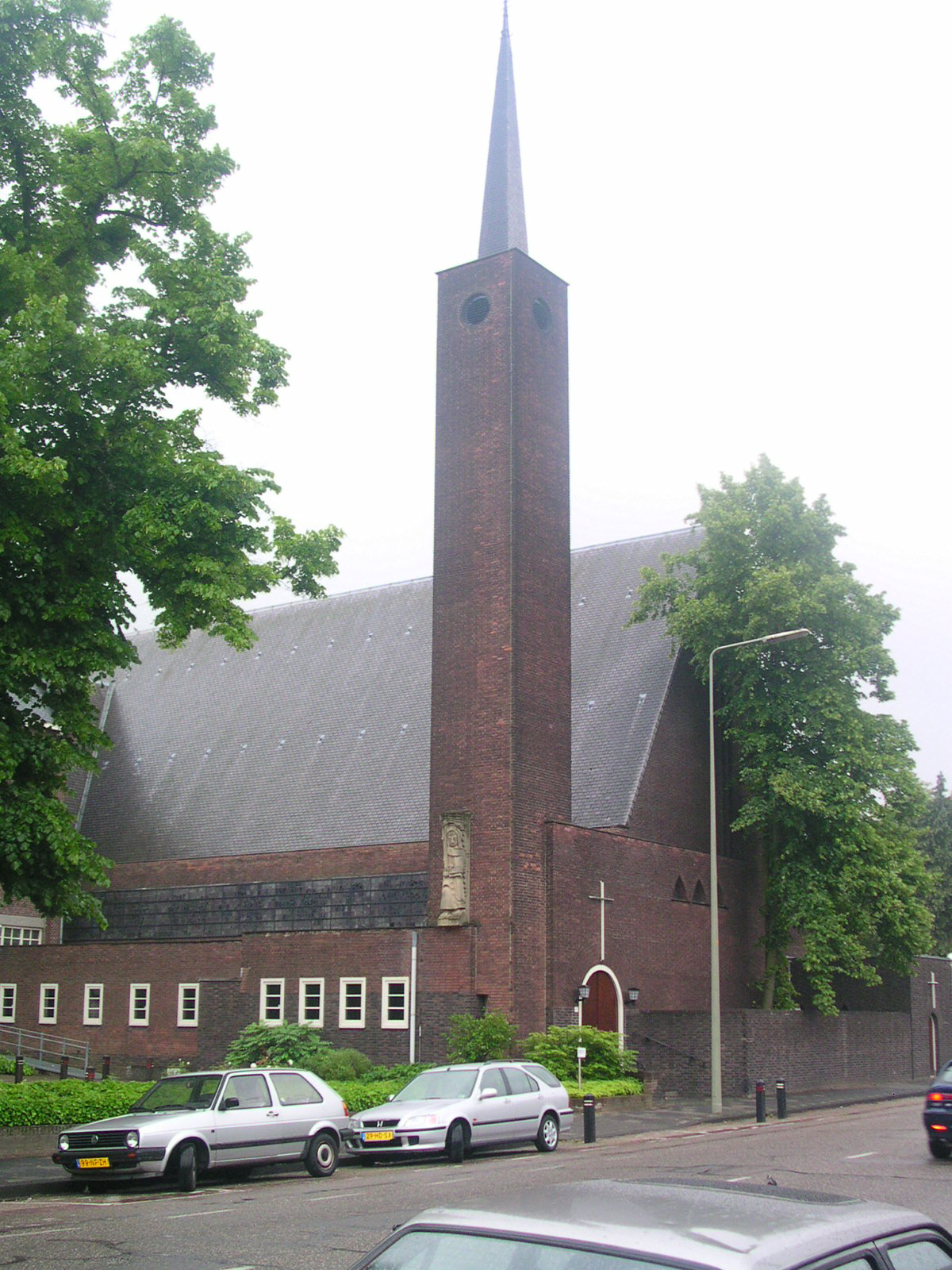
Bernardinuscollege Kapel

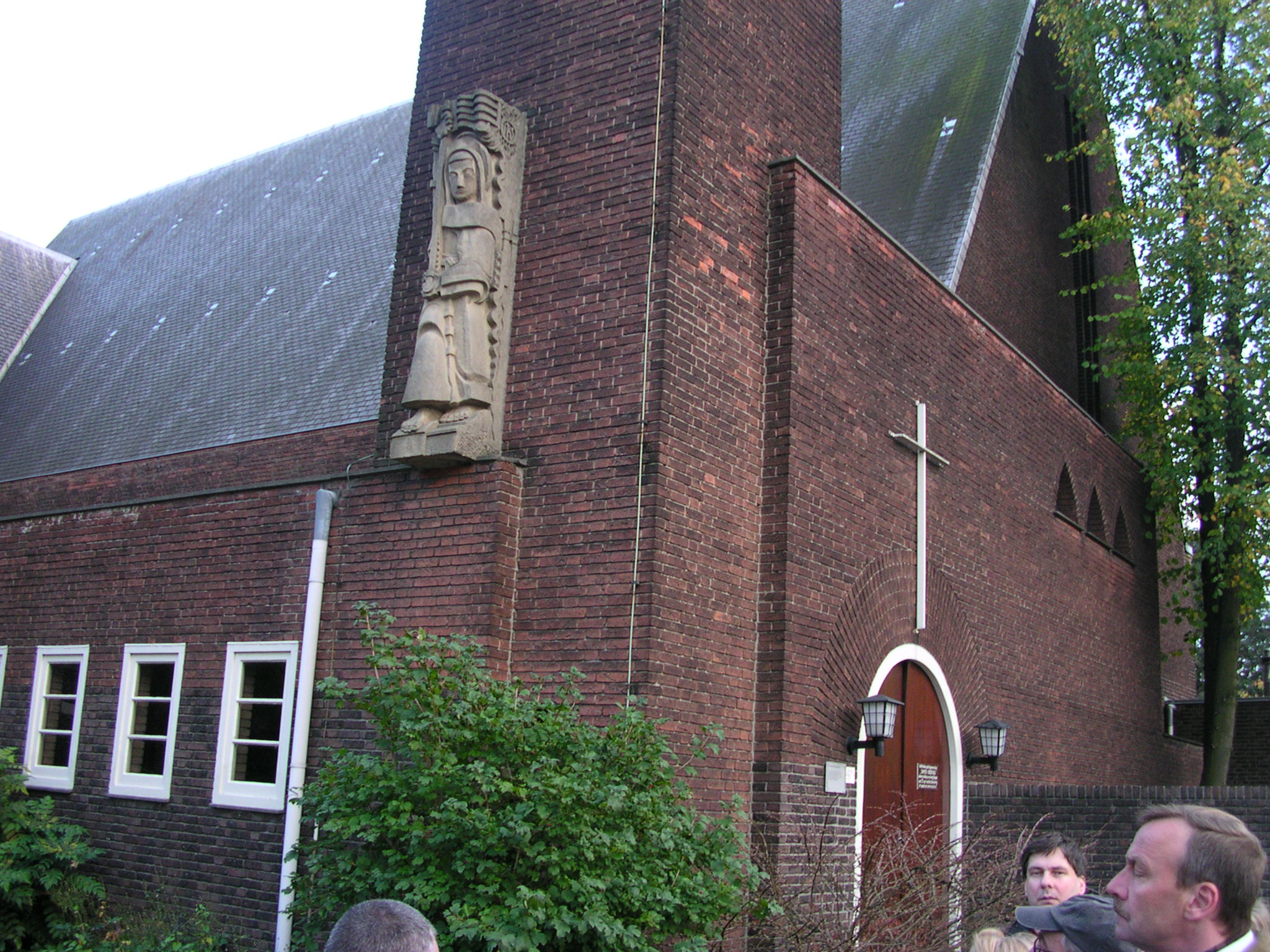
Bernardinuscollege Kapel
