= EEU =

EEU may refer to:

- Elior Evangelical University
- Empower European Universities, a Dutch think tank
- English Engineering Units
- Eurasian Economic Union
