= Klaas Knot =

Dutch economist and central banker (born 1967)

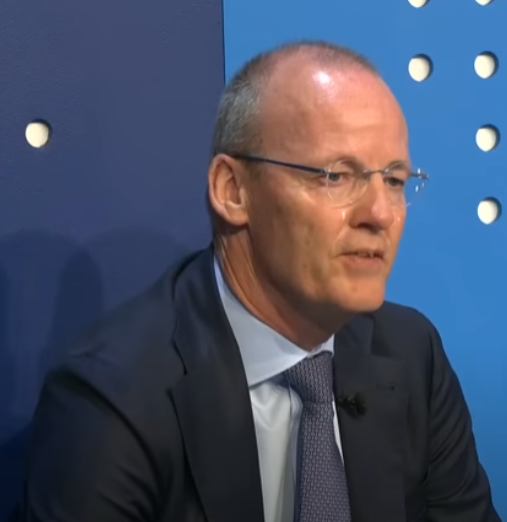
- Speaking at the 2022 World Economic Forum

Chair of the Financial Stability Board
- In office 2 December 2021 – 1 July 2025
- Preceded by: Randal Quarles
- Succeeded by: Andrew Bailey

President of De Nederlandsche Bank
- In office 1 July 2011 – 30 June 2025
- Preceded by: Nout Wellink
- Succeeded by: Olaf Sleijpen

Personal details
- Born: Klaas Henderikus Willem Knot; 14 April 1967 (age 59) Bedum, Netherlands
- Education: University of Groningen (PhD)

Klaas Henderikus Willem Knot (born 14 April 1967) is a Dutch economist and central banker who was president of the Dutch central bank De Nederlandsche Bank (DNB) from 2011 until 2025. In this capacity he served as a member of the Governing Council of the European Central Bank (ECB) and its General Council for 14 years making him one of the longest serving members, as well as of the Board of Governors of the International Monetary Fund (IMF), and the Board of Directors of the Bank for International Settlements. He served as Chair of the G20’s Financial Stability Board from 2 December 2021 to 1 July 2025.

Before assuming DNB’s presidency, Knot served as Deputy Treasurer-General and Director of Financial Markets at the Dutch Ministry of Finance (2009–2011). He held various positions at DNB from 1995-2009, interspersed with positions at the International Monetary Fund (1998-1999) and the former Dutch Pensions and Insurance Supervisory Authority (2003-2004).

He recently joined the Peterson Institute for International Economics as a Distinguished Visiting Fellow. He is an active member of the Group of Thirty, a global advisory body of economic and financial leaders, and the CFA Institute Systemic Risk Council and he advises the European Commission and the European Stability Mechanism respectively on central bank independence for EU candidate countries and on institutional reforms.

Knot also holds academic positions as (honorary) Professor in Monetary Stability since 2015 at the University of Amsterdam and honorary professor of Money and Banking at the University of Groningen since 2005.

Knot earned his undergraduate degree with honors in economics from the University of Groningen in 1991 and his doctorate in economics there in 1995. In 2025, he was appointed Grand Officer of the Order of Orange-Nassau in recognition of his distinguished public service.

== Early life and education ==
Knot was born in the village of Onderdendam near Groningen. After completing his secondary education (vwo) at the Andreas College in Drachten, he studied economics at the University of Groningen. In 1995 he was awarded a doctorate from the same institution, with his doctoral thesis concerning exchange rate target zones and the differences in budget deficits and interest rates on government bonds between Members States of the European Union.

== Career ==
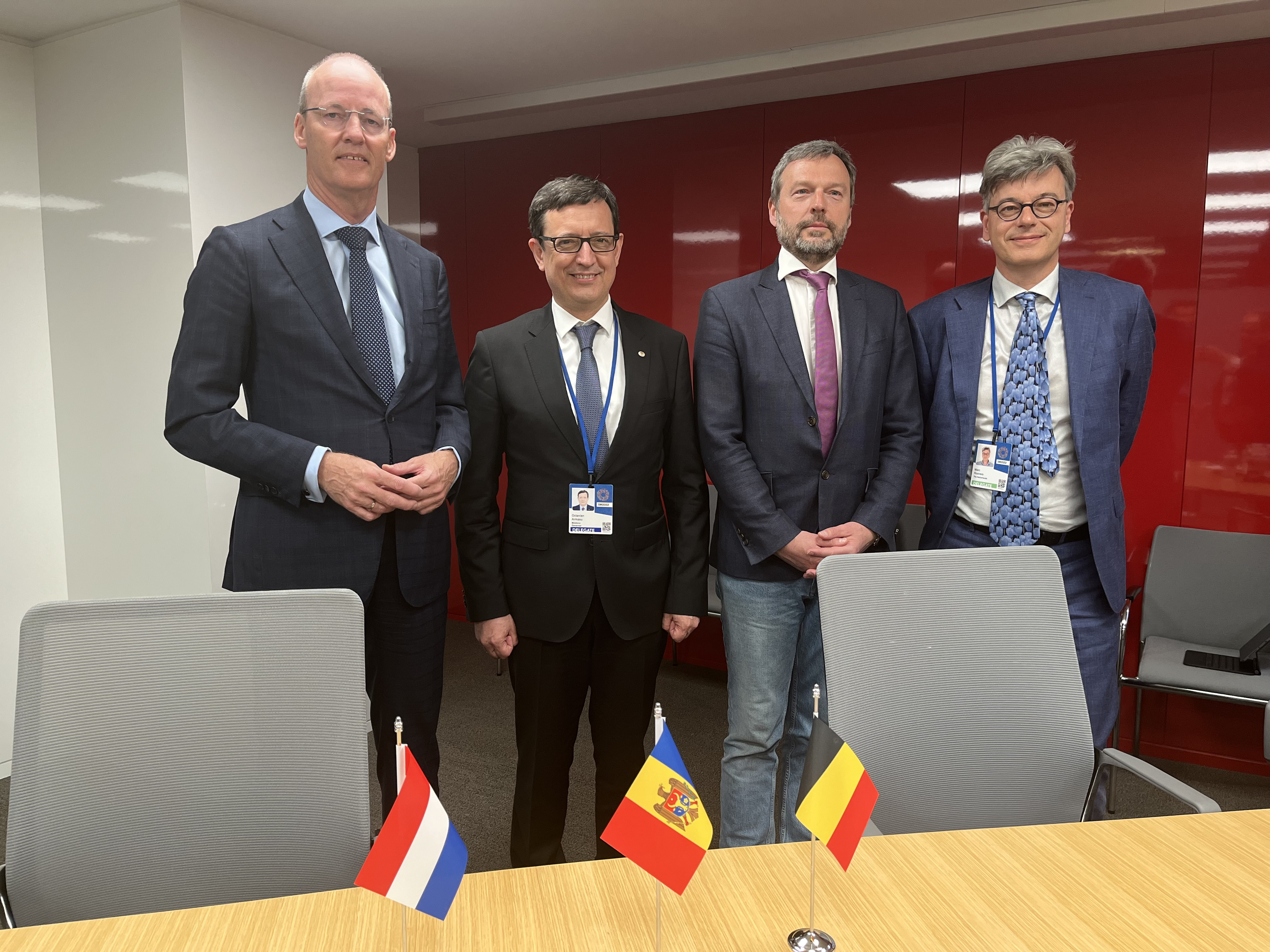
Knot with Octavian Armașu (BNM), Pierre Wunsch (NBB) and Marc Roovers (NBB) in Washington, DC, 23 April 2022

After obtaining his doctorate Knot began working as a Senior Economist at De Nederlandsche Bank in the Department of Monetary and Economic Policy. In early 1998 he left this post to become an economist in the European Department of the International Monetary Fund in Washington DC where he helped establish the Euro Area desk. End-1999, he returned to De Nederlandsche Bank, as the head of Banking and Supervisory Strategies Department. After serving in this capacity for three years, in December 2002 he left De Nederlandsche Bank again to become the director of the Dutch Pensions and Insurance Authority, charged with supervision of all Dutch pension funds and insurance companies. In 2004 the Pensions and Insurance Authority was merged with De Nederlandsche Bank, and Knot was appointed as director of the Supervisory Policy Division at De Nederlandsche Bank. In 2009 he left De Nederlandsche Bank once more to become Director of Financial Markets, and Deputy Treasurer General of the Dutch Ministry of Finance. In 2011, he was appointed President of the Dutch Central Bank DNB and thereby member of the ECB's Governing Council where he stayed a leading figure for 14 years. He took office in the midst of the euro crisis and was an influential voice in the ECB crisis response.

His tenure at the ECB was marked by a succession of crises that transformed his thinking and contributed to reshape the architecture of the European Monetary Union. Three episodes stand out in particular articulated around important speeches. He arrived at the Governing Council relatively skeptical about asset purchase programmes but embraced the move by Mario Draghi to launch the OMT programme, which contributed to stabilize the monetary union, repair monetary policy transmission channels and erase redenomination risks. He accepted then, and expressed publicly after, the need for the ECB to be able to play the role of lender of last resort in government bond markets. He was more skeptical about the subsequent ECB's PSPP programme, which he considered had limited effectiveness, but he was a strong supporter of the ECB's PEPP programme in response to the COVID crisis. On the question of fiscal policy, he remained relatively faithful to the Dutch tradition of fiscal orthodoxy and conditionality. But Knot came to endorse the need to take due care for the aggregate fiscal stance of the euro. He also supported the need for common European borrowing to finance European public goods with appropriate safeguards and accountability at a time when it was not popular in Dutch politics, thereby proving his intellectual and political independence. Finally, he ended his tenure at the ECB supporting the expansion of the international role of the euro and the general objective of supporting Europe's strategic autonomy at a time when many European central bankers were indifferent. His legacy at the ECB on monetary policy issues is usually characterized as one of princpled pragmatism. Knot also served as the vice chairman of the Financial Stability Board from 2018 to 2021 when he replaced Randal Quarles as chairman until 2025 when he was replaced by Andrew Bailey. In this tenure at the FSB he focused on a number of issues starting with the growing role of Non Bank Financial Intermediaries and ended with work on digital financial architecture. He played a critical role in shoring up transatlantic cooperation on financial regulation at a time where risks of fragmentation were building.

In 2026, following the announcement by ECB President Christine Lagarde that she would be stepping down from her position early, his name began to appear in the European press as one of the most likely candidates to succeed her, alongside the Spanish economist Pablo Hernández de Cos. At the same time, he received public support from main dutch political parties. Ultimately, in November 2026 he was formally nominated as candidate to the ECB Presidency.

== Other activities ==
=== International organizations ===
- European Central Bank (ECB), ex-officio member of the Governing and General Council
- European Systemic Risk Board (ESRB), ex-officio member
- Bank for International Settlements (BIS), ex-officio member of the Board of Directors
- International Monetary Fund (IMF), ex-officio member of the Board of Governors

=== Non-profit organizations ===
- Chair of the Teylers Museum Supervisory Board from 2013-2021 en Chair of the Clinclowns Supervisory Board from 2014 to 2022
- Osservatorio Permanente Giovani-Editori, member of the international advisory board
- Trilateral Commission, member of the European Group
- Teylers Museum, member of the supervisory board

== Personal life ==
Knot is married and has two children. He currently lives in Amsterdam, which is where De Nederlandsche Bank is headquartered.

Government offices
Preceded by Nout Wellink	President of De Nederlandsche Bank; 2011–present	Incumbent
Diplomatic posts
Preceded by Randal Quarles	Chair of the Financial Stability Board; 2021–2025	Succeeded by Andrew Bailey
