= Nout Wellink =

Dutch economist and former central banker

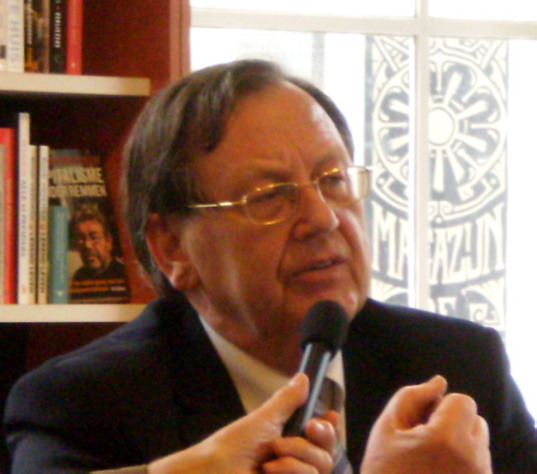
Wellink during a public interview

Arnout Henricus Elisabeth Maria "Nout" Wellink (born 27 August 1943) is a Dutch economist and former central banker.

In 2010, Financial News determined that Wellink was the man who was believed to have wielded the greatest influence on worldwide financial oversight including "game-changing proposals on capital requirements and liquidity" for the world's banks. He was president of De Nederlandsche Bank (DNB), a director of the Bank for International Settlements (BIS) from 1997 to 2012 and chairman of the board from 2002 through 2006. Also, Wellink was a member of the Governing Council of the European Central Bank from 1999 to 2012, a governor of the International Monetary Fund (IMF) and a member of the Financial Stability Board (FSB). Since October 2012 he has been a member of the board of the Bank of China.

== Early life ==
A native of Bredevoort, Wellink studied law at Leiden University from 1961 to 1968. He was awarded a Ph.D. degree in economics from Erasmus University Rotterdam in 1975.

== Career ==
From 1970 to 1982, Wellink worked at the Dutch Ministry of Finance. He rose through the bureaucracy to become director general of financial and economic policy. He, also, held the post of treasurer general.

In 1982, he became executive director of De Nederlandsche Bank (DNB), the central bank of The Netherlands. In 1997, he was named president of the bank. On 1 July 2011 his second term as president of DNB ended.

In 2000, Wellink became a member of the Trilateral Commission.

Nout Wellink's career has, also, been criticised. Under his supervision some serious problems arose in the Dutch banking sector, where DNB's actions have come under scrutiny by the Dutch parliament:

1. The bankruptcy of Landsbanki (Iceland) which bank was awarded a banking permit in 2008 (trading under the name Icesave) whilst the Banque de France had supposedly rejected a French banking permit. Formally Banque de France later on stated that they never received request from Icesave for permit as a "credit institution" but it was allowed to progress with its pending business in France. Later that same year Landsbanki went bankrupt and was nationalized by the Icelandic government.
2. The bankruptcy of DSB in 2009 which bank was awarded a banking permit by DNB in 2005. Subsequent analysis showed that at the time the banking permit was awarded DSB's risk management still had serious flaws and also the continuity of its business model was deemed risky. Based on a plan of improvement and appointment of a supervisory board DNB issued the permit. After the demise of DSB it turned out that the supervisory board had little influence on the behaviour of its CEO Mr. Dirk Scheringa, the planned improvement of its risk management was far behind schedule and the change of its businessmodel also wasn't implemented.
3. In 2007 Fortis, Banco Santander and RBS successfully purchased ABN Amro with the plan to split the bank into different pieces. Though a major system bank and pivotal for the Dutch economy DNB approved the takeover. In 2008, it turned out that Fortis was hurt badly by the credit crisis, which -ultimately- led to nationalization of both Fortis and ABN Amro by the Belgian and Dutch governments, respectively. The Dutch parliament researched this action, and DNB's actions were highly criticized.

=== Basel Committee ===
From 2006 through 2011, Wellink was chairman of the Basel Committee on Banking Supervision (BCBS). BCBS examines and proposes ways to reconfigure global banking regulations. Wellink's point of view is not fixed, encompassing the premise that "a resilient banking system is central to sound financial markets and growth. Supervisors cannot predict the next crisis but they can carry forward lessons from recent events to promote a more resilient system which can weather shocks, whatever the source."

== Selected works ==
Wellink published works include books and articles.

- Beyond the crisis: the Basel Committee’s strategic response (2009)
- President's speech (2005)
- The role of national central banks within the European System of Central Banks: The example of De Nederlandsche Bank (2002), with Bryan Chapple and Philipp Maier
- Jonge wijn in oude zakken : op weg naar een nieuwe Nieuwe economie (2001)
- Overheidsfinanciën (1978), with Lenze Koopmans, 201 pages

== Honours ==
- Commander of the Order of Orange-Nassau
- Knight of the Order of the Netherlands Lion
- Honorary doctorate from the University of Tilburg
