= Jo Ritzen =

Dutch politician (born 1945)

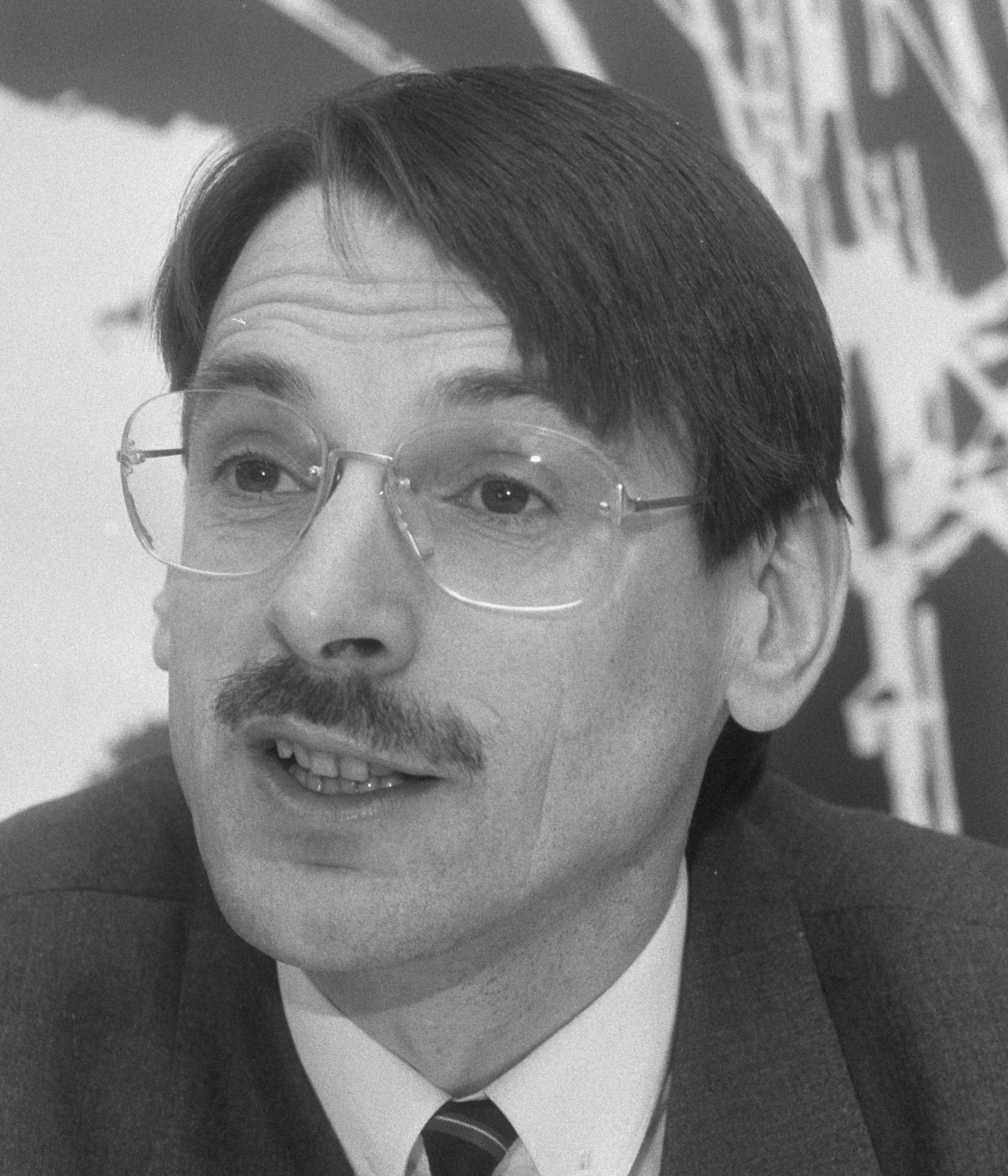

Minister of Education, Culture and Science
- In office 7 November 1989 – 3 August 1998
- Prime Minister: Ruud Lubbers (1989–1994); Wim Kok (1994–1998
- Preceded by: Gerrit Braks
- Succeeded by: Loek Hermans

Minister of Welfare, Health and Culture
- In office 16 July 1994 – 22 August 1994
- Prime Minister: Ruud Lubbers
- Preceded by: Hedy d'Ancona
- Succeeded by: Els Borst

Personal details
- Born: Jozef Maria Mathias Ritzen; 3 October 1945 (age 81) Heerlen, Netherlands
- Party: Labour Party (from 1970)
- Other political affiliations: Pacifist Socialist Party (1969–1970)
- Education: Delft Institute of Technology (Bachelor of Engineering, Master of Engineering, Master of Science in Engineering); Erasmus University Rotterdam (Bachelor of Economics, Master of Economics, Doctor of Philosophy)
- Occupation: Politician · Economist · Civil engineer · Researcher · Financial adviser · Political consultant · Management consultant · Nonprofit director · Academic administrator · Author · Professor

Jozef Marie Mathias "Jo" Ritzen (born 3 October 1945) is a retired Dutch politician of the Labour Party (PvdA) and economist.

Ritzen worked as researcher at the Delft Institute of Technology from July 1969 until June 1972 and at the Erasmus University Rotterdam from June 1972 until July 1976. Ritzen worked as a civil engineering consultant in Bangladesh from August 1976 until April 1978 and as a visiting professor of Education economics at the University of California, Berkeley from September 1978 until May 1979. Ritzen worked as an associate professor of Public economics at the Radboud University Nijmegen from May 1978 until January 1981 and a professor of Education economics at the Erasmus University Rotterdam from January 1981 until September 1982. Ritzen worked as a political consultant for the Labour Party from September 1982 until November 1989 and also as science advisor for the Leader of the Labour Party and Parliamentary leader of the Labour Party in the House of Representatives Joop den Uyl from September 1982 until July 1986. Ritzen also worked as a distinguished visiting professor at the Robert M. La Follette School of Public Affairs of the University of Wisconsin-Madison from February 1988 until November 1989. After the election of 1989 Ritzen was appointed as Minister of Education and Sciences in the Cabinet Lubbers III, taking office on 7 November 1989. In January 1994 Ritzen announced that he would not stand for the election of 1994. Rtizen served as acting Minister of Welfare, Health and Culture following the resignation Hedy d'Ancona, holding both positions from 16 July 1994. Following the cabinet formation of 1994 formateur Wim Kok approached incumbent State Secretary for Education and Sciences Job Cohen for the post of Minister of Education and Sciences in the new cabinet but Cohen per his own request asked not to be considered for a cabinet post as his wife was diagnosed with multiple sclerosis. Kok subsequently approached Ritzen to continued in the post as the newly renamed Minister of Education, Culture and Science in the Cabinet Kok I, taking office on 22 August 1994. In December 1997 Ritzen announced his retirement from national politics and that he wouldn't stand for the election of 1998, the Cabinet Kok I was replaced by the Cabinet Kok II on 3 August 1998.

== Biography ==
=== Education and academic career ===
Ritzen started in 1963 at Bernardinus College in Heerlen. In 1970 he obtained an engineer's degree in physics from the Institute of Technology. He received his PhD degree in 1976 from the Erasmus Universiteit Rotterdam with the thesis "Education, economic growth, and income inequality metrics". The thesis received the Winkler Prins Prize as the best economics dissertation in the period 1975–1978.

Before entering politics, Ritzen worked in a variety of jobs: as a project consultant in former East Pakistan (now Bangladesh), as a lecturer in the economics of education at the University of California, Berkeley, at the Katholieke Universiteit Nijmegen (now Radboud University), and as a full professor in the economics of education at the Erasmus Universiteit from 1981 to 1982. In 1988-1989 he was a visiting distinguished professor at the Robert M. La Follette Institute of Public Affairs at the University of Wisconsin-Madison in the United States. He has written or co-authored eleven books. Many articles written or co-authored by him are published in the fields of education, economics, public finance and development economics.

=== Politics ===
In 1989 he became Minister of Education and Sciences in the third Lubbers Cabinet (Christian Democrats-Social Democrats, Lubbers-Kok). In the same cabinet he was Minister of Welfare, Health, and Culture (including Sports) for three months in 1994. That same year, with the installation of the cabinet Kok 1 (Liberals, Social Liberals and Social Democrats), he became Minister of Education, Culture, and Sciences until 1998.

As a minister he introduced the OV-studentenkaart in 1990, a card giving free public transportation to students, and later the Prestatiebeurs, a new form of student financing where student grants would only be available for those who completed their studies. The LSVb (one of the major student unions) resisted both initiatives.

Ritzen contributed greatly to the reformation of the governance of Higher Education. Institutes of higher education would be governed by a governing board selected from the leading people of the major directions of life (business, justice, culture), excluding politicians. This board appoints the managing board of the university which has full authority and responsibility. This reform is sometimes recognized as the basis for the success of Dutch universities in international rankings in the early decades of the 21st century.

During his period in office, many parts of the Dutch education system were reformed: secondary education, through a law which made transitions from different streams easier ("basisvorming"), the second stage of secondary education with more emphasis on self-learning of students and vocational education (a law abbreviated as "WEB").

Also, the science system was substantially modified amongst others by including public private programs, between industry and public research institutes.

Ritzen was the longest-serving Minister of Education in the EU and one of longest serving in the world.

In 1998, after his term as a Minister he became an adviser to the President of the World bank, Jim Wolfenson and later a vice presidents of the World bank, serving in the Research Department (together with Chief Economists Joe Stiglitz and Nick Stern as) and as vice president for Human Development.

He left the World Bank to become president of Maastricht University in February 2003 until February 2011. During that period, Maastricht University grew to become one of the leading international teaching and research universities, with almost half of its students coming from abroad and problem-based learning as the primary educational method. In 2013, the university was ranked number 6 worldwide in the Times Higher Education Ranking of young ("under 50") universities (established after 1963).

During his career he has made significant contributions to agencies such as UNESCO and OECD, especially in the field of education and social cohesion. He also served on the Supervisory Board of Educational Testing Service (Princeton) from 2002 to 2014 and to several Dutch firms from 1981 to 1989 (before becoming a Minister).

He is now honorary professor of Maastricht University, senior advisor to the International Institute of Labor Studies IZA in Bonn, member of the International Advisory Board of RANEPA (Moskou) and KAU (Jeddah), adviser to several ministers of education, Chair and Founder of Empower European Universities and Initiator of the Vibrant Europe Forum, whose goal is to contribute to the European Parliamentary Elections in the areas of innovation, higher education, research, labour market, greening and income equality policy. He is also the President of the Conflict and Education Learning Laboratory, a non-profit foundation, registered in the Netherlands, which is dedicated to working for an international agreement to reduce divisive stereotypes in school textbooks.

Since 2015 he has been active as the chairman of the International Museum for Family History's Friends Foundation.

== Decorations ==
Honours
| Ribbon bar | Honour | Country | Date | Comment |
| | Knight of the Order of the Netherlands Lion | Netherlands | 30 April 1986 | |
| | Knight of the Order of the Holy Sepulchre | Holy See | 8 June 1992 | |
| | Commander of the Order of the Crown | Belgium | 12 September 1996 | |
| | Officer of the Order of Orange-Nassau | Netherlands | 10 December 1998 | |

Political offices
| Preceded by Gerrit Braks; Ad interim | Minister of Education and Sciences; 1989–1994 | Succeeded by Himself as Minister of Education, Culture and Science |
| Preceded by Hedy d'Ancona | Minister of Welfare, Health and Culture; Ad interim 1994 | Succeeded by Els Borst as Minister of Health, Welfare and Sport |
| Preceded by Himself as Minister of Education and Sciences | Minister of Education, Culture and Science; 1994–1998 | Succeeded by Loek Hermans |
