= Sintermeertencollege =

School in The Netherlands

Coordinates: 50.877015°N 5.956821°E

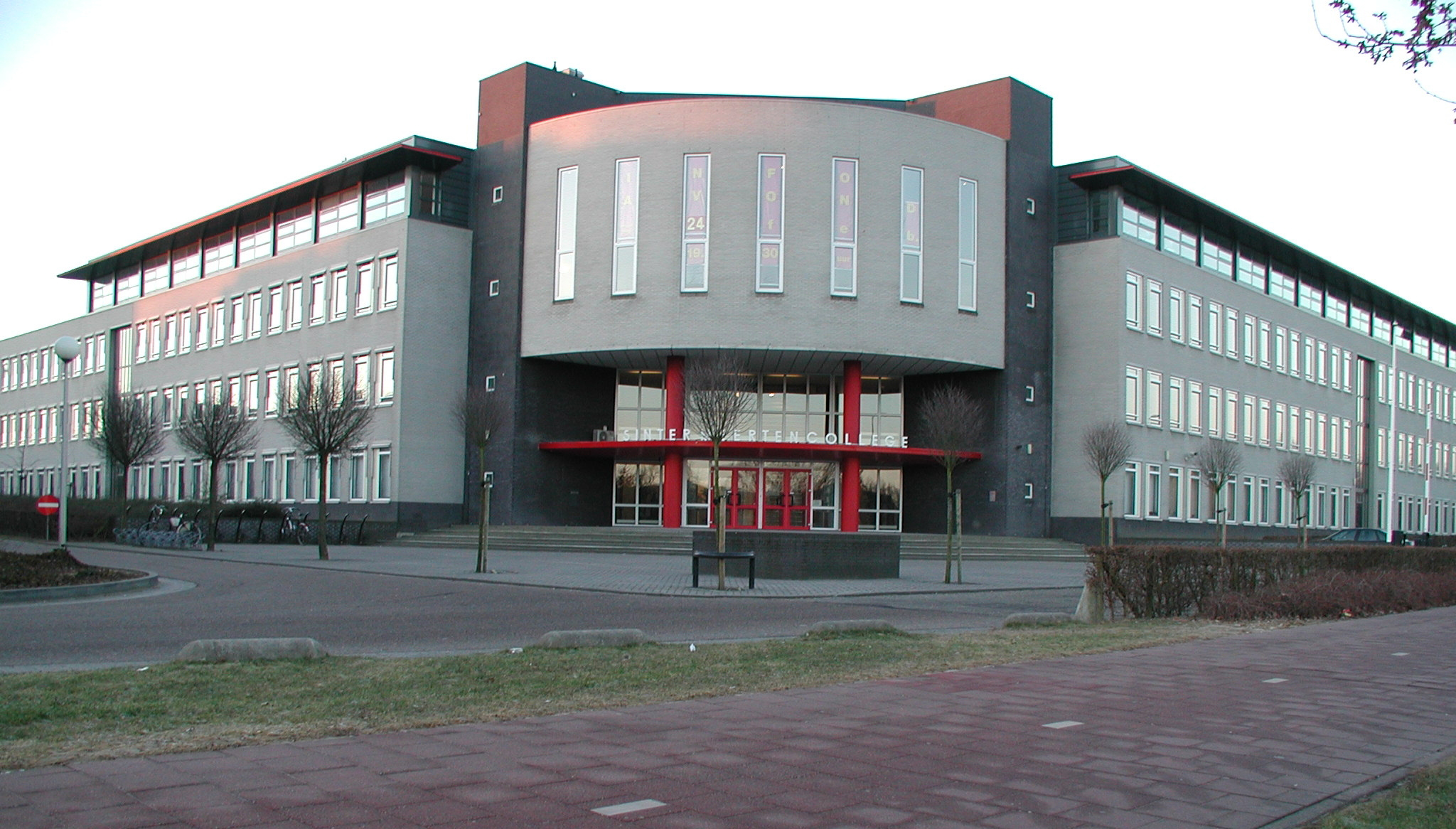
The front view of Sintermeertencollege

Sintermeertencollege is a comprehensive school in Heerlen, the Netherlands, established in 1967. The school was founded by the Bernardinuscollege as a dependence school for the Bernardinuscollege in Heerlen-west (Welten) Netherlands.

The school expanded in the 1980s with the Clara Mavo (vocational education) and merged with Coriovallum College in 1990.

The school offers a bilingual education.

In 1993, Sintermeertencollege moved to a new premises at Valkenburgerweg 219 in Heerlen, a modern 3 storey building. Sintermeertencolege specialises in ICT, Arts, Sports, and is part of the ELOS network

Sintermeertencollege is part of SVO│PL together with College Rolduc, Eijkhagencollege, Herlecollege, Praktijkonderwijs Parkstad Limburg, and Bernardinuscollege
