= Empower European Universities =

Dutch think tank

Empower European Universities (EEU) was a think tank based in Maastricht, the Netherlands that undertook research aiming at assessing the state of higher education policies in Europe. The organisation was launched in 2010, and terminated five years later, in 2015.

EEU was instituted as a foundation under Dutch law. It was founded on the basis of a manifesto signed by twenty former ministers for education and higher education experts in Brussels in June 2010. EEU was directed by a board of four members: Jo Ritzen (chair), Tessa Blackstone, Bálint Magyar and Eduardo Grilo. Its staff was typically composed by a few experienced researchers and by a number of part-time student assistants. Furthermore, EEU could count on a network of about 30 experts on higher education (typically one for each country covered by the assessment) collaborating as volunteers.

EEU received substantial financial support from Educational Testing Service (ETS) and the Netherlands Organisation for Scientific Research (NWO), and logistic support from the United Nations University - MERIT.

EEU produced two assessments of European higher education (one of which was published by one of IZA's academic journals, the other as a working paper) and a number of other conference and technical reports. The underlying idea of EEU's research work was to combine the analysis of available data with the feedback and qualitative information supplied by a network of 30 experts on higher education. According to observers of the European higher education landscape, EEU's aimed at "bringing Brussels out of the comfort zone" in terms of higher education policies, in particular by increasing funding and institutional diversity in this sector.
