= Olaf Sleijpen =

Dutch economist and central banker (born 1970)

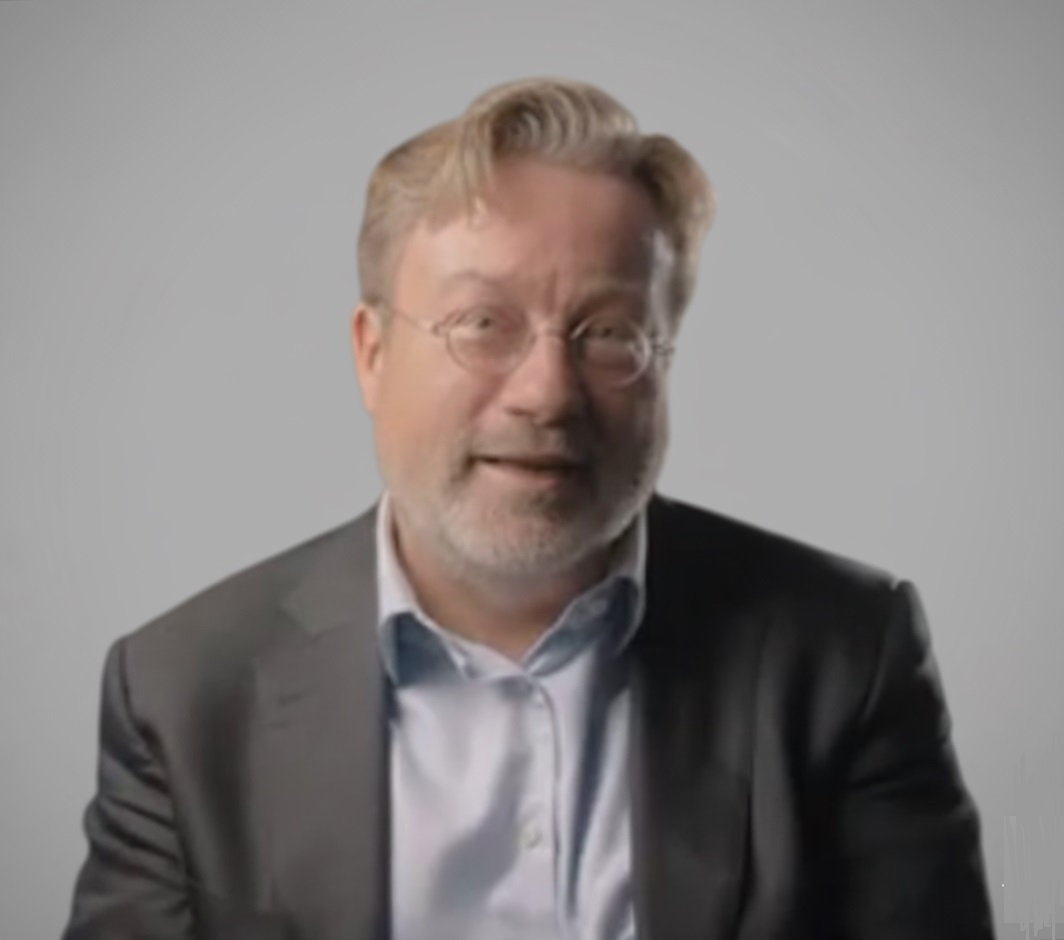
- Olaf Sleijpen in 2022

President of De Nederlandsche Bank
- Incumbent
- Assumed office 1 July 2025
- Preceded by: Klaas Knot

Personal details
- Born: August 10, 1970 (age 56) Wijlre, Netherlands
- Party: VVD
- Education: Rijksuniversiteit Limburg; University of Groningen
- Occupation: Economist
- Profession: Central banker, academic

Olaf Caspar Hendrik Marie Sleijpen (born 10 August 1970) is a Dutch economist, academic, and central banker. Since 1 July 2025, he has served as President of De Nederlandsche Bank (DNB), the Dutch central bank, succeeding Klaas Knot.

== Early life and education ==
Sleijpen was born in Wijlre and grew up in the hamlet of Schoonbron. He was raised in a Roman Catholic family with his parents and sister. His father worked for the Central Bureau of Statistics (CBS) in Heerlen, where he eventually became head of human resources; his mother was active in local politics for the CDA in Wijlre and later Valkenburg aan de Geul.

In 1988 he graduated cum laude from the Bernardinuscollege in Heerlen. In 1992 he earned a degree in economics, also cum laude, from the Rijksuniversiteit Limburg (now Maastricht University). In 1999 he obtained a doctorate in economics from the University of Groningen with a dissertation titled Does European Monetary Union require a fiscal union? Some evidence from the United States, under the supervision of Professor Lex Hoogduin.

== Career ==
From 1990 to 1992 Sleijpen worked as a research assistant at the European Institute of Public Administration (EIPA). Between 1993 and 2001 he held various roles at De Nederlandsche Bank, including economist in international affairs, senior economist in monetary and economic policy, deputy head of external relations and communications, and acting head of the Secretariat.

Between 2001 and 2004 he served as coordinator of advisers to the Executive Board and advisor to the president of the European Central Bank; until 2002 he was also advisor to the vice-president. He then worked at the pension fund ABP as acting head of Allocation and later as Director of General Financial Policy (2004–2008). At APG Group NV, he was Director of Corporate Strategy & Policy, acting secretary of the board, and Director of Institutional Clients as well as a board member of Cordares (2008–2010).

In 2011 he returned to DNB as Divisional Director of Pension Fund Supervision. He later headed the Policy Supervision division (2015–2018) and the Insurance Supervision division (2018). On 1 February 2020 he joined the Executive Board of DNB as Director of Monetary Affairs, responsible for economic policy and research, financial stability, financial markets, payments and market infrastructure, and statistics.

On 1 July 2025 Sleijpen became President of De Nederlandsche Bank for a seven-year term, succeeding Klaas Knot.

== Academic work and other roles ==
Since 2007 Sleijpen has been a part-time Professor of European Economic Policy at the School of Business and Economics of Maastricht University. He is also a member of the curatorium of the Peter Elverding Chair on Sustainable Business Regulation and Corporate Culture. Since 2014 he has been chair of the supervisory board of the Blue Fund, which supports LGBTQ emancipation.

== Personal life ==
Raised in the Catholic faith, he later joined the Mennonite Congregation of Amsterdam. He is a member of the People's Party for Freedom and Democracy (VVD), for which he stood as a candidate in the Amsterdam municipal council elections and participated in several party committees.

== Honours ==
- Young Captain Award, 2008 – recognition for young business leaders.

== Selected publications ==
Sleijpen has authored or co-authored publications on European monetary and economic integration, pension issues, and the supervision of financial institutions.
