= Elior Evangelical University =

University in Haiti

- Elior Evangelical University
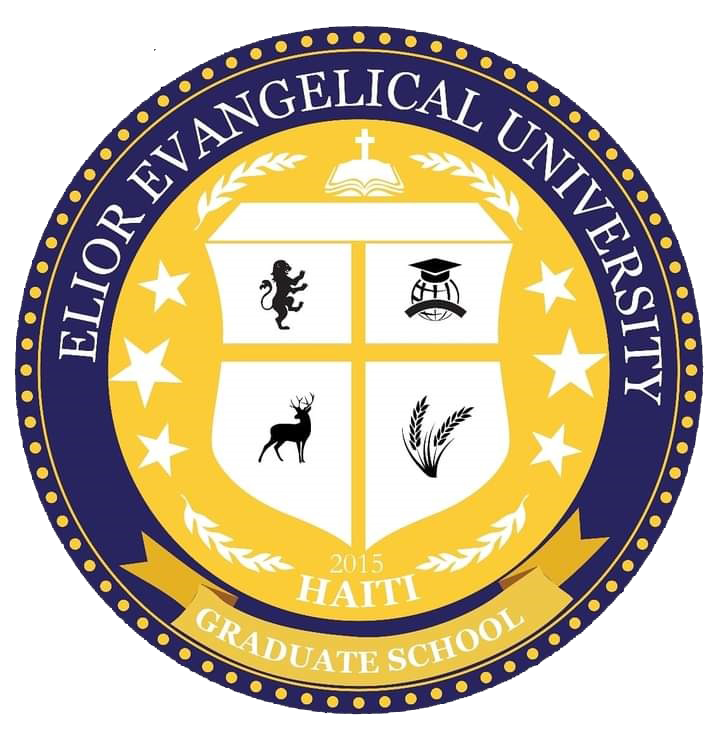
- Motto: We Will Give You Future
- Type: Public
- Established: July 8, 2015
- Founders: Dr. Desir Cedric
- Chancellor: Professor Desir Micheal C.O Jonathan
- Vice-Chancellor: Professor Desir Gabina Euchera
- Location: 4, Delmas 75, Rue Faustin 1er, Port-au-Prince, HT6141, Haiti
- Campus: urban
- Website: elioreuniversityedu.us

Elior Evangelical University (EEU) is a university in Port-au-Prince, Haiti, reaching other cities of Haiti, French-speaking regions of the Caribbean and in the United States of America. It offers undergraduate to postgraduate programs online, remotely and on campus in Port-au-Prince.

== History ==
In 2015, Dr Desir Cedric founded the university with various Haitian and African theologians, sociologists, anthropologists and entrepreneurs. The university created a Faculty of Theological and Religious Sciences and one of Health Sciences working with more than 176 Partner institutions in 84 Countries.

From 2016, after a crisis within the company, Cedric died from blood cancer on November 8, 2016. Professor Desir Michael C.O Jonathan took over by working with university ambassadors in Florida and Quebec. The Department of Postgraduate Studies deals with Master's and Doctorate programs, while integrating:

- Faculty of Education Sciences
- Faculty of Administrative Sciences
- Faculty of Agronomic Sciences
- Faculty of Development Sciences
- Entrepreneurship
