= De Nederlandsche Bank =

Central bank of the Netherlands

Coordinates: 52°21′31.40″N 4°54′0.0″E

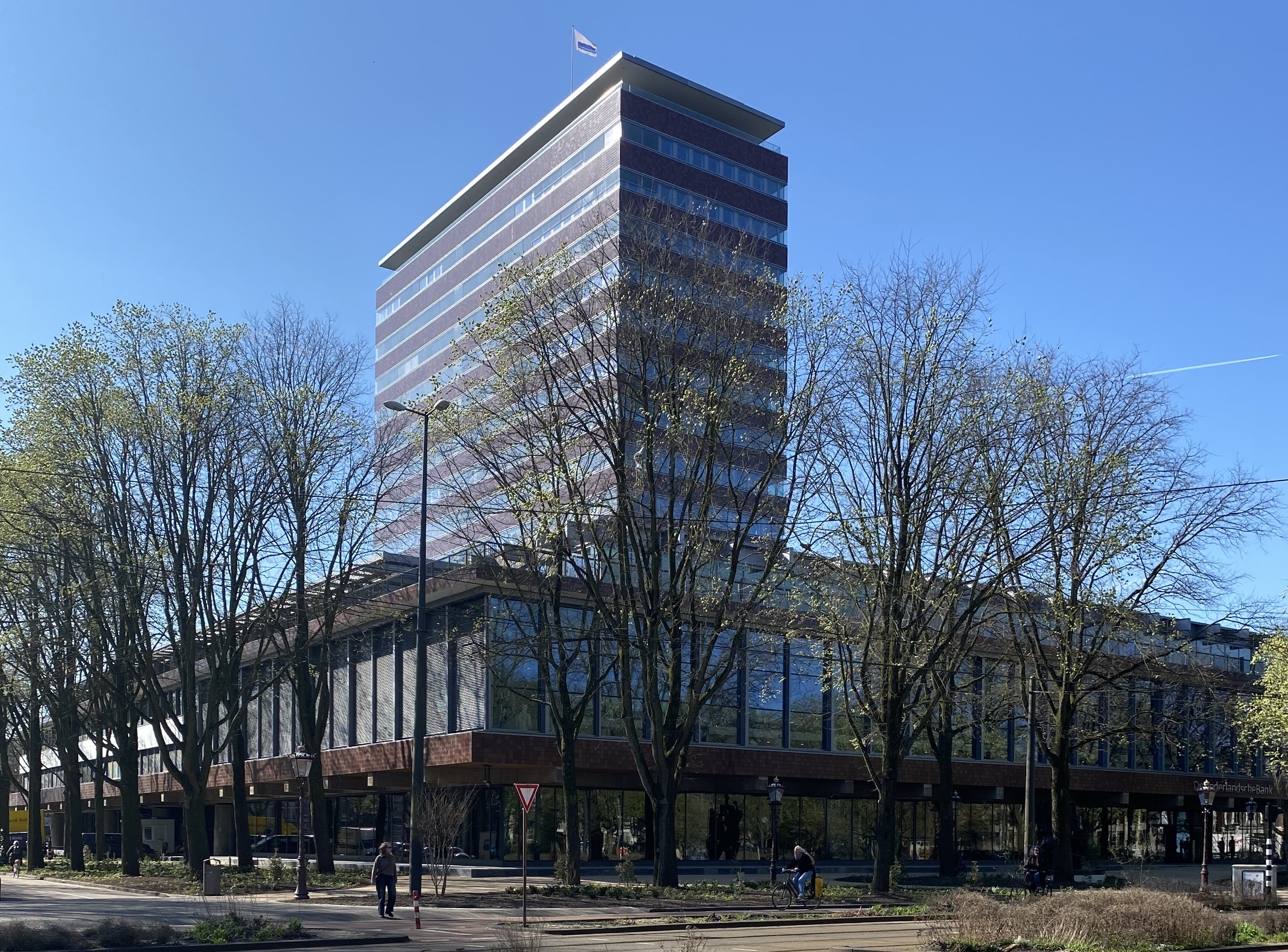
- Central bank of: the Netherlands
- Headquarters: Amsterdam
- Established: 25 March 1814; 212 years ago
- President: Olaf Sleijpen
- Reserves: 8 840 million USD
- Succeeded by: European Central Bank (1999)^{1}
- Website: dnb.nl
- ^{1} De Nederlandsche Bank still exists but many functions have been taken over by the ECB.

De Nederlandsche Bank (Dutch pronunciation: [də ˈneːdərlɑntsə bɑŋk], lit. 'The Dutch Bank', abbr. DNB) is the national central bank for the Netherlands within the Eurosystem. It was the Dutch central bank from 1814 to 1998, issuing the guilder. It was originally founded by King William I, and has been since transformed into a state-owned public limited company (Dutch: naamloze vennootschap, abbreviated NV). In English, it generally goes by its name in Dutch, but is also occasionally referred to as the Netherlands Bank.

In addition to its monetary role, De Nederlandsche Bank is also a financial supervisory authority. In that capacity, it increasingly implements policies set at the European Union level. It is the national competent authority for the Netherlands within European Banking Supervision. It is a voting member of the respective Boards of Supervisors of the European Banking Authority (EBA) and European Insurance and Occupational Pensions Authority (EIOPA). It is the designated Dutch National Resolution Authority and plenary session member of the Single Resolution Board (SRB). It provides the permanent single common representative for the Netherlands in the Supervisory composition of the General Board of the Anti-Money Laundering Authority (AMLA). It is also a member of the European Systemic Risk Board (ESRB).

== History ==
On 2 May 1998, the European heads of state or government decided that the Economic and Monetary Union (EMU) would begin on 1 January 1999 with eleven member states of the European Union (EU), the Netherlands included. As from 1 June 1998, the Dutch central bank, De Nederlandsche Bank, forms part of the European System of Central Banks (ESCB). On the same day, the new Bank Act (of 1998) came into force. Nearly 185 years into its existence, the Nederlandsche Bank entered a new phase.

In 2026, DNB shifted 86 tonnes of gold from US and Canada to London, stating that the reserves held in London would be easier to trade while also citing "geopolitical unrest." The share of gold held in London increased from 18.1 per cent to 32.1 per cent while the share held in New York and Ottawa were reduced to 18.5 per cent each.

== Tasks ==
Under the 1998 Bank Act – replacing that of 1948 – the bank has the following tasks:

- Within the framework of the ESCB, the bank shall contribute to the definition and implementation of monetary policy within the European Community (EC). The bank has the objective to maintain price stability. Without prejudice to this objective, the bank shall support the general economic policy in the EC.
- The bank shall hold and manage the official foreign reserves, and shall conduct foreign-exchange operations.
- The bank shall collect statistical data and produce statistics.
- The bank shall promote the smooth operation of payment systems; it shall take care of the banknote circulation.
- The bank shall supervise banks, investment institutions and exchange offices.
- The bank may, subject to permission by royal decree, perform other tasks in the public interest. The European Central Bank (ECB) may also ask the bank to perform extra tasks.

The first two tasks – also known as the ESCB tasks – ensue entirely from the Maastricht Treaty. Decisions in these areas are taken at the European level by the ECB Governing Council, on which the president of the Nederlandsche Bank has a seat. Promoting the smooth operation of payment systems has both a European and a national dimension. The statistical task is also partly ESCB-related and partly a national concern. The DNB is responsible for international macro-economic statistical analysis for countries outside the EU. These two tasks will not be transferred to ESCB level at the start of EMU. Here the Nederlandsche Bank remains fully in control. However, in a Europe where economies are becoming increasingly interlocked, many banking supervisory rules are drawn up at the international level. DNB serves as the banker's bank to general Dutch banks.

One of the government appointed members of the Social-Economic Council is always a representative of DNB.

== Head office ==
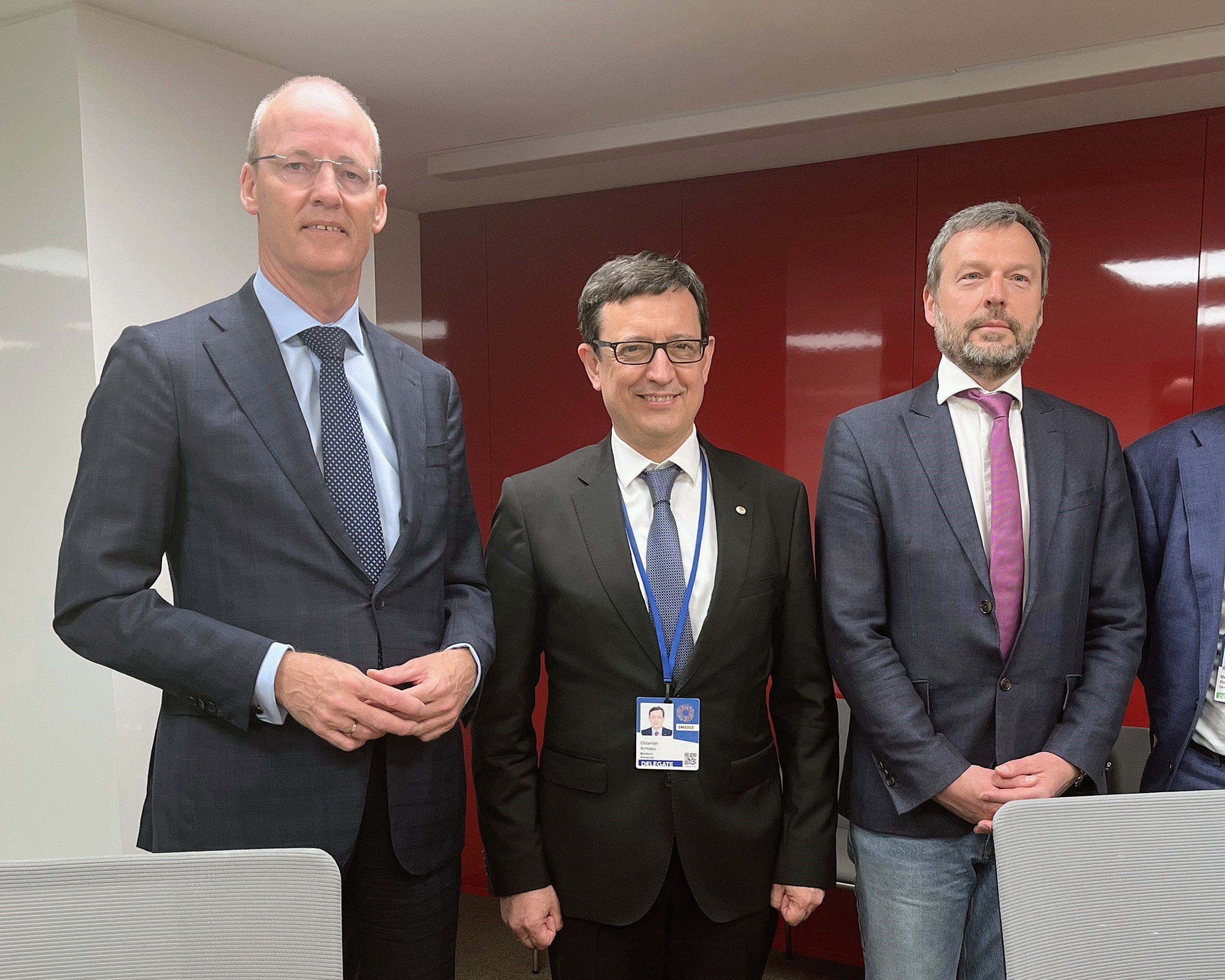
Then DNB governor Klaas Knot meeting with fellow bank governors Octavian Armașu (NBM) and Pierre Wunsch (NBB), April 2022

The bank was established from the start on Oude Turfmarkt, where it occupied 17th-century houses. In the 1860s, a purpose-built head office, designed by architect Willem Anthonie Froger, was erected on the same location and inaugurated in 1869. Nearly a century later in 1968, as the bank has left the building for its new seat, it was taken over by the University of Amsterdam which had long been established just nearby, and subsequently repurposed as the location of the Allard Pierson Museum, which opened there in October 1976.

In the 1960s, a new head office complex was constructed on Frederiksplein and inaugurated by Queen Juliana in May 1968. Architect Marius Duintjer's stark design of 1961 consisted on a low square base and a rectangular office tower. In the late 1980s, as the bank was running out of space, it was complemented with a second, round tower designed in 1984 by architects Jelle Abma and Marc a Campo, the construction of which was finished in 1989. In 2008, Marc a Campo designed a further extension by adding an extra floor to the square base. In a comprehensive renovation during the early 2020s, the round tower was demolished and the base remodeled to return the building to an exterior appearance more similar to the original one of the 1960s.

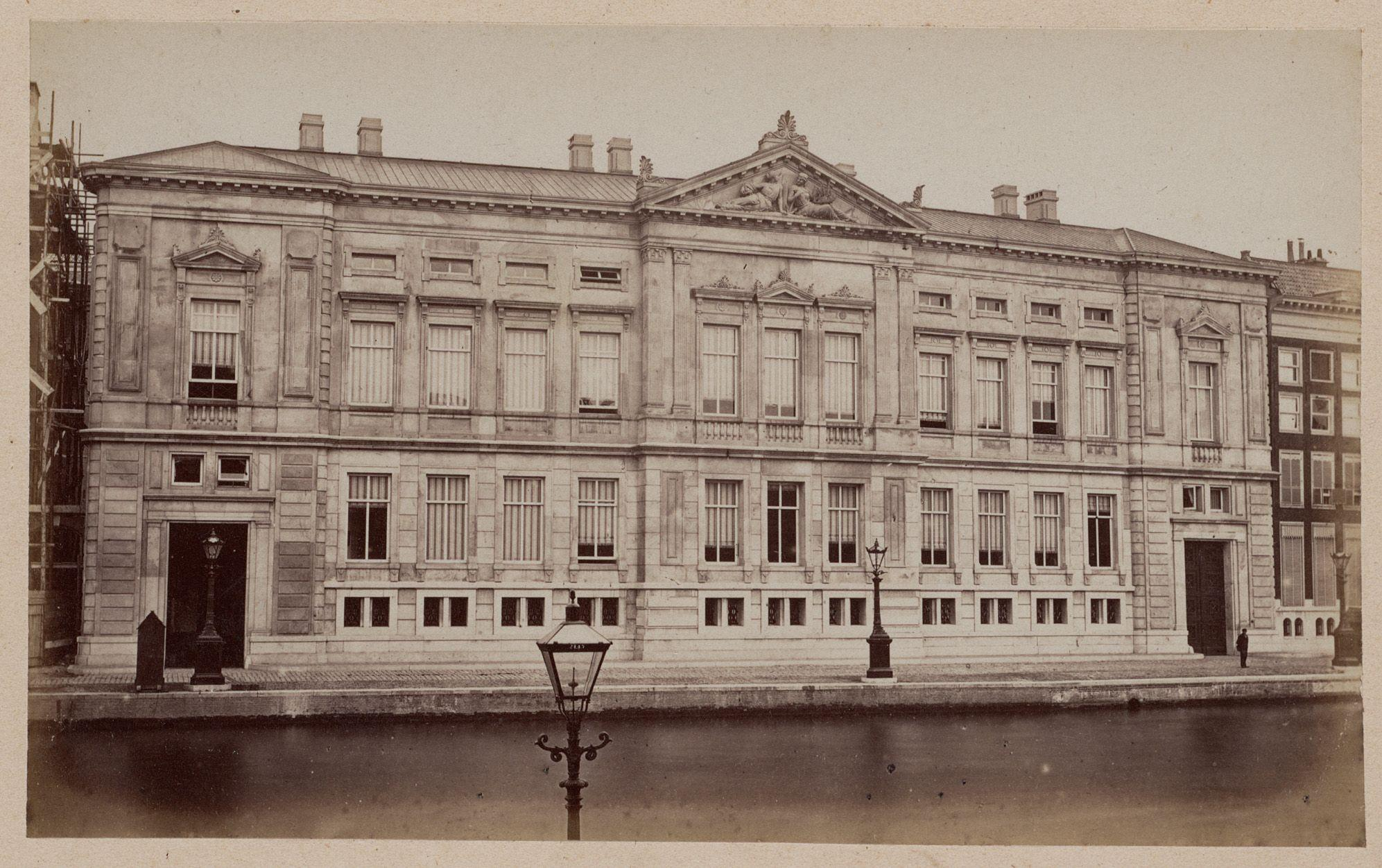
DNB head office at time of inauguration, 1869

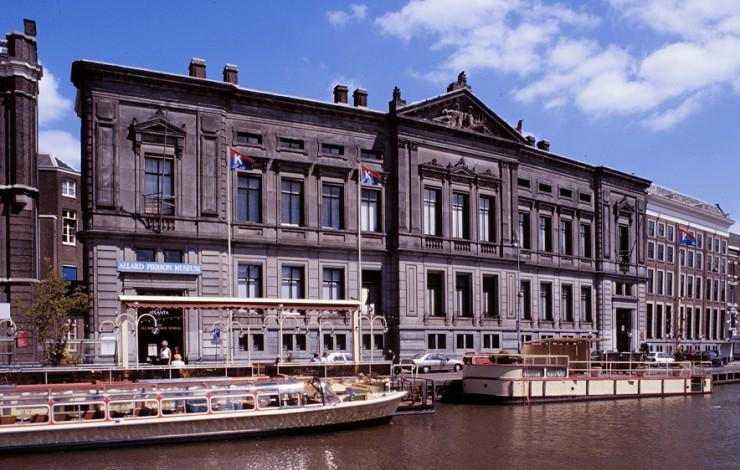
Old head office in 2006, repurposed as Allard Pierson Museum

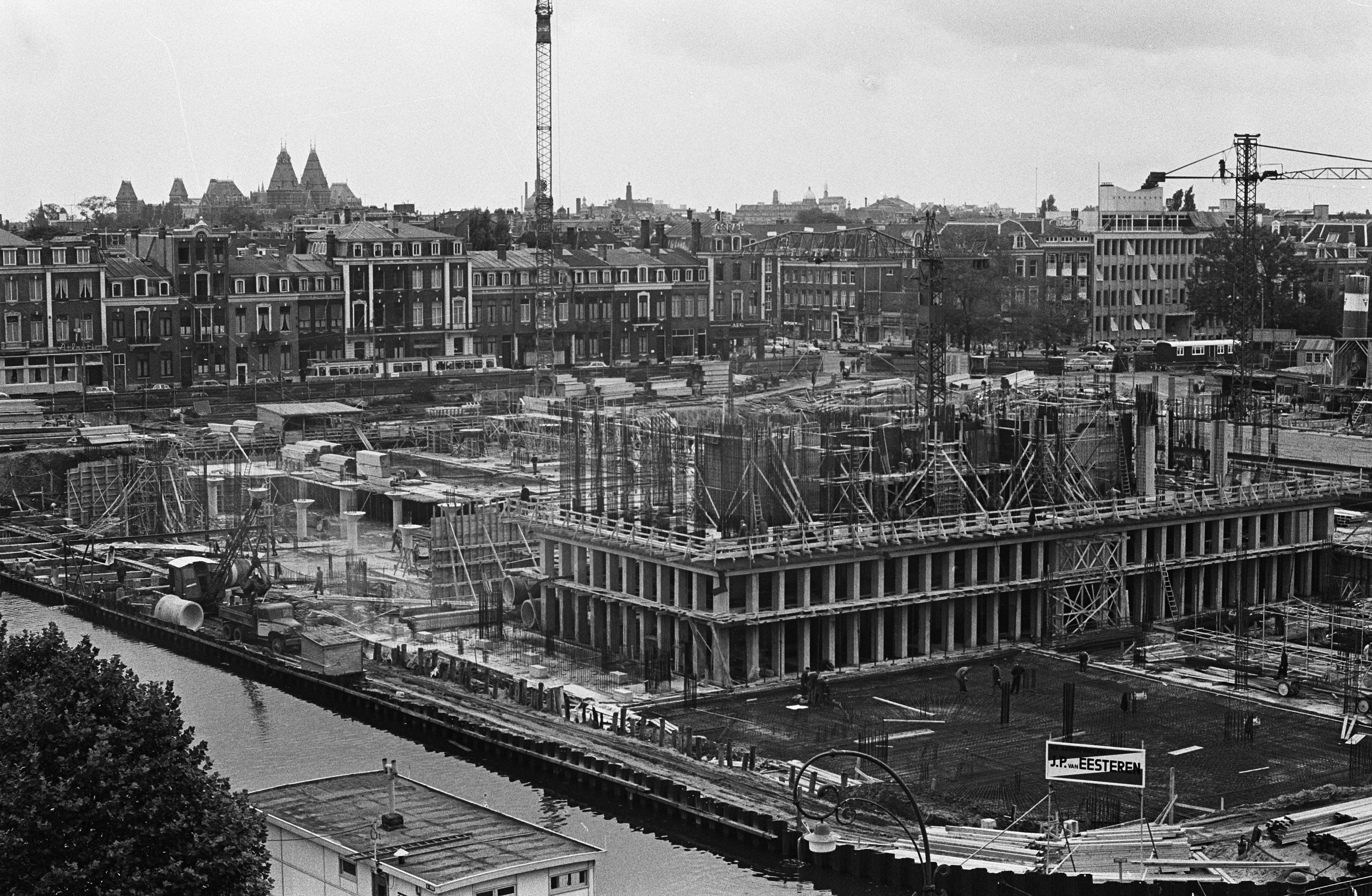
Construction works, 1963

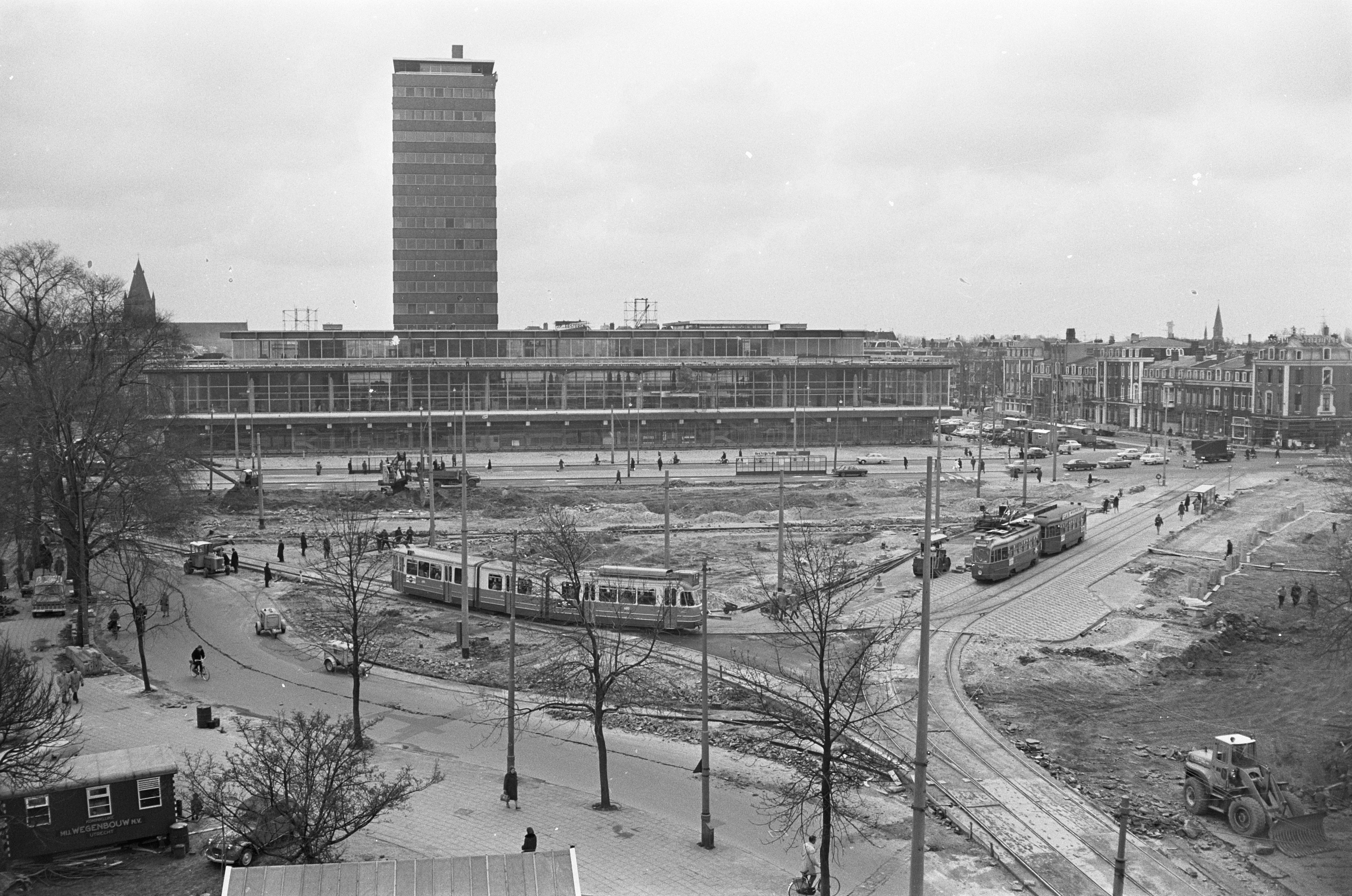
New head office complex, 1967

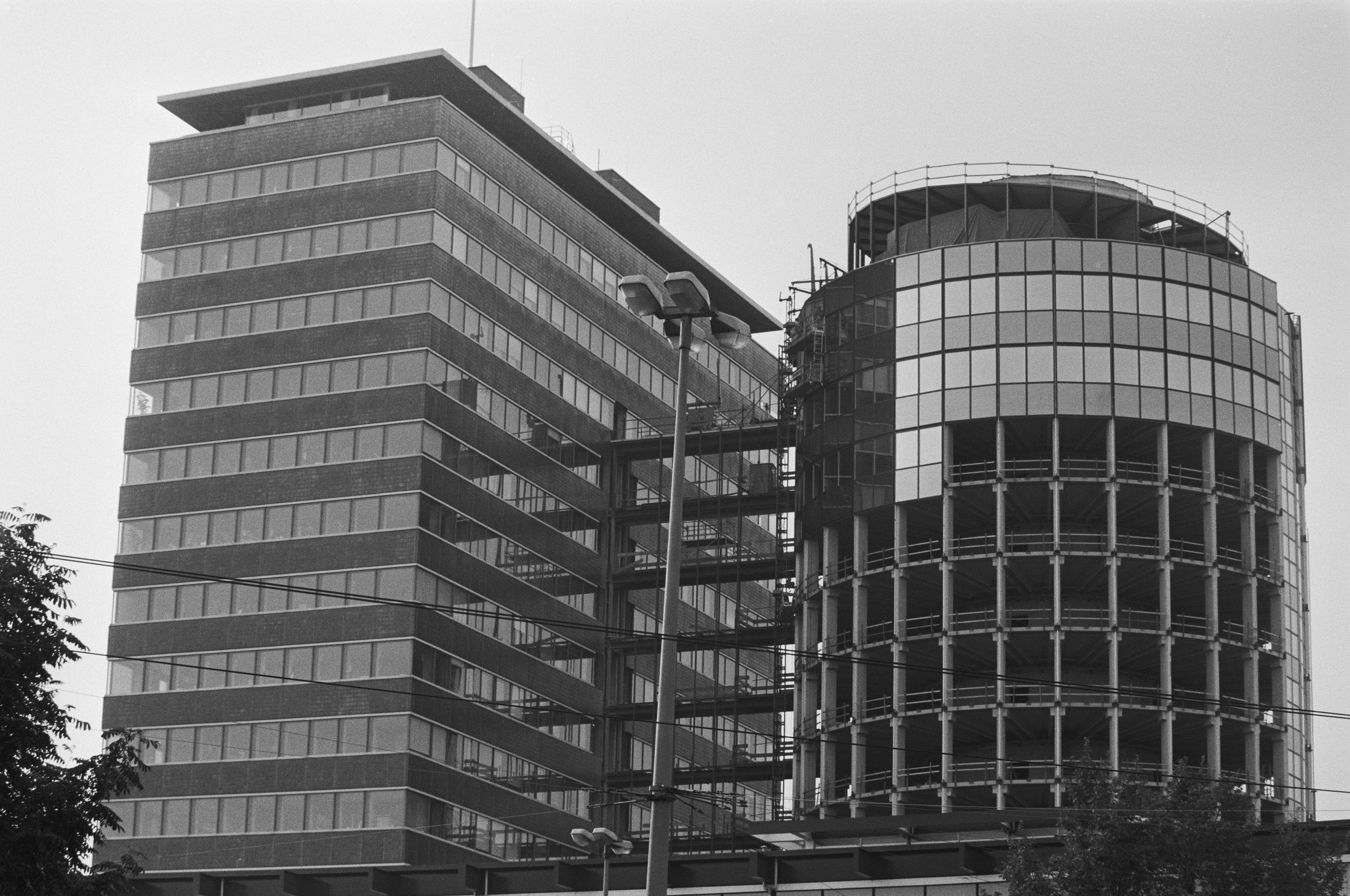
Construction of round tower, 1989

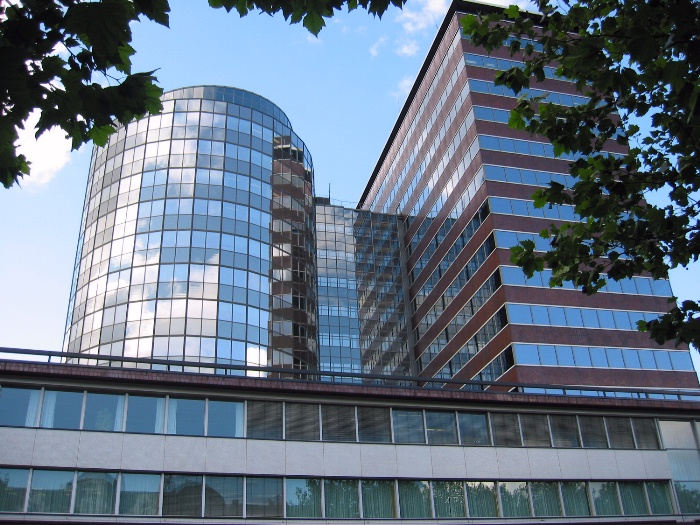
Late-1980s extension, photographed in 2004

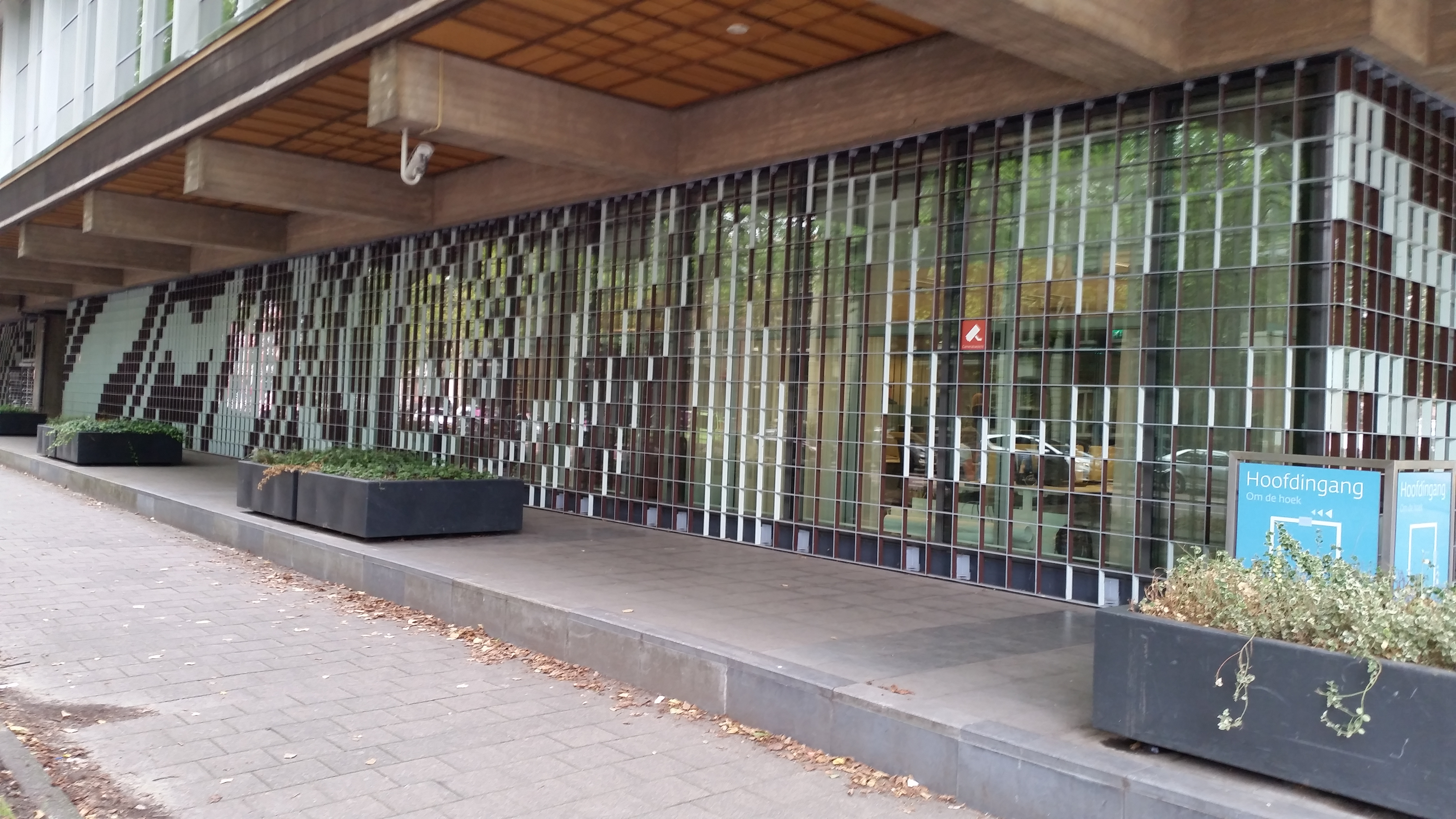
Street-level fence, 2018

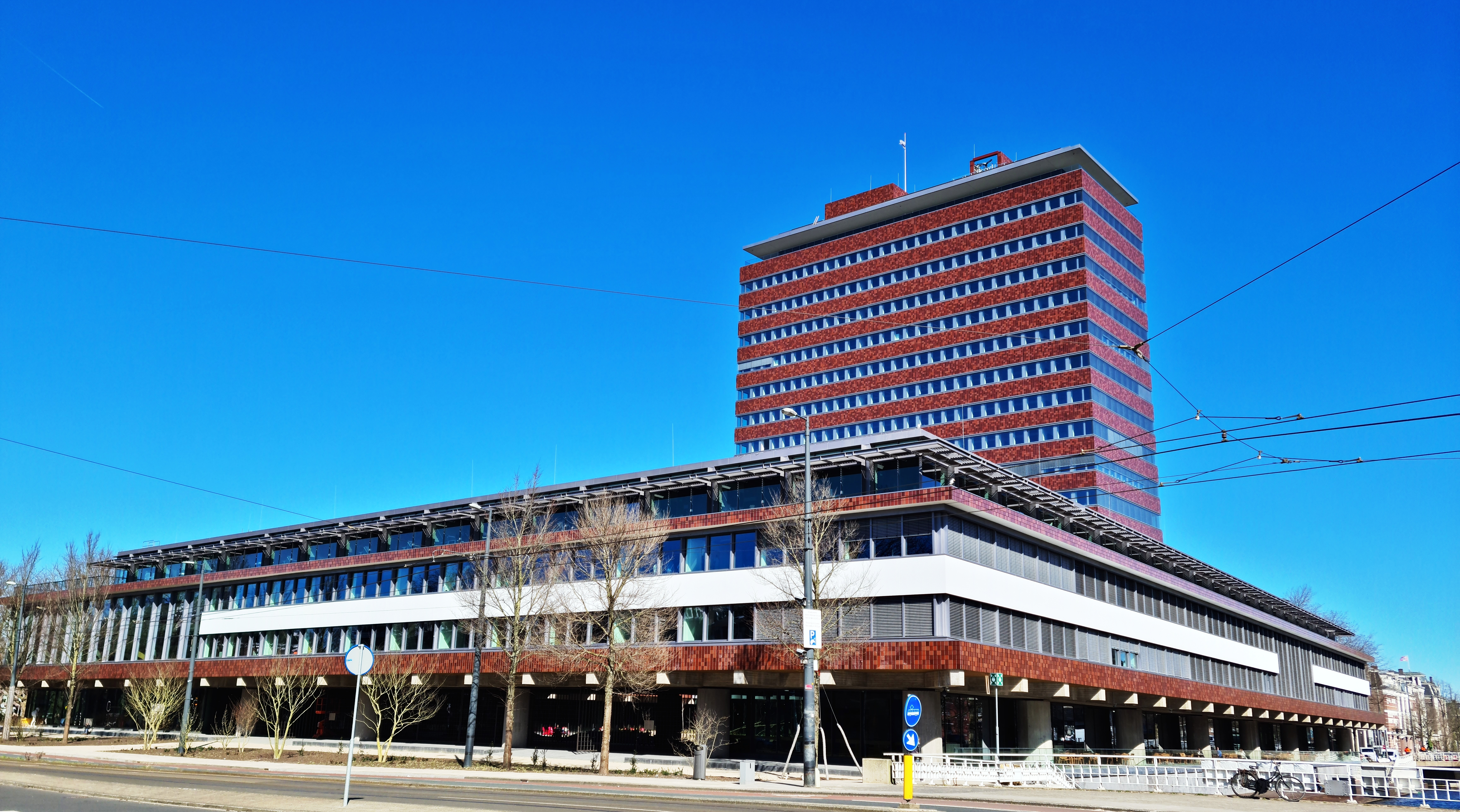
De Nederlandsche Bank, after finishing the refurbishment, 2025

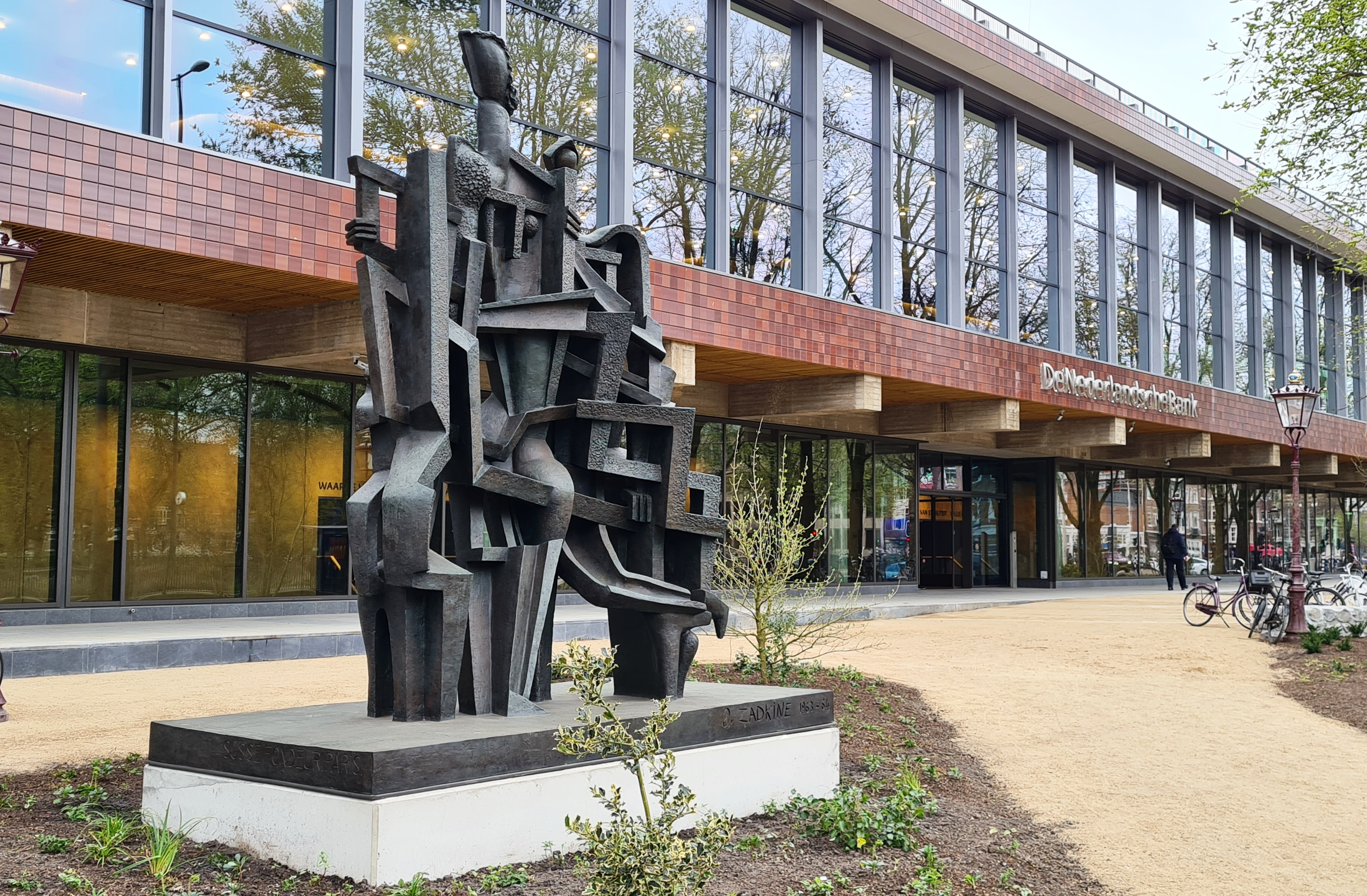
La Demeure Humaine by Ossip Zadkine, at the DNB entrance

== List of presidents ==
President of De Nederlandsche Bank		Took office	Left office	Term length	Previous experience(s)	Party
	Paul Iwan Hogguer	1814	1816	2 years		Independent
	Jan Hodshon	1816	1827	11 years		Independent
	Jaques Teysset	1827	1828	1 year		Independent
	Jacob Fock	1828	1835	7 years		Independent
Willem Mogge Muilman	Willem Mogge Muilman	1835	1844	9 years		Independent
	Abraham Fock	1844	1858	14 years		Independent
	Hendrik Croockewit	1858	1863	5 years		Independent
	Willem Mees	1863-1884	1884	21 years		Independent
Nicolaas Pierson	Nicolaas Pierson	1885	1891	6 years		Liberal Union
Norbertus van den Berg	Norbertus van den Berg	1891	1912	21 years		Independent
Gerard Vissering	Gerard Vissering	1912	1931	19 years		Independent
Leonardus Trip	Leonardus Trip	1931	1941	10 years		Independent
Meinoud Rost van Tonningen	Meinoud Rost van Tonningen	1941	1945	4 years		National Socialist Movement
Leonardus Trip	Leonardus Trip	1945	1946	1 year		Independent
Marius Holtrop	Marius Holtrop (1902–1988)	1 May 1946	1 May 1967	21 years, 0 days		Independent
Jelle Zijlstra	Jelle Zijlstra (1918–2001)	1 May 1967	1 January 1982	14 years, 245 days	Minister of Economic Affairs (1952–1959); Minister of Finance (1958–1963) (1966–1967); Prime Minister (1966–1967)	Anti-Revolutionary Party (1967–1980)
Jelle Zijlstra	Jelle Zijlstra (1918–2001)	1 May 1967	1 January 1982	14 years, 245 days	Minister of Economic Affairs (1952–1959); Minister of Finance (1958–1963) (1966–1967); Prime Minister (1966–1967)	Christian Democratic Appeal (1980–1982)
Wim Duisenberg	Wim Duisenberg (1935–2005)	1 January 1982	1 July 1997	15 years, 181 days	Minister of Finance (1973–1977)	Labour Party
Nout Wellink	Nout Wellink (born 1943)	1 July 1997	1 July 2011	14 years, 0 days	Treasurer–General (1977–1981)	Christian Democratic Appeal
Klaas Knot	Klaas Knot (born 1967)	1 July 2011	1 July 2025	14 years, 0 days		Independent
Olaf Sleijpen	Olaf Sleijpen (born 1970)	1 July 2025	Incumbent	1 year, 94 days		People's Party for Freedom and Democracy

== See also ==
- Economy of the Netherlands
- Central Bank of Curaçao and Sint Maarten
- Central Bank of Aruba
- Bank of Java
- Netherlands Authority for the Financial Markets
- List of central banks
- List of financial supervisory authorities by country
- List of banks in the Netherlands
