= Adams Avenue Parkway =

Road in South Weber, Utah

- 500 East
- Adams Avenue Parkway highlighted in red

Route information
- Maintained by Adams Avenue Parkway, Inc., Washington Terrace, & Utah Department of Transportation
- Length: 1.6 mi (2.6 km)
- Existed: June 27, 2001 (toll section)–present

Major junctions
- South end: I-84 in South Weber
- Toll Plaza in Washington Terrace
- North end: US 89 in Washington Terrace

Location
- Country: United States
- State: Utah
- Counties: Weber

Highway system
- Utah State Highway System; Interstate; US; State; Minor; Scenic

The Adams Avenue Parkway is a 1.6-mile-long (2.6 km) road that is almost entirely within Washington Terrace, Utah, United States, that connects Interstate 84 (I‑84) with U.S. Route 89 (US‑89/Washington Boulevard). (Note: Although Google Maps indicates that the Adams Avenue Parkway/US-89 (Washington Boulevard) intersection is located south of the border between Washington Terrace and South Ogden, the border runs immediately south of US-89 (Washington Boulevard). Therefore the intersection is actually within South Ogden.) Approximately 1/2 mile (800 m) of the southern end of the road is also a private toll road. The southern (toll) section opened in 2001 at a cost of $8.9 million (equivalent to $16.18 million in 2025) and was created after decades of requests by locals to connect the existing 500 East (Adams Avenue) to I‑84. The toll section allowed commuters to bypass the rest of US‑89 through southern Weber County to I‑84.

== Route description ==
The parkway begins at the Adams Avenue interchange on I‑84 (Exit 85) in South Weber in Davis County. (The diamond interchange, which existed prior to the construction of the southern end of the parkway, also provide a connection south to 475 East in South Weber.) On the north side of the interchange is an intersection to the west end of Cottonwood Drive, which continues easterly to Uintah. North of Cottonwood Drive the road widens to five lanes, begins the privately owned toll section, and crosses over the Weber River. (The river forms the border between South Weber and Washington Terrace, as well as between Davis and Weber counties.)

Heading northwesterly, the toll section (which has no shoulders, sidewalks, or side roads) has a posted speed limit of 35 mph (56 km/h). Just north of the river the parkway crosses over the Union Pacific Railroad's Evanston Subdivision tracks, before climbing the north river bank. The climb includes an elevation gain of more than 200 feet (61 m), but a maximum grade of nine percent, Near the top of climb, the parkway reaches the tollplaza, which collects the payments for both directions of traffic.

After one intersection with 5900 South, which presently serves only the toll road company's headquarters, a single commercial building, private maintenance gives way to a four-lane city street with sidewalks just shy of 5800 South. The roadway continues northeasterly to the top of the hill near 5600 South, where pre-existing Adams Avenue (500 East) heads north, passing the Ogden Regional Medical Center to an intersection with Washington Boulevard (US-89) on the Washington Terrace-South Ogden border. Adams Avenue continues through South Ogden and into Ogden as a minor street one block east of US-89, with a gap near 4600 South and more north of downtown Ogden. In 2006 approximately 1,400 cars traveled the parkway on an average weekday.

== Tolls ==
Tolls are collected in cash or via an ExpressCard account, a prepaid system that offers a discount for a $10 deposit to the account. The current toll is $2 in each direction for most vehicles and $1.00 additional if pulling a trailer. Extra large vehicles are $1 per axle. Previously emergency vehicles (ambulances) were not charged a toll, however beginning July 3, 2003, they must pay the standard $2 toll. To allow quick passage through the toll barrier, these vehicles pay through a charge account. The Utah Department of Transportation worked out an agreement during local road construction for four days in 2003 to allow commuters to use the parkway free of charge.

== History ==
The parkway was opened in 2001 after just under a year of construction. Then-governor Mike Leavitt suggested that a private company rather than the state would need to build the road.

The roadway cost $8.9 million (equivalent to $16.18 million in 2025) to build, of which the state provided $2 million (equivalent to $3.64 million in 2025). Additional funds came from taxes assessed on property owners along the parkway. The entire stretch of road between Washington Boulevard and I-84 was constructed or rebuilt by the Adams Avenue Turnpike LLC; however, they returned most of the road to local authorities. The only portion retained was a one-half-mile-long (0.80 km) segment between about 5800 South and I-84.

The roadway is defined under Weber County Ordinance, Title 31, which grants a franchise to Adams Avenue Turnpike LLC for an initial term of 50 years (expiring in 2051).

== Intersections ==
All exits are unnumbered.

County	Location	mi	km	Destinations	Notes
Davis	South Weber	0.0	0.0	I-84 – Riverdale, Morgan, I-15, I-80	Diamond interchange; southern terminus; Street continues south as 475 East to SR-60
Davis	South Weber	0.1	0.16	Cottonwood Drive southeast - Uintah	Immediately north of Cottonwood Drive is the south end of the private toll section
Davis–Weber county line	South Weber–Washington Terrace line	0.1	0.16	Bridge over Weber River and Union Pacific Railroad's Evanston Subdivision tracks	
Weber	Washington Terrace	0.5	0.80	Toll plaza	
Weber	Washington Terrace	0.5	0.80	East 5900 South	Immediately south of 5900 South is the north end of the private toll section
Weber	Washington Terrace	0.6	0.97	East 5800 South	
Weber	Washington Terrace	0.8	1.3	5700 South east - South Ogden	
Weber	Washington Terrace	1.0	1.6	5600 South east	
Weber	Washington Terrace	1.0	1.6	5550 South east	
Weber	Washington Terrace	1.2	1.9	5400 South east	
Weber	Washington Terrace	1.2	1.9	5530 South	
Weber	Washington Terrace	1.4	2.3	South Point Drive west	
Weber	Washington Terrace	1.5	2.4	5300 South east	
Weber	Washington Terrace–South Ogden line	1.6	2.6		
Weber	South Ogden	1.6	2.6	US 89 (Washington Boulevard) – Ogden, Uintah	Northern terminus; Street continues north as Adams Avenue
1.000 mi = 1.609 km; 1.000 km = 0.621 mi: Tolled

== See also ==
- List of toll roads in the United States
