= Interstate 84 (Oregon–Utah) =

Interstate Highway in the U.S. states of Oregon, Idaho, and Utah

Interstate 84
- I-84 highlighted in red

Route information
- Length: 769.62 mi (1,238.58 km)
- Existed: 1956 (as I-80N)–present
- NHS: Entire route

Major junctions
- West end: I-5 / US 30 in Portland, OR
- I-205 in Portland, OR; US 97 in Biggs Junction, OR; I-82 near Hermiston, OR; US 95 near Fruitland, ID; I-184 / US 20 in Boise, ID; US 93 near Twin Falls, ID; I-86 / US 30 near Burley, ID; I-15 / US 91 in Brigham City, UT; I-15 in Riverdale, UT
- East end: I-80 / US 189 in Echo, UT

Location
- Country: United States
- States: Oregon, Idaho, Utah

Highway system
- Interstate Highway System; Main; Auxiliary; Suffixed; Business; Future

Interstate 84 (I-84) is an Interstate Highway in the northwestern United States. The highway runs almost 770 miles (1239 km) from Portland, Oregon, to a junction with I-80 near Echo, Utah. The highway serves and connects Portland, Boise, and Ogden, Utah. With connections to other highways, I-84 connects these cities to points east and also serves as part of a corridor between Seattle and Salt Lake City. The sections running through Oregon and Idaho are also known as the Vietnam Veterans Memorial Highway.

The highway originally served as a fork of I-80 to serve the Pacific Northwest, and was originally numbered Interstate 80N. It was generally built along the corridor of U.S. Route 30 (US 30) and US 30S, which themselves largely followed the Oregon Trail; the US 30S designation was decommissioned in the 1970s after the freeway replacement was mostly complete. The highway was signed with the I-84 designation in 1980, when a 1977 change in guidelines took effect that discouraged highway numbers with directional suffixes. The renumbering resulted in two highways being numbered I-84, with the other located in the Northeastern United States.

== Route description ==
Lengths
	mi	km
OR	379	610
ID	275.74	443.76
UT	118.71	191.05
Total	769.62	1,238.58

=== Oregon ===
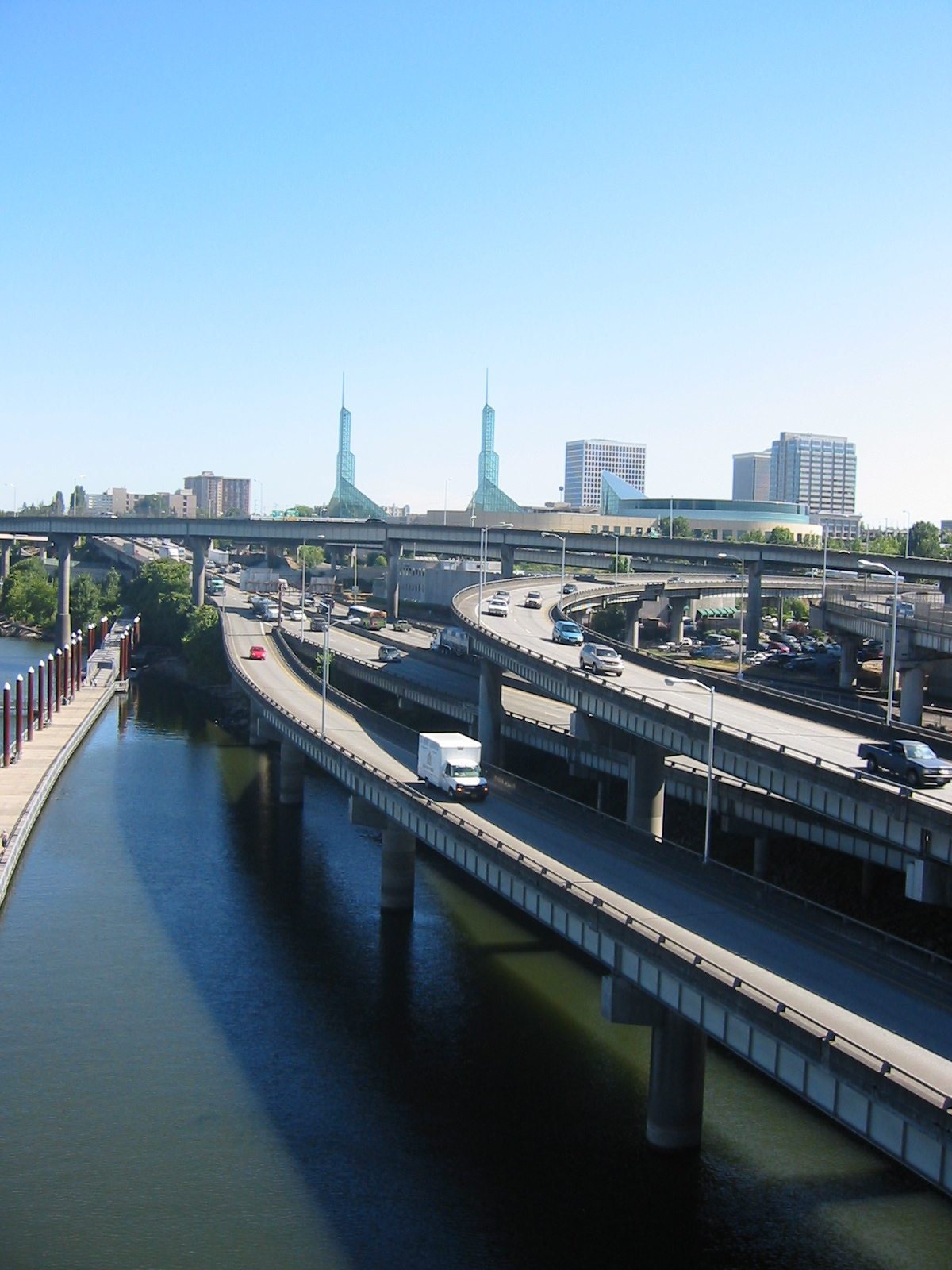
The western terminus of I-84 in Portland

In the Portland metropolitan area, I-84 is sometimes referred to as the "Banfield Freeway" or simply "the Banfield", although the official name is the Banfield Expressway. This freeway is named after Thomas H. "Harry" Banfield (1885–1950), the chairman of the Oregon Transportation Commission from 1943 to 1950. As I-84 heads east, it also follows US 30 in a majority of I-84 from Portland, Oregon, to near Rupert, Idaho, with splits being variant in Oregon and Idaho, but before leaving Portland, there is a junction with I-205, along with cities Gresham, Fairview, Wood Village and Troutdale.

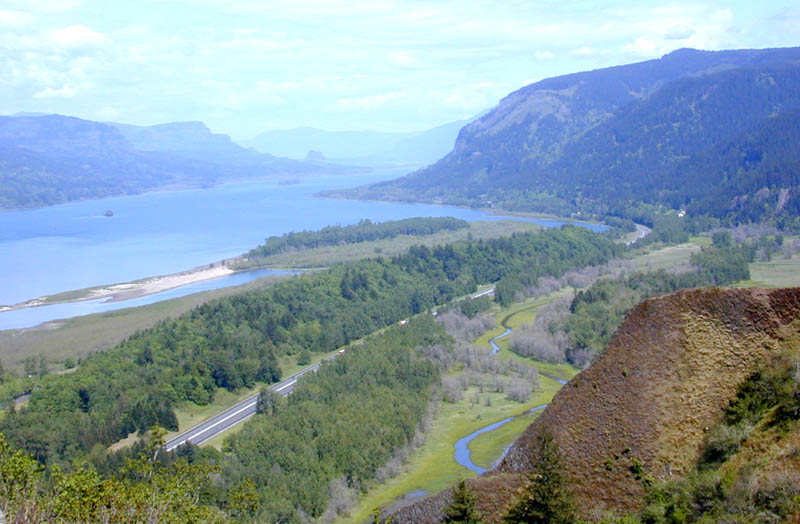
Columbia River Gorge and I-84 as seen from Crown Point, Oregon

Immediately after leaving Troutdale, I-84 and US 30 runs east along the south bank of the Columbia River (and the northern Oregon border, as well) for nearly 150 miles (240 km) with the first 80 miles being in the Columbia River Gorge National Scenic Area, running from Troutdale to the Deschutes River, passing through the cities of Hood River and The Dalles in the Scenic Area. It also passes through Biggs Junction, Rufus, Arlington, and Boardman outside of the Scenic Area before heading southeast to the junction with southern end of I-82 immediately southeast of the Umatilla Chemical Depot near Hermiston. From the junction it continues southeast on to Pendleton.

East of Pendleton, I-84 climbs Emigrant Hill, a 6% grade, into the Blue Mountains. The westbound lanes switchback twice on its descent into Pendleton. Eastbound lanes feature the tightest curves allowed on the Interstate Highway system, even though those curves are on the uphill (eastbound) direction. This grade is also well known because of the distance between eastbound and westbound lanes, nearly 2 miles (3.2 km) between the opposite directions of travel at some points.

The road summits at 4,193 feet (1,278 m) above sea level before descending to the Grand Ronde River and La Grande. It passes by North Powder and Baker City and through the Burnt River canyon. Around Huntington, it crosses into the Mountain Time Zone then briefly follows the southwest bank of the Snake River (Brownlee Reservoir), then continues to Ontario before crossing the Snake River into Idaho.

On March 1, 2016, the speed limit from The Dalles to Ontario was raised to 70 miles per hour (110 km/h), while the truck speed was raised to 65 miles per hour (105 km/h).

=== Idaho ===
I-84 enters Idaho by crossing the Snake River at Ontario, Oregon. From there, it continues on to the major cities of the Treasure Valley (or Boise metropolitan area) including Caldwell, Nampa, Meridian, and Boise (where I-184 connects travelers to downtown). From Boise, I-84 continues southeast passing near several small cities (Mountain Home, Glenns Ferry, and Jerome) on its way to Twin Falls.

Just east of Jerome, I-84 passes within five miles (8.0 km) of Twin Falls, but does not cross the Snake River Canyon or into Twin Falls County. Access to Twin Falls is afforded by an intersection with US 93 at Exit 173; US 93 southbound crosses the Snake River via the Perrine Bridge.

After Twin Falls, I-84 continues through Burley and Heyburn. Approximately seven miles (11 km) east of Declo in rural Cassia County, I-84 meets the western terminus of the western section of I-86. While I-86, along with US 30 heads east, then northeast to American Falls and Pocatello (following the Oregon Trail), I-84 heads southeast to the border with Utah.

In 2014, the speed limit on rural sections of I-84 in Idaho was raised to 80 miles per hour (130 km/h).

=== Utah ===
From Idaho, I-84 enters Utah at a point approximately 7 miles (11.3 km) from Snowville in Box Elder County. It proceeds southeast through Rattle Snake Pass towards Brigham City where I-84 joins I-15 (just west of Tremonton) for its next 40 miles (64 km).

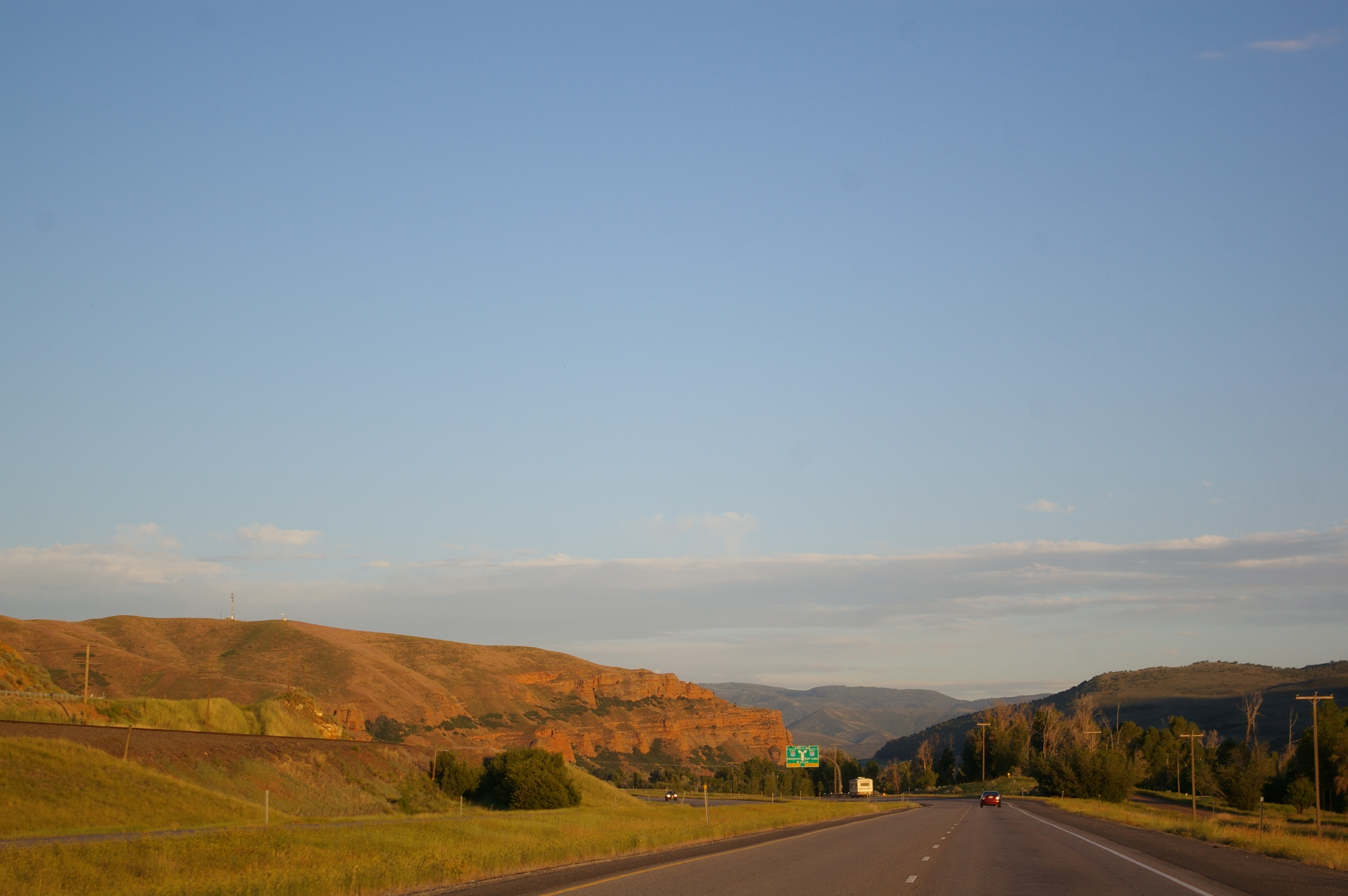
Approaching the eastern terminus of I-84 in Echo, Utah

Just north of Brigham City, at Corinne, Utah, I-84 joins the route of the First transcontinental railroad which the highway follows to its terminus. I-15/I-84 heads south to the cities of the Wasatch Front (Or the Ogden-Clearfield Utah Metropolitan part) passing through several smaller communities and then the west side of Ogden before I-84 separates towards Cheyenne, Wyoming, while I-15 heads to Salt Lake City, I-84 follows the Weber River east.

As the freeway gradually ascends through Weber Canyon it also passes through several small farming communities, including Morgan, where the Browning Arms Company headquarters can be seen from the freeway. Also visible in the canyon is Devil's Slide, an unusual rock formation just off the freeway. Farther up the canyon is the Thousand Mile Tree, planted by Union Pacific Railroad workers to mark 1,000 miles (1,600 km) from the railroad's origin in Omaha, Nebraska.

The freeway ends at Echo, a near ghost town that before served as a stopover for the railroad, at a junction with Interstate 80, to Cheyenne, Wyoming, and US 189, to Jackson, Wyoming. Also near the junction are Echo Reservoir and Echo Dam.

The Utah sections of I-84 that are not concurrent with Interstate 15 are defined at Utah Code Annotated § 72-4-114(4).

== History ==
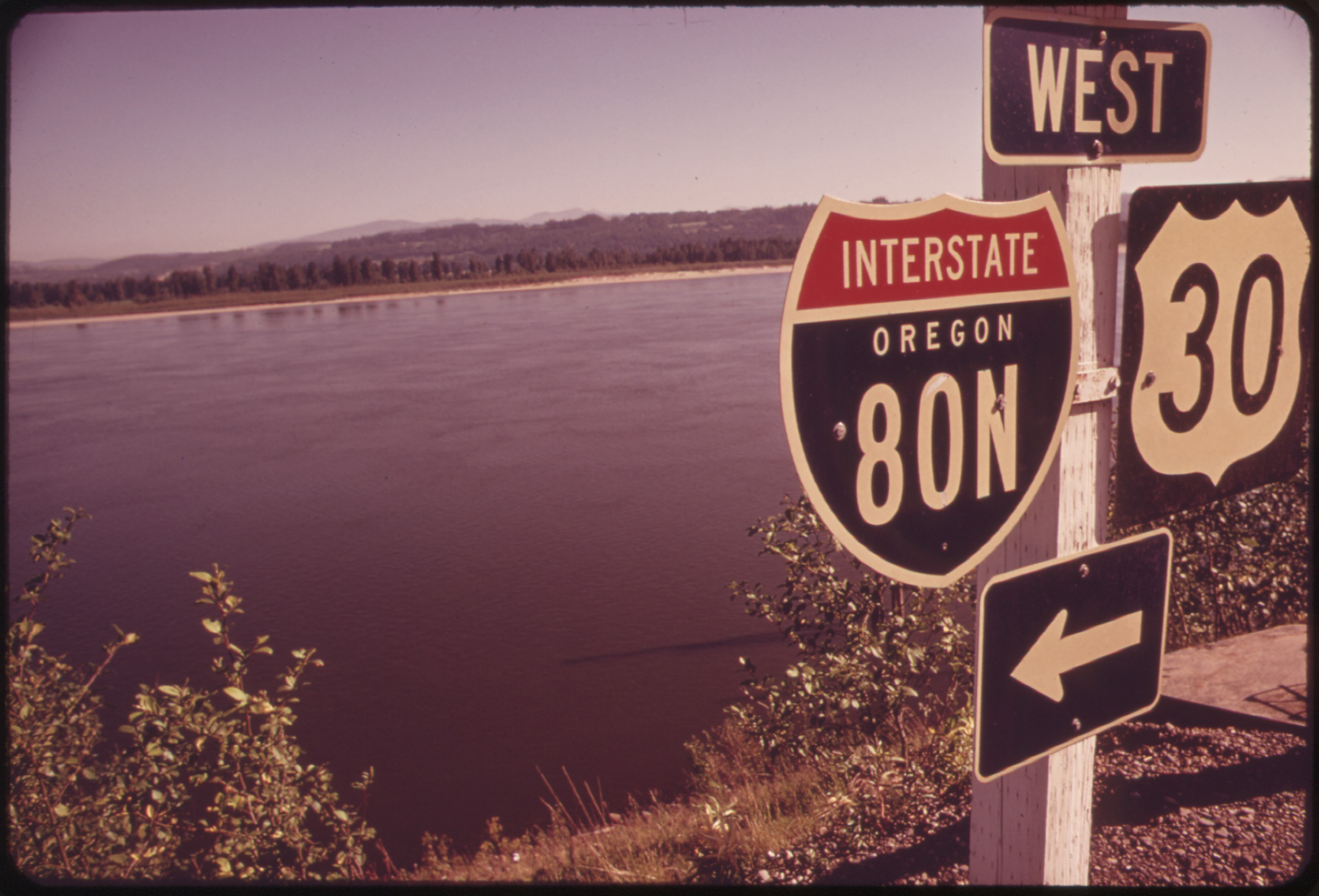
I-84's previous shield, as seen in Corbett, Oregon (May 1973).

The Portland to Utah corridor was proposed as one of the national "toll superhighways" in a 1939 report by the Bureau of Public Roads. It was formally included in the Interstate Highway System, created in 1956, and was originally proposed to be numbered as Interstate 82; however, it was never signed with this designation, and the Interstate 82 designation was later assigned to a different road that connects Ellensburg, Washington, to Yakima, Washington, the Tri-Cities region, and Hermiston, Oregon. The freeway was assigned the designation of I-80N in the 1958 plan, in part to correspond with US 30. The Portland segment of then-I-80N was proposed to run on the Mount Hood Freeway and a section of I-205. Plans for this were officially dropped in 1974 after a successful freeway revolt.

The American Association of State Highway and Transportation Officials established guidelines recommending that "suffixed" highways, such as I-80N, be renumbered. In 1977, Idaho officials recommended that I-80N be renumbered to I-84. The motion was seconded by officials in Utah (who initially proposed this as I-82), but opposed by Oregon and Washington. The motion passed on July 7, 1977, and the states were given until July 1, 1980, to implement a coordinated renumbering strategy. After renumbering, I-84 violated the Interstate Highway Numbering Convention by being south of the modern incarnation of I-82.

== Major intersections ==
All junctions with US 30 are not listed.

Oregon

- I-5 / US 30 in Portland
- I-205 in Portland
- US 30 / US 197 in The Dalles
- US 97 in Biggs Junction
- US 730 near Boardman
- I-82 near Hermiston
- US 395 near Stanfield; joined until Pendleton

Idaho

- US 95 near Fruitland
- US 20 / US 26 near Middleton, joined until Caldwell
- I-184 in Boise
- US 20 / US 26 in Boise; joined until Mountain Home and Bliss respectively
- US 93 near Twin Falls
- I-86 / US 30 near Declo

Utah

- I-15 in Tremonton; joined until Riverdale
- US 91 in Brigham City
- US 89 in South Weber
- I-80 / US 189 in Echo

== Auxiliary routes ==
- Boise, Idaho: I-184

== See also ==
- Business routes of Interstate 84
- Interstate 84 (Pennsylvania–Massachusetts)
