= Interstate 84 in Utah =

Section of Interstate Highway in Utah, United States

Interstate 84
- I-84 highlighted in red

Route information
- Maintained by UDOT
- Length: 117.38 mi (188.90 km)
- Existed: 1977–present
- NHS: Entire route

Major junctions
- West end: I-84 at the Idaho state line near Snowville
- I-15 near Tremonton; US 91 in Brigham City; I-15 in Riverdale; US 89 in Uintah
- East end: I-80 near Echo

Location
- Country: United States
- State: Utah
- Counties: Box Elder, Weber, Davis, Morgan, Summit

Highway system
- Interstate Highway System; Main; Auxiliary; Suffixed; Business; Future; Utah State Highway System; Interstate; US; State; Minor; Scenic
← SR-83	→ SR-85

Interstate 84 (I-84) is a part of the Interstate Highway System that links Portland, Oregon, to I-80 near Echo, Utah. The 117.38-mile-long (188.90 km) segment in the US state of Utah is the shortest of any of the three states the western I-84 passes through and contains the eastern terminus of the highway. I-84 enters Box Elder County near Snowville before becoming concurrent with I-15 in Tremonton. The concurrent highways travel south through Brigham City and Ogden and separate near Ogden-Hinckley Airport. Turning east along the Davis County border, I-84 intersects US Route 89 (US-89) and enters Weber Canyon as well as Morgan County. While in Morgan County, I-84 passes the Devil's Gate-Weber Hydroelectric Power Plant and Devil's Slide rock formation. Past Morgan, the highway crosses into Summit County, past the Thousand Mile Tree before reaching its eastern terminus at I-80 near Echo.

Construction of the controlled-access highway was scheduled in late 1957 under the designations Interstate 82S (I-82S) and Interstate 80N (I-80N). The I-82S designation was only applied on paper for about a year, but the I-80N designation was the highway's official designation until 1977 when it was renumbered I-84 by the American Association of State Highway and Transportation Officials (AASHTO). By 1986, construction of the freeway had been completed across the three states. Average traffic in 2012, along the non-concurrent parts of I-84, ranged from as few as 6,655 vehicles traveling along I-84 at the interchange with State Route 86 (SR-86) in Henefer, and as many as 18,945 vehicles used the highway at the SR-26 interchange in Riverdale.

== Route description ==
Out of the three states that the western portion of I-84 passes through, the 117.38-mile-long (188.90 km) segment in Utah is the shortest. By comparison, the longest stretch of western I-84 through a single state is the 375.17-mile-long (603.78 km) segment in Oregon. I-84 also has a noncontiguous eastern segment that passes through Pennsylvania, New York, Connecticut, and Massachusetts: all four of these segments are shorter than the Utah segment.

Every year, the Utah Department of Transportation (UDOT) conducts a series of surveys on its highways in the state to measure traffic volume. This is expressed in terms of annual average daily traffic (AADT), a measure of traffic volume for any average day of the year. In 2012, UDOT calculated that as few as 6,655 vehicles traveled I-84 at the interchange with SR-86 in Henefer, and as many as 18,945 vehicles used the highway at the SR-26 interchange in Riverdale. Between 27 and 57 percent of the traffic recorded consisted of trucks. These counts are of the portion of the freeway in Utah and are not reflective of the entire Interstate or of its concurrency with I-15. As part of the Interstate Highway System, the entire route is listed on the National Highway System, a system of roads that are important to the nation's economy, defense, and mobility.

=== Western segment ===
Crossing the Idaho–Utah state line, I-84 enters Box Elder County and the Curlew Valley near farmland that utilizes center-pivot irrigation before intersecting SR-30 at a diamond interchange. The town of Snowville is crossed before passing to the north of the Hansel Mountains and the North Promontory Mountains. The town of Howell, accessible from an interchange with SR-83, lays to the southeast of Blue Creek Reservoir in the Blue Creek Valley. Access to Golden Spike National Historical Park is provided by SR-83 south of Howell. The Blue Spring Hills form the southern border of Howell as I-84 continues southeast. Additional center irrigation farmland is passed before giving way to more traditional farmland outside of the city of Tremonton, where a trumpet interchange marks where I-15 turns north towards Malad City and Pocatello. Heading southeast from this interchange, I-84 and I-15 are concurrent for just over 38 miles (61 km).

=== Concurrency with I-15 ===
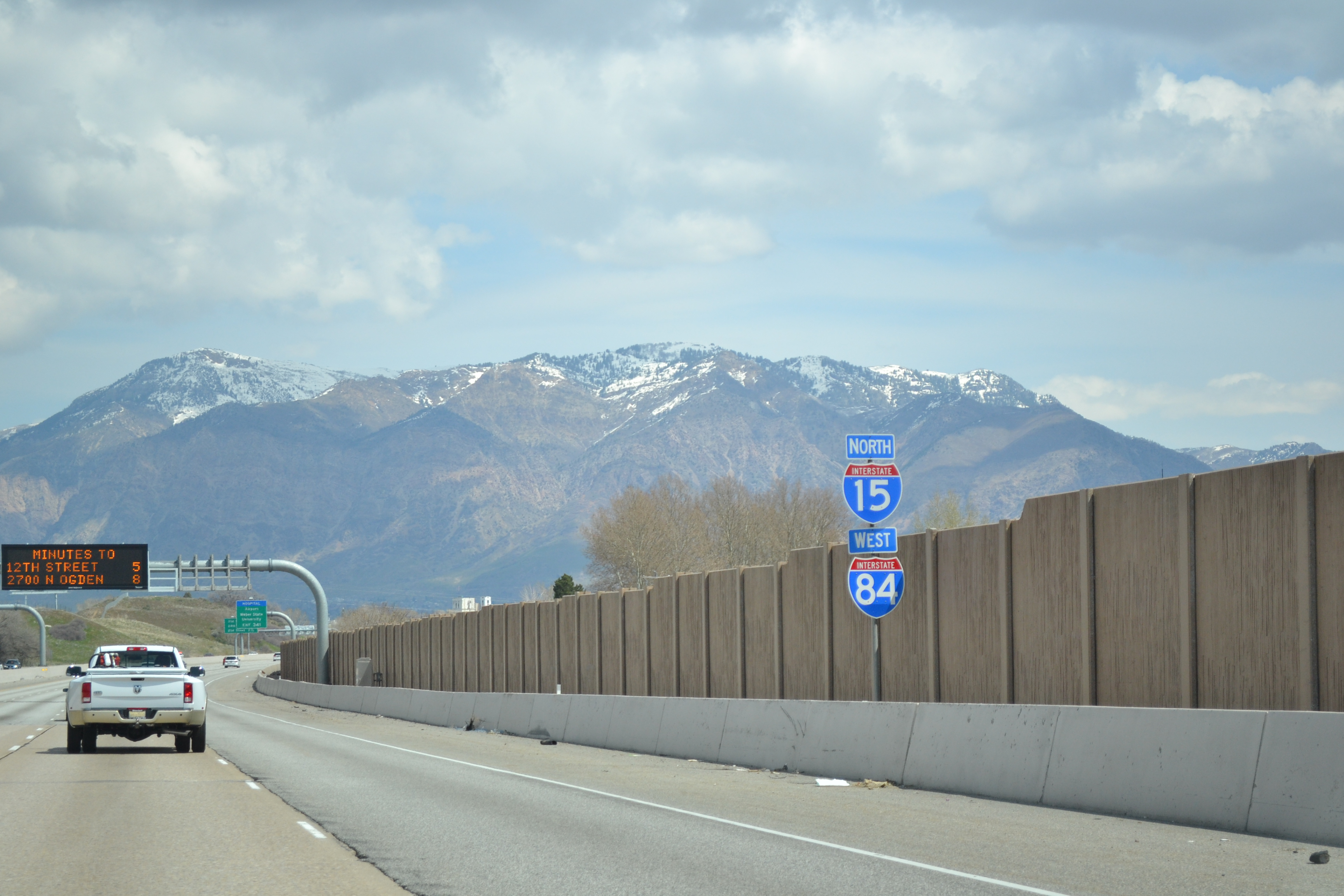
Northbound along I-15/I-84 in Ogden

Concurrent highways I-15/I-84 continue south, parallel to rail belonging to the Union Pacific Railroad past the Wellsville Mountain Wilderness, to an interchange at 1100 West in Brigham City, also known as US-91, which, once in Brigham City, becomes concurrent with US-89 and the two highways travel northeast from Brigham City into Box Elder Canyon toward Logan in the heart of the Cache Valley. US-89 closely parallels I-15/I-84 east, as the highways pass Willard Bay, Willard Bay State Park, and Bear River Migratory Bird Refuge before crossing into Weber County.

Upon entering Weber County, the rail line that the highway has paralleled since Tremonton splits off eastward near Defense Depot Ogden, as the concurrent highways continue south past Farr West and Marriott-Slaterville before a Southern Pacific Railroad rail line, which traverses the Great Salt Lake on a causeway, crosses under the freeway. The city of Ogden is bypassed by the Interstates, with US-89 serving downtown. US-89 is accessible via interchanges with SR-39, SR-79, and SR-104 in addition to I-84 further southeast. I-84 splits from I-15 at the south end of Ogden-Hinckley Airport, with I-15 continuing south toward Salt Lake City and Provo.

=== Eastern segment ===
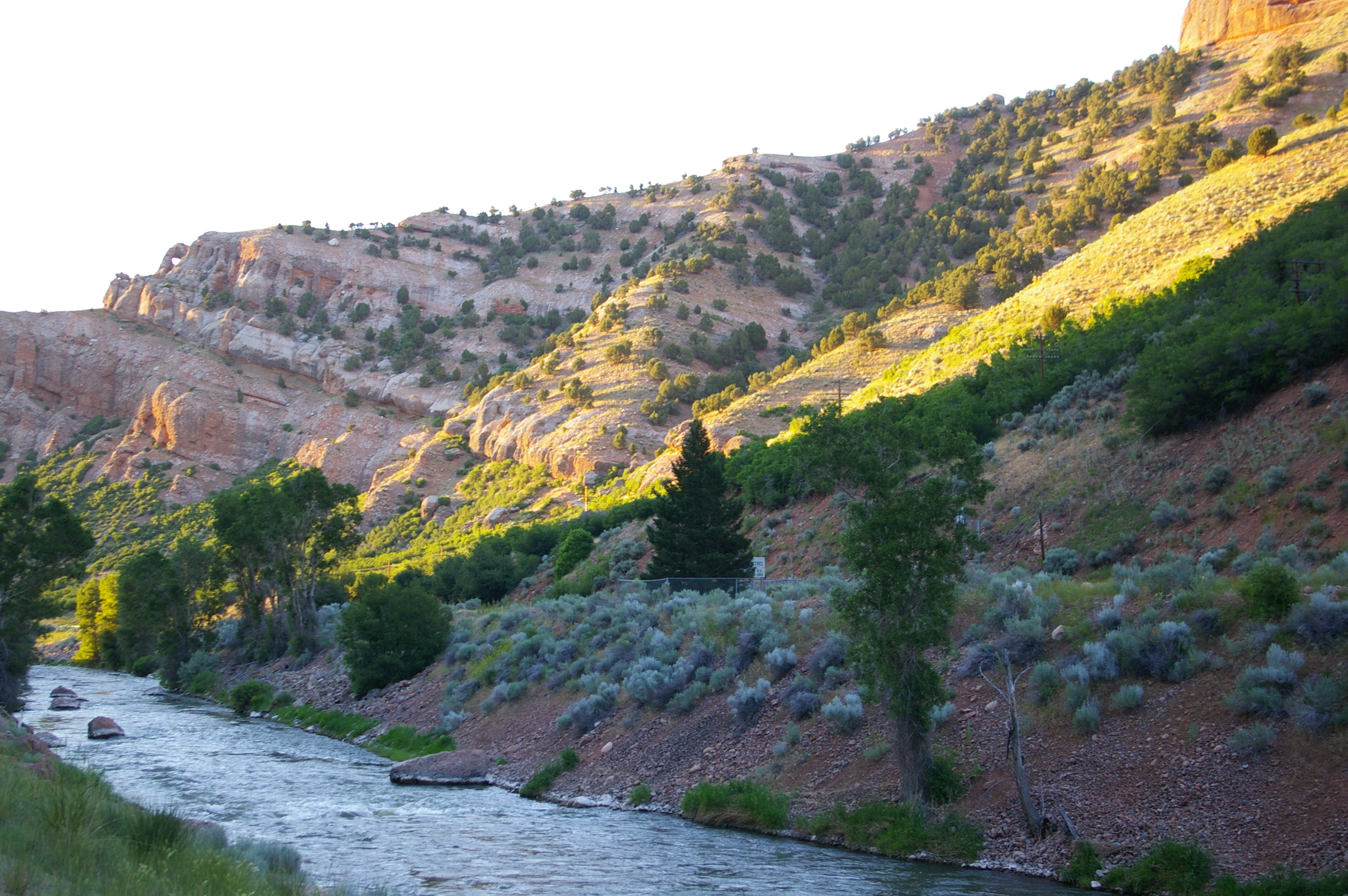
Thousand Mile Tree

Splitting from I-15 near Roy, I-84 passes between Hill Air Force Base, which is to the south of the highway, and Washington Terrace before clipping the extreme northern portions of Davis County. While in Davis County, I-84 intersects 475 East, also known as the Adams Avenue Parkway, before coming to a hybrid partial cloverleaf/half diamond interchange with US-89 along the Davis–Weber county line.

I-84 follows the Weber River into Weber Canyon, Morgan County, and Wasatch–Cache National Forest. Once in the canyon, the carriageways of the highway split to accommodate the Devil's Gate-Weber Hydroelectric Power Plant. Following the river south, I-84 exits the forest and enters the county seat of Morgan. Leaving the city the highway turns back east, passing Devil's Slide, an unusual rock formation just off the freeway.

Upon entering Summit County, I-84 passes Thousand Mile Tree, planted by Union Pacific Railroad workers to mark the construction of 1,000 miles (1,600 km) of rail from its origin in Omaha, Nebraska. The tree was said to be the only pine tree between Omaha and Salt Lake City. Another tree was planted as the original tree had died in 1900 and was removed in 1926 to during the conversion from single-track to double-track through the canyon. Past the tree, the freeway passes through the town of Henefer before terminating at a directional T interchange with I-80 just south of the census-designated place of Echo. Immediately south of the interchange is Echo Reservoir and Echo Dam.

== History ==
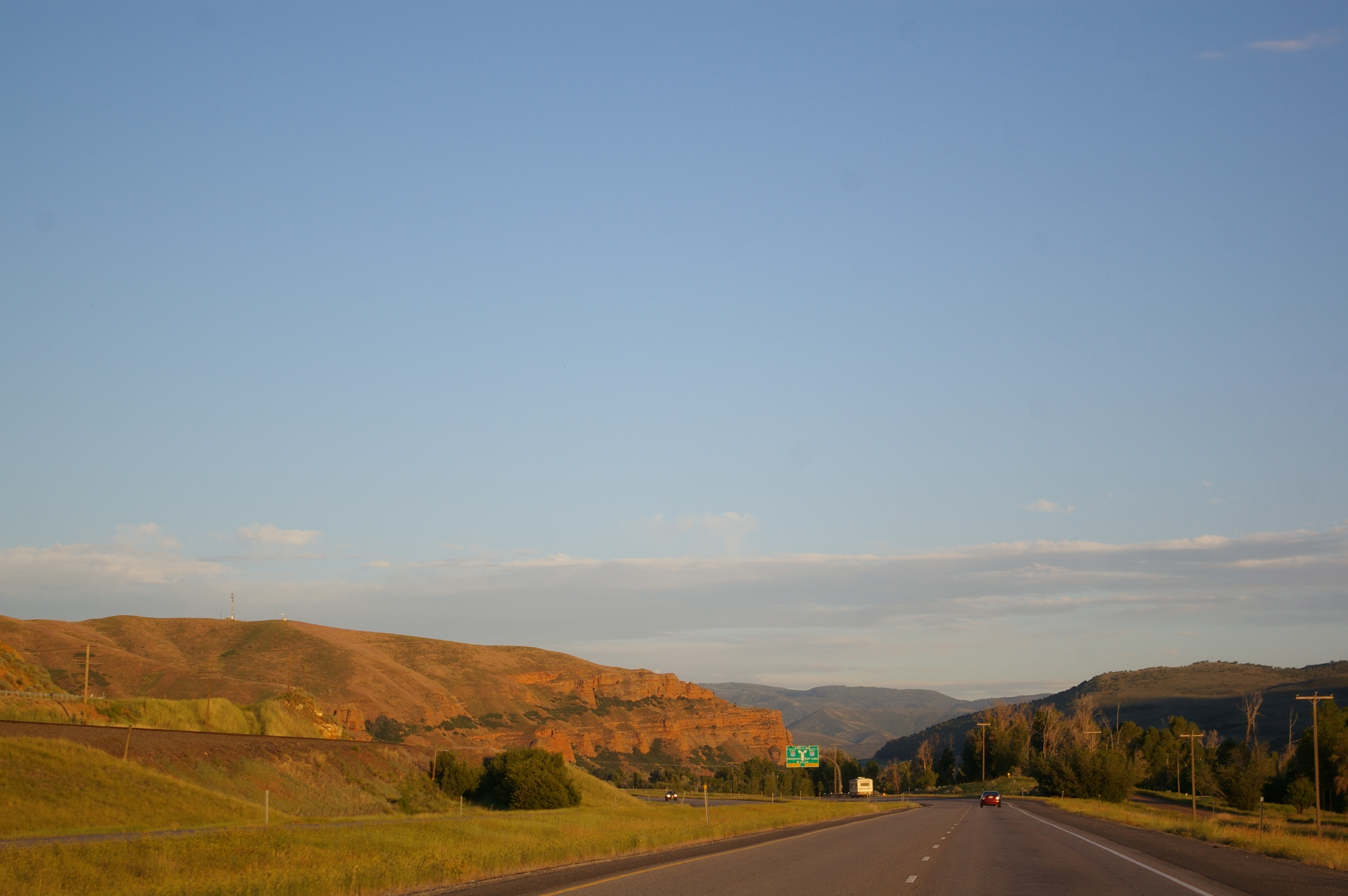
I-84 approaching its eastern terminus

=== Earlier roads ===
Most of the original routing of what is now I-84 existed as early as 1923; however, the portion of now I-84 into Idaho was not yet constructed. In 1926, much of the route was signed as US-30S, from the now eastern terminus at I-80 (US-530 then), northwest into Ogden. Between Ogden and Brigham City, the highway was to be concurrent with US-91, then US-30S split off northwest to the Idaho border. The entire western branch of US-30S was an unimproved road; however, the concurrency into Ogden was paved. The remainder of the route to its now terminus was mostly graded with a few improved sections, and, by 1937, the entire route was paved.

=== Current road ===
The first Utah state route to have the number 84 is what is now known as SR-126. SR-126 was originally numbered SR-84 until the 1977 Utah state route renumbering. Previously, the freeway's legislative designation was SR-3. Like the other two main Interstate Highways in Utah, I-15 (Veterans Memorial Highway) and I-80 (Purple Heart Trail), I-84 has also been given a special name of "Vietnam Veterans Memorial Highway". House Bill HB275, sponsored by Utah Representative Justin Fawson, North Ogden, authorizing the name designation was signed into law by Utah Governor Gary Herbert on March 30, 2015. The highway loosely follows the path of the first transcontinental railroad. The original routing of US-30S had the highway passing into Idaho west of Black Pine Peak; however, the new I-84 was constructed to the east. The original roadways are now numbered SR-30, SR-42 and Idaho State Highway 2847.

Interstate 80N
- Location: Idaho state line to Echo
- Existed: 1958–1977

Passage of the Federal-Aid Highway Act of 1956 formed the Interstate Highway System; however, only the western segment of now I-84 was approved at this time, and a designation of I-82S was assigned to a then unconstructed controlled-access highway across Box Elder County in 1957. The eastern segment of the highway was added later in 1957, and the route was numbered I-80N by 1958. By 1968, portions of the western half of the freeway had been completed, along with the segment between Tremonton and Brigham City. A portion of the freeway was completed around Morgan as well. By 1971, most of the western portions of the freeway had been constructed with two sections remaining that had at-grade intersections. Along the concurrency, there were gaps between Brigham City and Pleasant View and one small gap near the Devil's Slide.

The I-80N designation was changed to I-84 in 1977 by the AASHTO, over objections from the Washington State Department of Transportation and the Idaho Transportation Department, and with the support of UDOT and the Oregon Department of Transportation. By 1978, construction of I-84 was complete across most of the three states. In September 1986, the final section of the highway was opened on the 11 miles (18 km) from Tremonton to Blue Creek Summit, following three years of construction that cost $21 million (equivalent to $50.8 million in 2024).

In 1994, I-84 was planned to be used to transport low-level radioactive waste from Idaho National Laboratory to the Waste Isolation Pilot Plant in Carlsbad, New Mexico, via Wyoming. This did not start until 1999 however due to the delay in the opening of the New Mexican plant. A $20-million (equivalent to $35.8 million in 2024) reconstruction of the US-89 interchange at the mouth of Weber Canyon was financed partly by the funding obtained by the state in preparation for the 2002 Winter Olympics in 1998 and was scheduled to begin in 2000. Reconstruction of a 10-mile-long (16 km) segment of I-84 between Mountain Green and Morgan was done between 2004 and 2005 at a cost of $19 million (equivalent to $30.2 million in 2024). One of the sub-contractors on the job was found guilty of lying about sub-par work done on installation of roadside impact absorbers along this stretch.

== Exit list ==
County	Location	mi	km	Exit	Destinations	Notes
Box Elder		0.000	0.000		I-84 west – Boise	Continuation into Idaho
Box Elder		4.660	7.500	5	SR-30 west – Park Valley	West end of SR-30 overlap; former US-30S
Box Elder	Snowville	7.125	11.467	7	Snowville	
Box Elder		11.978	19.277	12	Ranch Exit	
Box Elder		15.808	25.441	16	Hansel Valley	
Box Elder		17.385	27.978	17	Rattlesnake Pass	
Box Elder		20.317	32.697	20	Blue Creek	
Box Elder		24.457	39.360	24	Pocatello Valley	
Box Elder	Howell	26.567	42.755	26	SR-83 south – Howell, ATK	Access to Golden Spike National Historic Site
Box Elder		32.414	52.165	32	Whites Valley Road	Formerly signed as "Ranch Exit"
Box Elder		39.508	63.582	39	Garland, Bothwell	
Box Elder	Bothwell Junction	40.824	65.700	40	SR-102 – Tremonton, Bothwell	
Box Elder		42.012	67.612	41	I-15 north – Pocatello	West end of I-15 overlap; signed as exit 379 westbound
I-84 overlaps Interstate 15 for 38.309 mi (61.652 km)
Weber	Riverdale	81.043	130.426		I-15 south – Salt Lake City	East end of I-15 overlap; I-15 exit 340; westbound access via exit 81
Weber	Riverdale	81.727	131.527	81	SR-26 (Riverdale Road) to I-15 south – Riverdale	
Davis	Uintah	84.594	136.141	85	Adams Avenue	Adams Avenue is a private toll road here
Weber	Uintah Junction	87.771	141.254	87	US 89 – South Ogden, Salt Lake City, Ogden	Signed as exits 87A (south) and 87B (north) westbound
Morgan		91.240	146.837	Rest area (eastbound)		
Morgan		92.339	148.605	92	SR-167 north – Mountain Green, Huntsville	Eastbound exit and westbound entrance
Morgan		93.904	151.124	Rest area (westbound)		
Morgan		96.504	155.308	96	Stoddard, Peterson	
Morgan	Morgan	103.333	166.298	103	SR-66 – Morgan	
Morgan		106.173	170.869	106	Rees Lane	Formerly signed as "Ranch Exit"
Morgan		108.272	174.247	108	Taggart	
Morgan		111.313	179.141	111	Croydon	Former SR-158
Morgan		110.761	178.253	Devil's Slide View Area		
Summit		112.739	181.436	112	SR-86 east – Henefer	
Summit	Henefer	115.399	185.717	115	SR-65 south – Henefer, Echo	
Summit		119.773	192.756	120	I-80 (US 189) – Salt Lake City, Cheyenne	I-80 exit 168; signed as exits 120A (east) and 120B (west); eastern terminus; semi-directional T interchange
1.000 mi = 1.609 km; 1.000 km = 0.621 mi: Concurrency terminus; Incomplete access

== See also ==
Interstate 84
Previous state: Idaho	Utah	Next state: Terminus
