= Bonneville High School =

Bonneville High School can refer to:

- Bonneville High School (Idaho Falls, Idaho)
- Bonneville High School (Washington Terrace, Utah)
