= Thousand Mile Tree =

Coordinates: 41.053055°N 111.529238°W

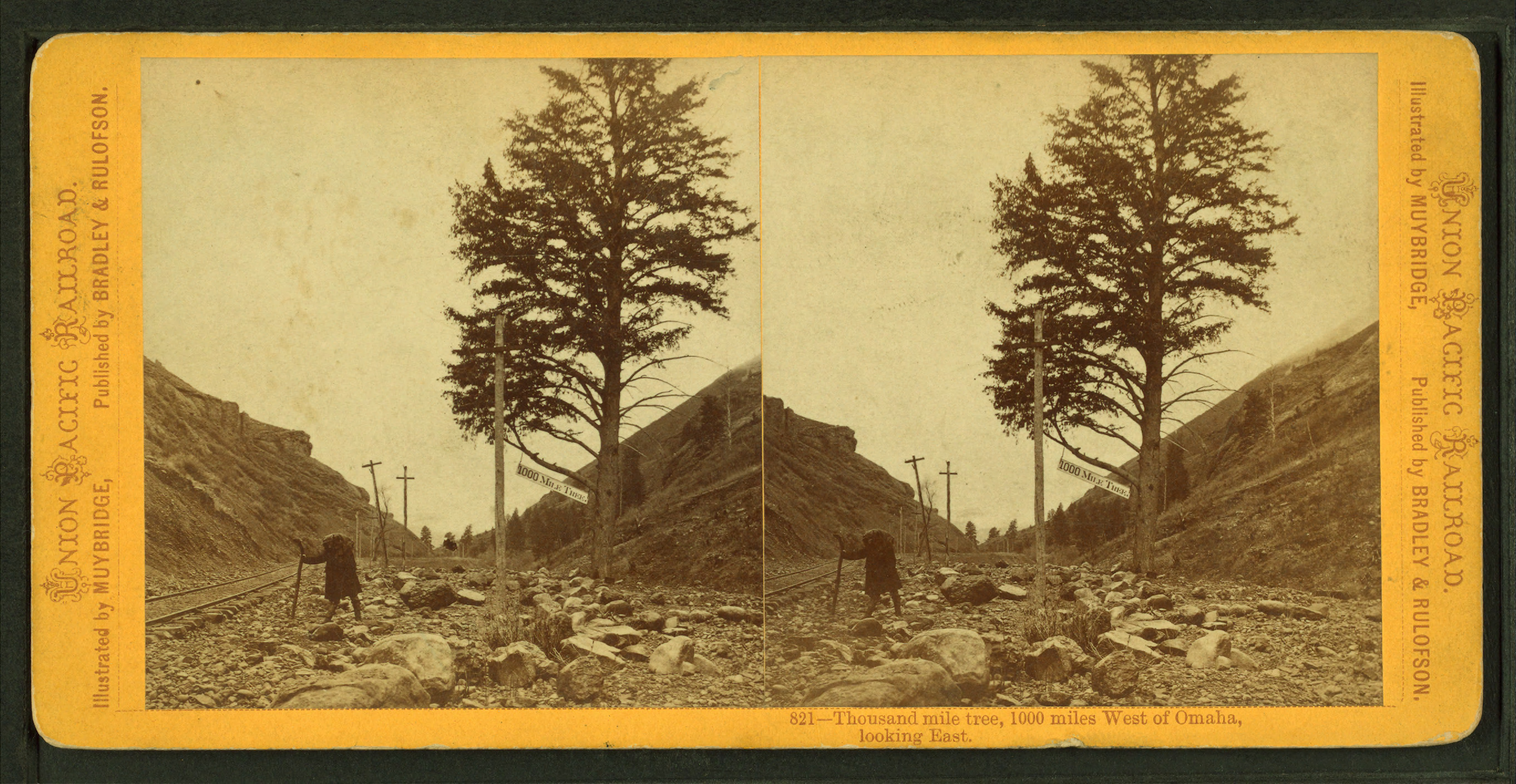
The Thousand Mile Tree Muybridge #821 (c1870)

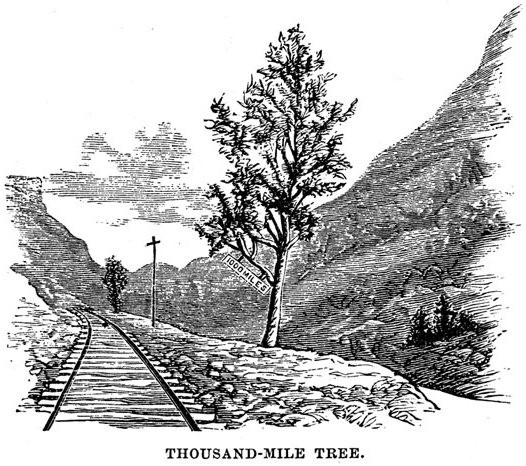
Griggs Engraving (1878)

Thousand Mile Tree is a pine tree located in Weber Canyon near the community of Henefer, Utah along the Overland Route of the Union Pacific Railroad. In January 1869, graders of the railroad found a similar tree standing next to the line they were constructing, which by coincidence marked the western progress of exactly one thousand miles of road from Omaha, Nebraska/Council Bluffs, Iowa, the eastern terminus of the First transcontinental railroad.

The original Thousand Mile Tree was found standing along the Weber River, adjacent to the under-construction grade of the westbound Union Pacific section of the transcontinental line in what is known as Wilhelmina's Pass, at an elevation of 5,257 feet (1,602 m) above sea level. According to Utah rail historian and writer Don Strack, in his article Eastbound To Wahsatch—Union Pacific's Route Through Weber and Echo Canyons, about one week following 15 January 1869, the “tracks reached the site of a large tree, 90 feet (27 m) tall, that happened to be exactly 1,000 miles from Omaha, and soon a sign was hung from the tree clearly stating that fact.

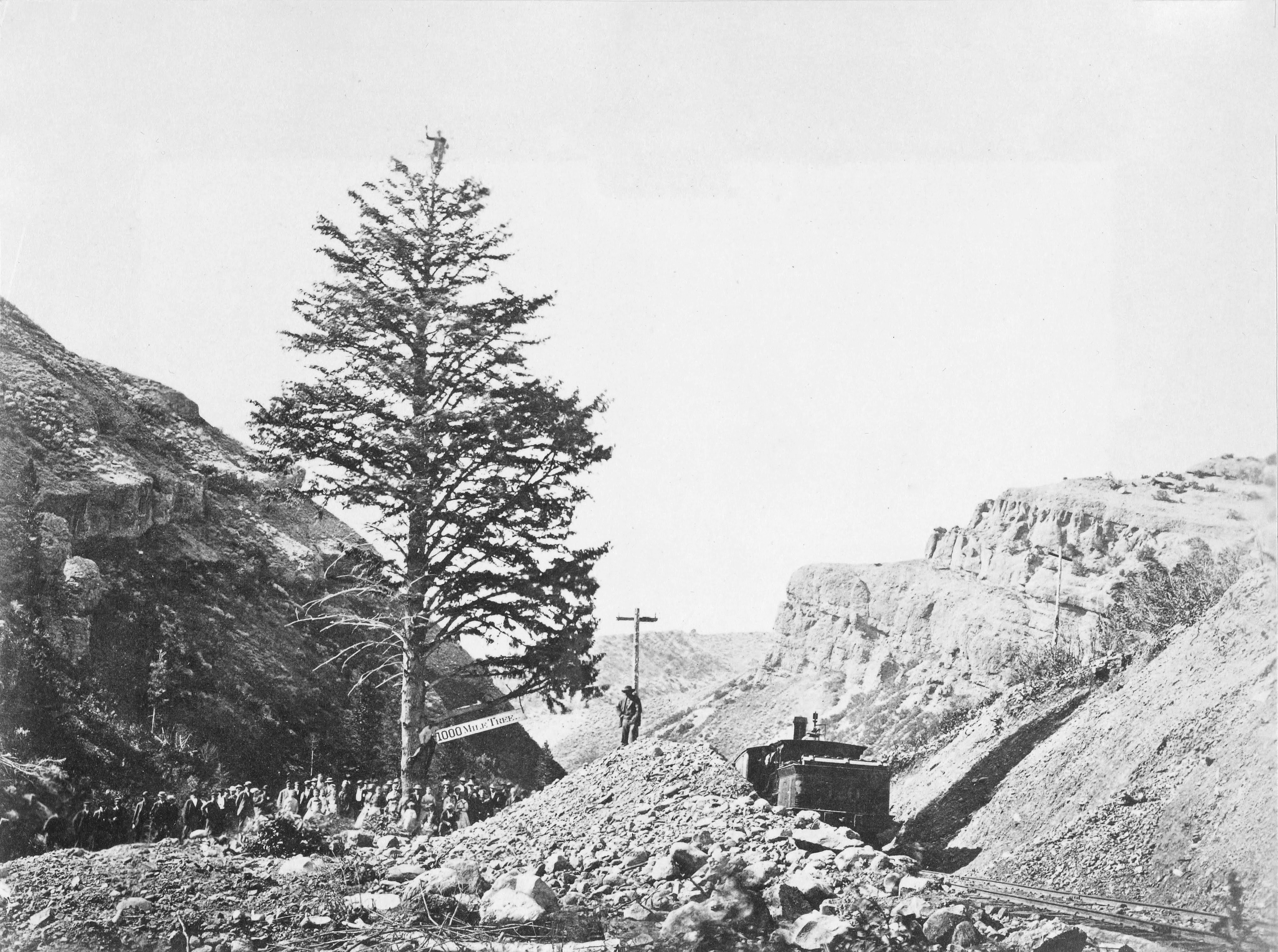
The Thousand Mile Tree by A.J. Russell (1869)

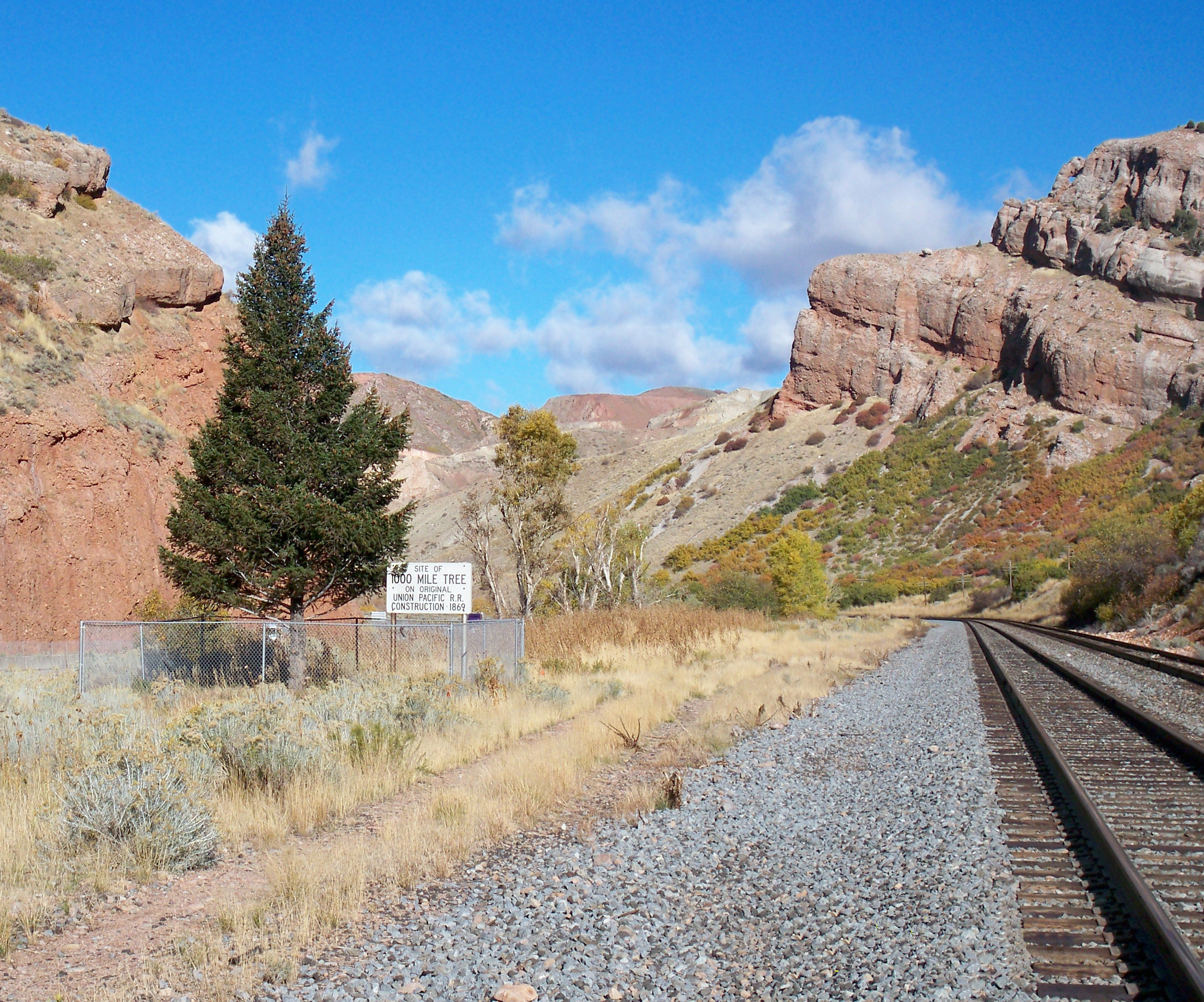
The UPRR's replacement Thousand Mile Tree (2011).

"The tree was in the middle of a gorge between Henefer in the Upper Weber Valley and Devil’s Slide, a unique geological formation of twin limestone ridges running vertically from the canyon floor. Along with the Thousand Mile Tree, Devil's Slide immediately became a sight to be seen by all passing trains. The gorge just east of Devil’s Slide was named Wilhelmina's Pass and was the subject of several views by Union Pacific’s official photographer A. J. Russell for his stereographic tour of the new line. Although the gorge was changed significantly to accommodate today’s Interstate 84, most early trains stopped to allow passengers to appreciate the landmark, and several excursion trains from Ogden were arranged to see Wilhelmina's Pass, the Thousand Mile Tree, and Devil’s Slide.”

By 1900, the original Thousand Mile Tree had died and it was removed in September of that year. Later modifications to the line reduced the mileage at that point from 1000 miles to 959.66 miles (1,544.42 km), but in 1982, Union Pacific planted a new tree to commemorate the site. This particular tree stands today within a special fenced enclosure along the original transcontinental line, where it has grown to over 30 feet (9.1 m) tall.

In 2016 a drawing of the "Thousand Mile Tree" by Jim Stitt was featured on the label artwork of the 42nd annual "Our Special Ale" brewed by Anchor Brewing.
