= Croydon, Utah =

Unincorporated community in the state of Utah, United States

- Unincorporated community
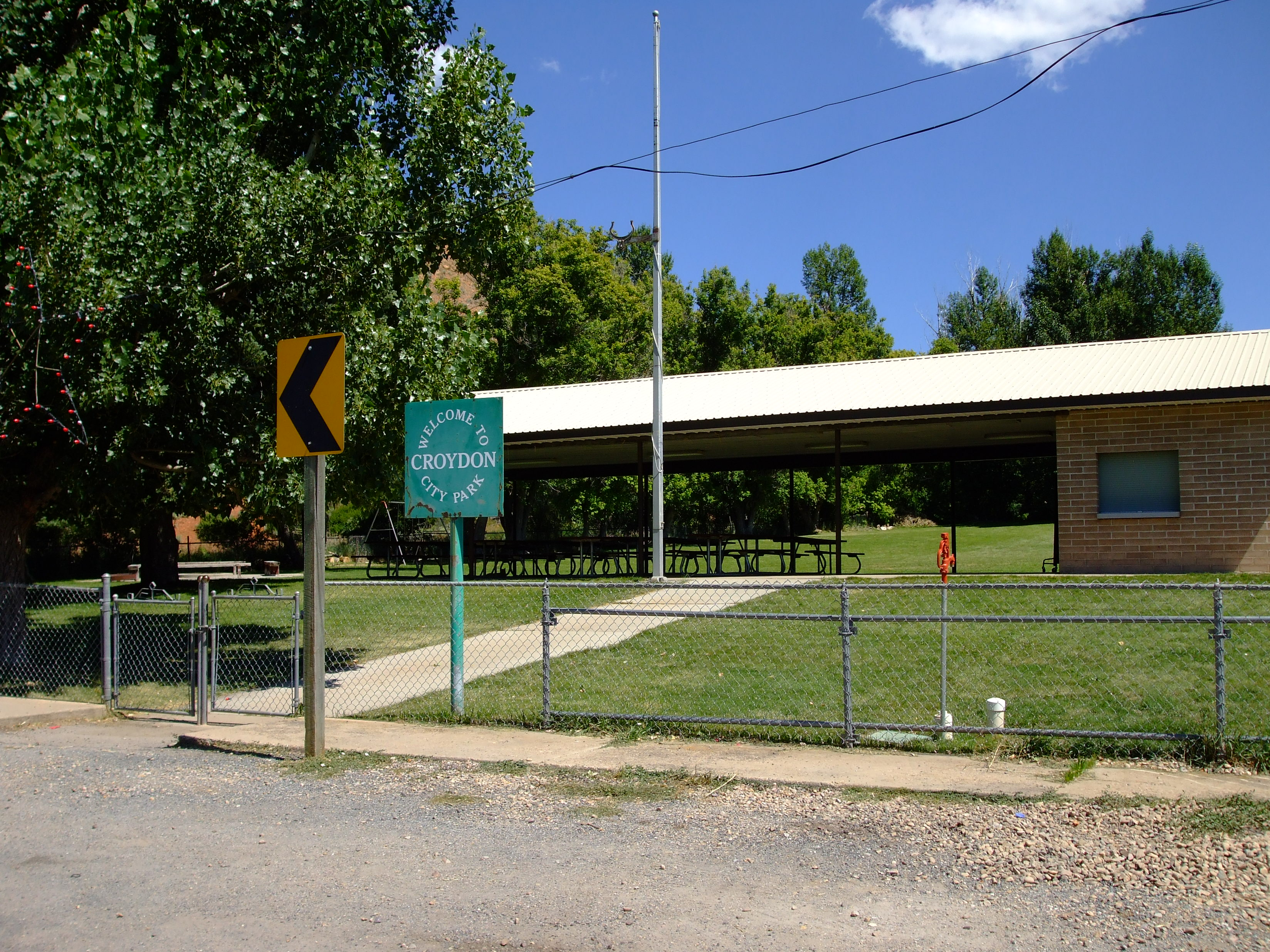
- Croydon "City" Park, August 2008

- Location of Croydon within the State of Utah Croydon (the United States)
- Coordinates: 41°04′07″N 111°30′50″W
- Country: United States
- State: Utah
- County: Morgan
- Settled: 1862
- Named after: Croydon
- Elevation: 5,344 ft (1,629 m)
- Time zone: UTC-7 (Mountain (MST))
  - Summer (DST): UTC-6 (MDT)
- ZIP codes: 84018
- Area code: 435
- GNIS feature ID: 1427128

Croydon is an unincorporated community in northeastern Morgan County, Utah, United States. It is part of the Ogden–Clearfield, Utah Metropolitan Statistical Area.

== Description ==
Accessible from Interstate 84, it is home to Holcim's Devil's Slide Cement Plant and several hundred residents. Lost Creek runs through this small unincorporated town, just northeast of the Devil's Slide rock formation. Cattle and sheep ranches can be found throughout the valley and in the surrounding mountains. Croydon was also home to the annual Widowmaker, a snowmobile and motorcycle hillclimbing contest founded in 1964.

Croydon was originally called Lost Creek, and under the latter name was founded in 1862. The present name is after Croydon, in England, the native land of a large share of the first settlers.

Historical population
Census	Pop.	Note	%±
1880	248		—
1890	240		−3.2%
1900	185		−22.9%
1910	539		191.4%
1920	392		−27.3%
1930	441		12.5%
1940	357		−19.0%
1950	279		−21.8%
Source: U.S. Census Bureau
