= Ogden–Clearfield metropolitan area =

Metropolitan area in Utah, United States of America

Coordinates: 41°08′N 111°55′W

Ogden, UT Metropolitan Statistical Area
- Metropolitan Statistical Area
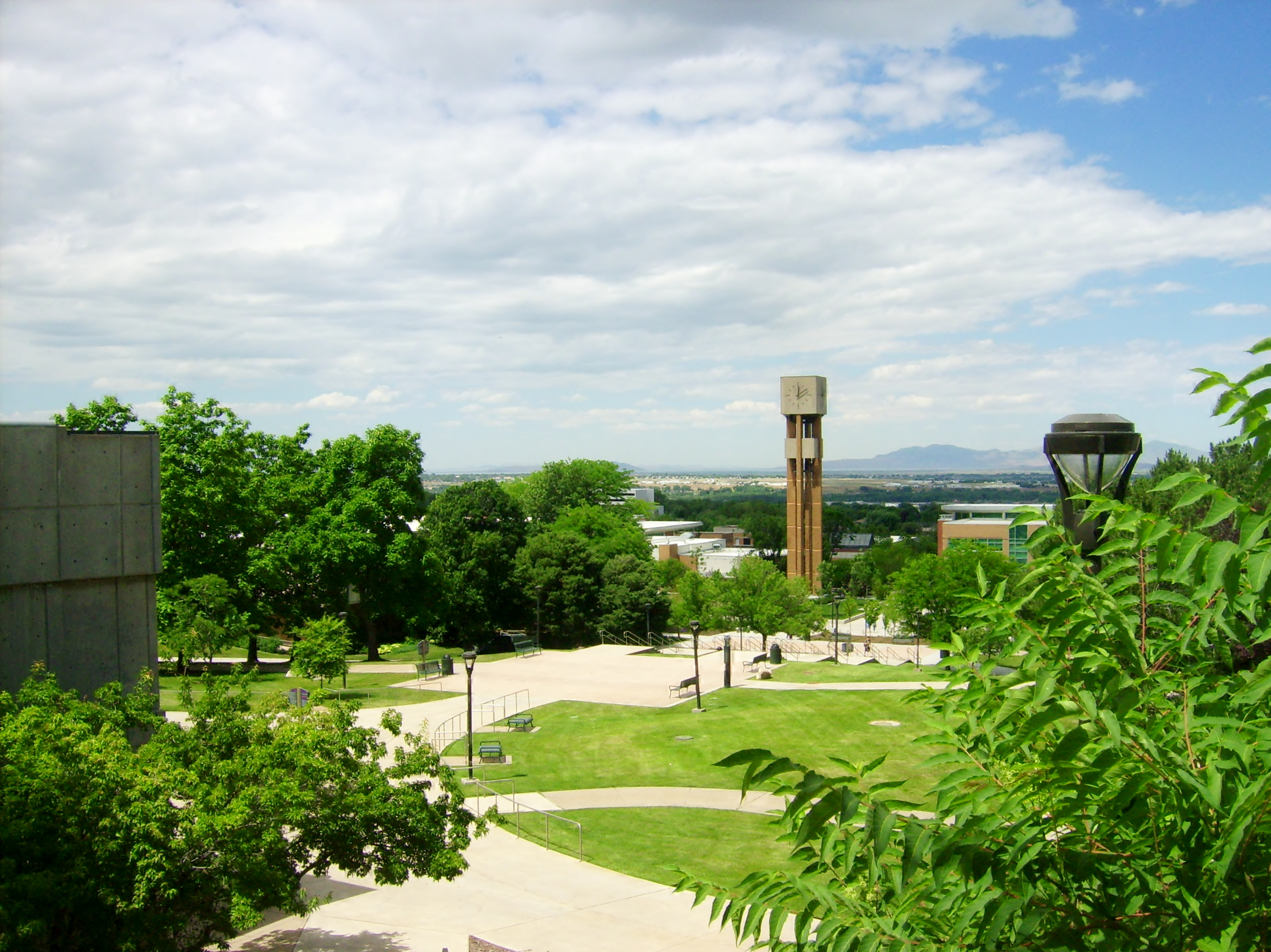
- Weber State University's main campus in Ogden
Map of Salt Lake City–Provo–Orem, UT–ID CSA
Salt Lake City–Murray, UT MSA
Provo–Orem–Lehi, UT MSA
Ogden, UT MSA
Heber, UT μSA
Brigham City, UT-ID μSA
- Country: United States
- State: Utah
- Largest city: Ogden
- Other principal cities: - Bountiful; - Clearfield; - Clinton; - Farmington; - Kaysville; - Layton; - Morgan; - North Ogden; - North Salt Lake; - Roy; - Syracuse

Area
  - Total: 1,544.9 sq mi (4,001 km^{2})

Population (2020 census)
  - Total: 637,197
  - Estimate (2026): 682,803 ▲
  - Density: 412.45/sq mi (159.25/km^{2})

GDP
  - Total: $39.168 billion (2022)
- Time zone: UTC−7 (MST)
  - Summer (DST): UTC−6 (MDT)

The Ogden, UT Metropolitan Statistical Area, as defined by the United States Office of Management and Budget (OMB), is an area consisting of three counties in northern Utah, anchored by the cities of Ogden and Clearfield. As of the 2020 census, the MSA had a population of 637,197. On February 28, 2013, the OMB released a bulletin Revising delineations of CSAs and MSAs, which led to the addition of Box Elder County to the Ogden Metropolitan Statistical Area. On July 21, 2023, Box Elder County was moved to the newly created Brigham City micropolitan statistical area.

== Counties ==
The Ogden MSA is part of the Wasatch Front and is coterminous with Davis, Morgan, and Weber counties. Its three counties contain a mixture of suburban development outside of Salt Lake City and uninhabitable, federally owned mountainous land.

County	Seat	2025 estimate	2020 Census	Change	Land area	Density
Davis	Farmington	381,227	362,679	+5.11%	299 sq mi (770 km^{2})	1,275/sq mi (492/km^{2})
Weber	Ogden	278,174	262,223	+6.08%	576 sq mi (1,490 km^{2})	483/sq mi (186/km^{2})
Morgan	Morgan	13,383	12,295	+8.85%	609 sq mi (1,580 km^{2})	22/sq mi (8/km^{2})
Total		672,784	637,197	+5.58%	1,484 sq mi (3,840 km^{2})	453/sq mi (175/km^{2})

== Communities ==
- Bear River City
- Bountiful
- Brigham City
- Centerville
- Clearfield
- Clinton
- Corinne
- Croydon (unincorporated)
- Deweyville
- Eden (unincorporated)
- Elwood
- Farmington
- Farr West
- Fielding
- Fruit Heights
- Garland
- Harrisville
- Honeyville
- Hooper
- Howell
- Huntsville
- Kaysville
- Layton
- Liberty (unincorporated)
- Mantua
- Marriott-Slaterville
- Monte Verde (unincorporated)
- Morgan
- Mountain Green (unincorporated)
- Nordic Valley (unincorporated)
- North Ogden
- North Salt Lake
- Ogden
- Perry
- Peterson (unincorporated)
- Plain City
- Pleasant View
- Plymouth
- Portage
- Reese (unincorporated)
- Richville (unincorporated)
- Riverdale
- Roy
- Snowville
- South Ogden
- South Weber
- Stoddard (unincorporated)
- Sunset
- Syracuse
- Taylor (unincorporated)
- Tremonton
- Uintah
- Warren (unincorporated)
- Washington Terrace
- West Bountiful
- West Haven
- West Point
- West Weber (unincorporated)
- Willard
- Woods Cross

== Demographics ==
As of the census of 2000, there were 442,646 people, 138,945 households, and 110,557 families residing within the MSA. The racial makeup of the MSA was 90.32% White, 1.21% African American, 0.66% Native American, 1.40% Asian, 0.22% Pacific Islander, 4.17% from other races, and 2.02% from two or more races. Hispanic or Latino of any race were 8.57% of the population.

The median income for a household in the MSA was $49,338, and the median income for a family was $53,806. Males had a median income of $39,834 versus $24,553 for females. The per capita income for the MSA was $18,479.

== See also ==
- Utah census statistical areas
- Wasatch Front
