= Mason Unck =

American football player (born 1980)

No. 53
- Position: Linebacker

Personal information
- Born: March 3, 1980 (age 46); Ogden, Utah
- Listed height: 6 ft 3 in (1.91 m)
- Listed weight: 238 lb (108 kg)

Career information
- High school: Bonneville
- College: Arizona State
- NFL draft: 2003: undrafted

Career history
- Cleveland Browns (2003–2006)
- Stats at Pro Football Reference

Mason Unck (born March 3, 1980) is a former linebacker for the Cleveland Browns from 2003 to 2006. He played college football at Arizona State University. He played primarily as a special teams player.

== Early life ==
Unck was born in Ogden, Utah, where he attended Bonneville High School and was a letterman in football and basketball.
