= South Weber, Utah =

City in Utah, United States

- City
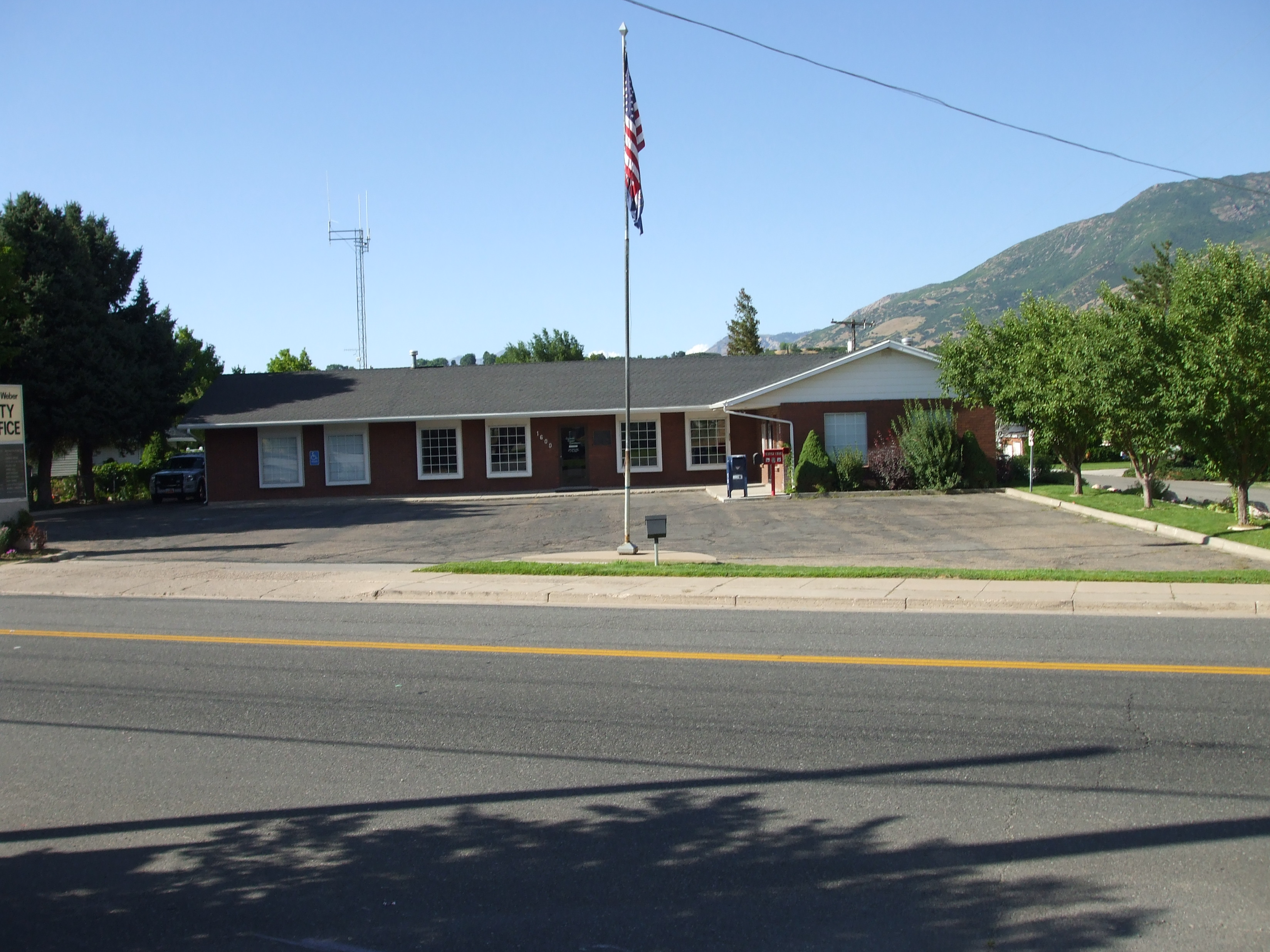
- South Weber City Office, August 2008

- Location in Davis County and the state of Utah
- Coordinates: 41°07′50″N 111°55′50″W
- Country: United States
- State: Utah
- County: Davis
- Settled: 1851
- Incorporated: 1938
- Named for: Weber River

Area
  - Total: 4.68 sq mi (12.11 km^{2})
  - Land: 4.63 sq mi (12.00 km^{2})
  - Water: 0.039 sq mi (0.10 km^{2})
- Elevation: 4,511 ft (1,375 m)

Population (2020)
  - Total: 7,867
  - Density: 1,690.8/sq mi (652.82/km^{2})
- Time zone: UTC-7 (Mountain (MST))
  - Summer (DST): UTC-6 (MDT)
- ZIP codes: 84403, 84405
- Area codes: 385, 801
- FIPS code: 49-71180
- GNIS feature ID: 2411944
- Website: southwebercity.gov

South Weber (/ˈwiːbər/ WEE-bər) is a city on the northeastern edge of Davis County, Utah, United States. It is part of the Ogden–Clearfield, Utah Metropolitan Statistical Area. The population was 7,867 at the 2020 census.

== History ==
South Weber was the site of the Morrisite War. On June 13, 1862, an estimated 500-man army perched cannons atop the bluffs on the south side of the city, aimed at Joseph Morris. The war lasted three days, and ultimately resulted in the death of Joseph Morris, John Banks, and a few others. Upon seeing their leaders dead, the remainder of the Morrisites surrendered.

South Weber is also known for a week of Bigfoot sightings in February 1980. For one week, residents reported signs of the legendary Sasquatch. At the time, multiple residents claimed to have seen the creature while feeding horses, smelled foul "bigfoot" odors, and found large patches of strange fur throughout the small community. Although no animal was ever found, the legend lives on.

Business Week magazine named South Weber the sixth best suburb in the country in 2009.

== Geography ==
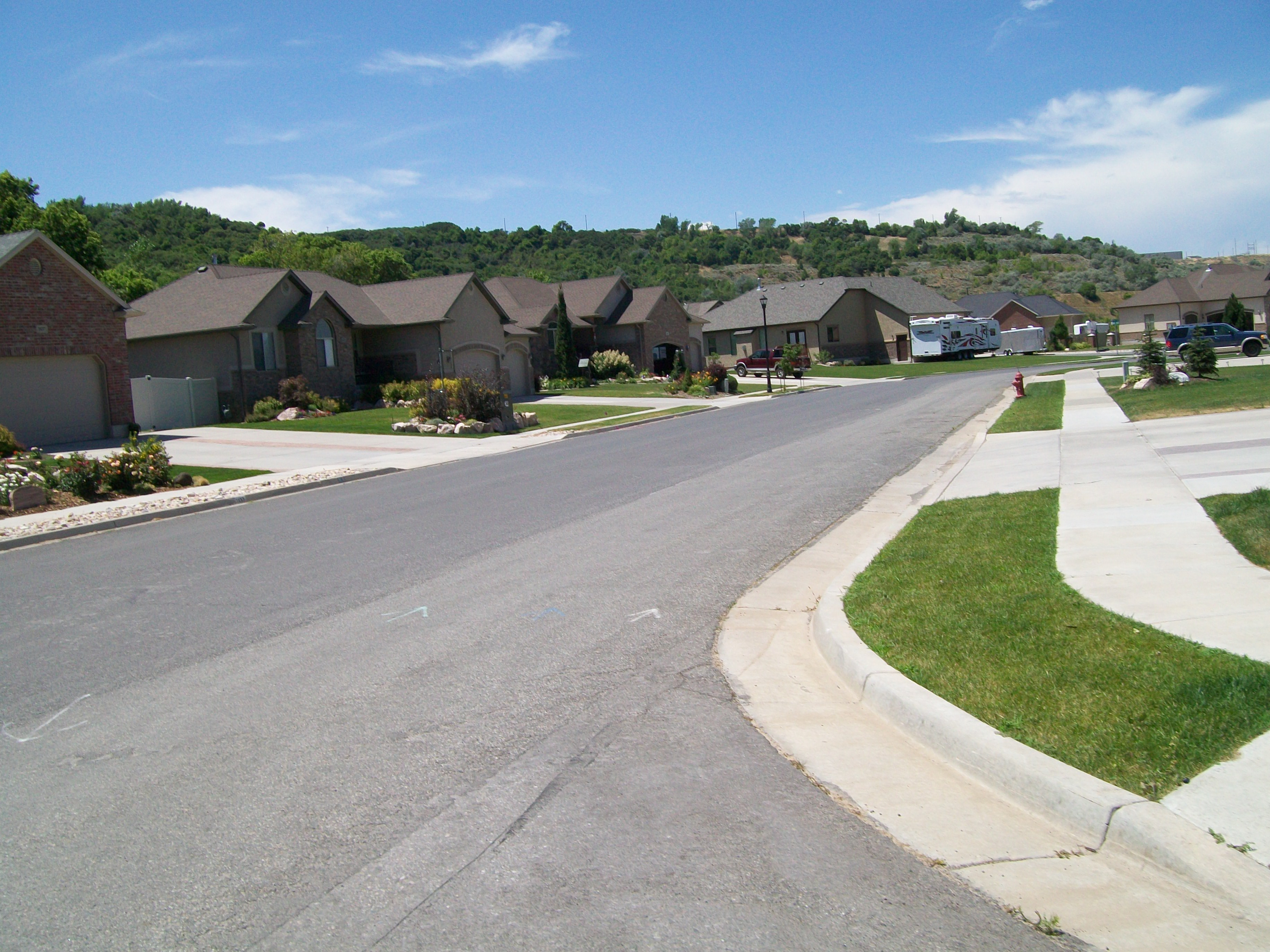
East 7500 South, a residential street in South Weber, Utah, July 2012

South Weber is located in northeastern Davis County, bordered to the north by the Weber County line. Neighboring cities are Uintah to the north, Washington Terrace and Riverdale to the northwest, and Layton to the south. Hill Air Force Base borders the southwest side of the city.

According to the United States Census Bureau, the city has a total area of 4.7 square miles (12.2 km^{2}), of which 0.04 square miles (0.1 km^{2}), or 1.20%, is water. The Weber River forms most of the northern boundary of the city.

Although located in Davis County, the city's streets follow the street grid of Weber County to the north (which is based upon the meridians of Ogden).

== Demographics ==
Historical population
Census	Pop.	Note	%±
1880	239		—
1890	267		11.7%
1900	256		−4.1%
1910	241		−5.9%
1920	266		10.4%
1930	279		4.9%
1940	259		−7.2%
1950	244		−5.8%
1960	382		56.6%
1970	1,073		180.9%
1980	1,575		46.8%
1990	2,863		81.8%
2000	4,260		48.8%
2010	6,051		42.0%
2020	7,867		30.0%
U.S. Decennial Census

=== 2020 census ===
As of the 2020 census, South Weber had a population of 7,867. The median age was 32.4 years, 32.3% of residents were under the age of 18, and 10.7% of residents were 65 years of age or older. For every 100 females there were 103.2 males, and for every 100 females age 18 and over there were 98.5 males age 18 and over.

97.8% of residents lived in urban areas, while 2.2% lived in rural areas.

There were 2,336 households in South Weber, of which 47.6% had children under the age of 18 living in them. Of all households, 75.0% were married-couple households, 9.2% were households with a male householder and no spouse or partner present, and 13.4% were households with a female householder and no spouse or partner present. About 12.4% of all households were made up of individuals and 5.3% had someone living alone who was 65 years of age or older.

There were 2,415 housing units, of which 3.3% were vacant. The homeowner vacancy rate was 1.1% and the rental vacancy rate was 7.9%.

Racial composition as of the 2020 census
Race	Number	Percent
White	7,136	90.7%
Black or African American	64	0.8%
American Indian and Alaska Native	26	0.3%
Asian	91	1.2%
Native Hawaiian and Other Pacific Islander	17	0.2%
Some other race	118	1.5%
Two or more races	415	5.3%
Hispanic or Latino (of any race)	484	6.2%

=== 2010 census ===
As of the census of 2010, there were 6,051 people, 1,707 households, and 1,508 families residing in the city. The racial makeup of the city was 95.5% White, 0.4% African American, 0.2% Native American, 0.5% Asian, 0.2% Pacific Islander, 1.1% from other races, and 2.1% from two or more races. Hispanic or Latino of any race were 4.3% of the population.

There were 1,707 households, out of which 50.3% had children under the age of 18 living with them, 80.7% were married couples living together, 5.5% had a female householder with no husband present, and 11.7% were non-families. 9.1% of all households were made up of individuals, and 2.7% had someone living alone who was 65 years of age or older. The average household size was 3.54 and the average family size was 3.81.

In the city, the population was spread out, with 365% under the age of 18, and 6.0% who were 65 years of age or older. The median age was 29.5 years. For every 100 females, there were 102.4 males.

== See also ==
- List of cities and towns in Utah
