= Ogden Regional Medical Center =

- Hospital Corporation of America

Geography
- Location: Ogden, Utah, United States
- Coordinates: 41°09′50″N 111°58′12″W

Services
- Beds: 238

History
- Opened: September 18, 1946

Links
- Website: ogdenregional.com
- Lists: Hospitals in Utah

The Ogden Regional Medical Center is a hospital in Ogden, Utah.

== Overview ==
Ogden Regional has 239 licensed beds, 300 physician medical staff, 1,000 employees & volunteers, with 77,000 outpatient visits per year and 7,500 annual inpatient admissions. Annually, it performs 10,000 surgeries, processes 25,000 units of blood and performs 2,500 deliveries. It is accredited by the Joint Commission on Accreditation of Healthcare Organizations (JCAHO) and is a Level II trauma center verified by the American College of Surgeons.

== History ==
The hospital was founded by nuns from the Order of St. Benedict in Ogden, Utah. It first opened on September 18, 1946, at 3000 Polk.

Due to expansion, a new hospital in Washington Terrace was dedicated in 1977. These buildings housed numerous hospital programs, while providing convenient office space for many physicians and related healthcare activities.

In July 1977, the Val A. Browning Radiation Therapy Center, now called the Val A. Browning Cancer Treatment Center, opened its doors, to treat cancer patients from throughout Northern Utah and surrounding states. As a result, St. Benedict's helped organize the Hospice of Northern Utah for terminally ill patients and their relatives.

On Mother's Day, 1992, they opened a new Women's and Children's Center, which also housed OB/GYN and pediatric physician's offices. A new neonatal intensive care unit had previously opened in November 1987.

To further strengthen its cardiology program, the cardiac catheterization lab was upgraded, allowing the hospital to implement its nationally rated open-heart surgery program.

St. Benedict's had been affiliated with various organizations. Since 1995, the hospital, now called Ogden Regional Medical Center, became part of what is now Hospital Corporation of America (HCA). In May 2000, Ogden Regional Medical Center joined five other HCA-affiliated hospitals in Utah to announce a new network named MountainStar Healthcare.
