= Bonneville High School (Washington Terrace, Utah) =

Location
- 251 East Laker Way; Washington Terrace, Utah 84405; 41°10′30″N 111°58′30″W

Information
- Type: Public, secondary high school
- Principal: Richard Murray
- Faculty: 118
- Grades: 10-12
- Enrollment: 1,405 (2023-2024)
- Colors: Navy,Gold and White
- Athletics conference: UHSAA 5A
- Mascot: Lakers
- Website: bonneville.wsd.net

Bonneville High School is a secondary high school in Washington Terrace, Utah, United States.

== History ==
Bonneville first opened its doors in the fall of 1960 to approximately 900 students, including freshmen. The school was built to address the overwhelming population growth (attributed to the post-war "baby boom") at the south end of Weber County.

The school was built at a large cost to the Weber County School District. Every effort was made to make Bonneville reflect the latest in technology and culture. The building itself was designed with large, open spaces such as a central courtyard and smaller atriums spread throughout the campus.

As the area continued to grow, it became necessary to renovate the buildings to house a larger student population. Along with closing in the main courtyard and adding a new building behind the main structure, the freshman class was moved back into junior highs and middle schools. Several other additions and renovations have occurred since the 1970s.

T.H. Bell Junior High and South Ogden Junior High feed into Bonneville.

== State championships ==
- 1962-3 Lynn Pehrson, Wrestling Champion
- 1964-5 Mike Boyle and Craig Rock, Wrestling Champions
- 1975-6 Men's Track 4A Champions
- 1978-9 Men's Cross Country 4A Champions
- 1979-80 Men's Cross Country 4A Champions
- 1980-1 Men's Football 4A Champions
- 1981-2 Men's Cross Country 4A Champions
- 1984-5 Todd Wheelwright, Wrestling 4A State Heavyweight Champion
- 1984-5 Men's Basketball 4A Champions
- 1985-6 Men's Cross Country 4A Champions
- 1986-7 Men's Basketball 4A Champions
- 1988-9 Larry Hanson, Wrestling 4A 189 lb. State Champion
- 1994-5 Joshua Iverson, Wrestling 4A 145 lb. State Champion
- 2003-4 Women's 4A Softball Champions
- 2004-5 Women's 4A Softball Champions
- 2005-6 Lakette Drill Team First Place State Champions
- 2006-7 Men's Golf 4A Champions
- 2007-8 Utah Winter Drumline Association Scholastic A Champions
- 2007-8 Lakette Drill Team First Place State Champions
- 2008-9 Women's 4A Soccer Champions
- 2010-11 Women's 4A Soccer Champions
- 2010-11 Men's 4A State Golf Champions
- 2010-11 Women's 4A State Golf Champions
- 2011-12 Women's 4A State Golf Champions
- 2012-13 Women's 4A Soccer Champions
- 2014-15 Laker Cheer Team First Place State Champions

Note: 4A classification was largest in the state of Utah until 1996.

== Notable alumni ==
- Tanoka Beard - professional basketball player
- Corey Clark - controversial American Idol contestant who was disqualified over criminal history
- Ed Eyestone - two-time Olympic marathoner, 1988 and 1992; third in the world in 1980 IAAF Cross-Country Juniors
- Andy Ludwig - collegiate offensive coordinator
- Mason Unck - former NFL football player for the Cleveland Browns
- Jeff Leatham - floral design creative director for hotels in Beverly Hills and Philadelphia who has received international recognition
