= South Ogden, Utah =

City in Utah, United States

South Ogden
- City
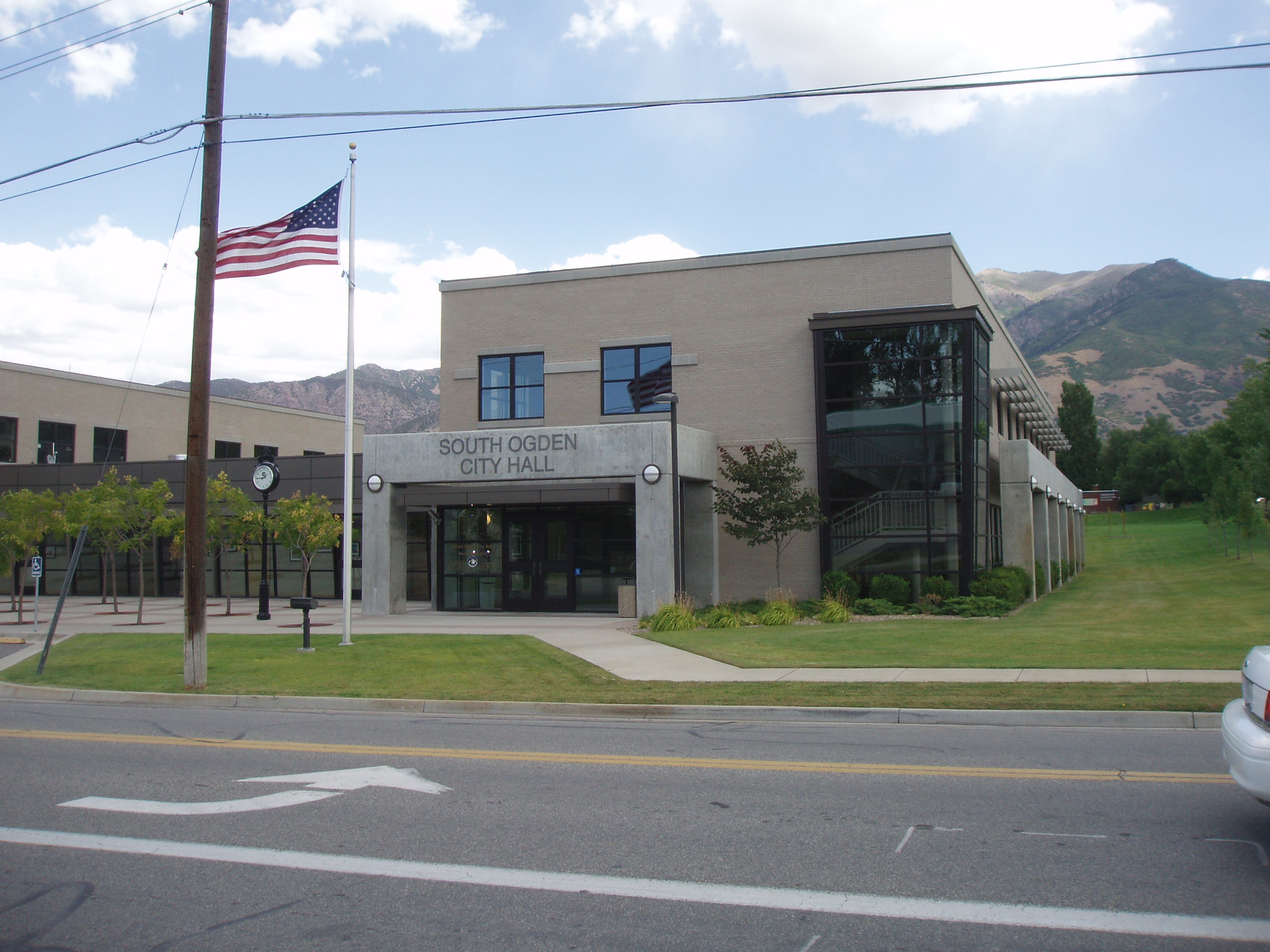
- City hall

- Location in Weber County and the State of Utah
- Coordinates: 41°10′20″N 111°57′28″W
- Country: United States
- State: Utah
- County: Weber
- Settled: 1848
- Incorporated: July 6, 1936
- Named for: Peter Skene Ogden

Government
  - Type: City Manager

Area
  - Total: 3.90 sq mi (10.10 km^{2})
  - Land: 3.90 sq mi (10.10 km^{2})
  - Water: 0 sq mi (0.00 km^{2})
- Elevation: 4,675 ft (1,425 m)

Population (2020)
  - Total: 17,488
  - Density: 4,411.5/sq mi (1,703.28/km^{2})
- Time zone: UTC-7 (Mountain (MST))
  - Summer (DST): UTC-6 (MDT)
- ZIP code: 84403
- Area codes: 385, 801
- FIPS code: 49-70960
- GNIS feature ID: 2411939
- Website: Official website

South Ogden is a city in Weber County, Utah, United States with 17,199 residents. The population was 17,488 at the 2020 census. It is part of the Ogden–Clearfield, Utah Metropolitan Statistical Area. The current mayor is Russell L. Porter.

== Geography ==
According to the United States Census Bureau, the city has a total area of 3.7 square miles (9.5 km^{2}), all land.

== Demographics ==
Historical population
Census	Pop.	Note	%±
1940	1,407		—
1950	3,763		167.4%
1960	7,405		96.8%
1970	9,991		34.9%
1980	11,366		13.8%
1990	12,105		6.5%
2000	14,377		18.8%
2010	16,532		15.0%
2020	17,488		5.8%
2023 (est.)	17,678		1.1%
U.S. Decennial Census

=== 2020 census ===
As of the 2020 census, South Ogden had a population of 17,488. The median age was 34.0 years. 24.9% of residents were under the age of 18 and 15.9% of residents were 65 years of age or older. For every 100 females there were 98.0 males, and for every 100 females age 18 and over there were 96.0 males age 18 and over.

100.0% of residents lived in urban areas, while 0.0% lived in rural areas.

There were 6,597 households in South Ogden, of which 33.0% had children under the age of 18 living in them. Of all households, 50.1% were married-couple households, 18.1% were households with a male householder and no spouse or partner present, and 25.8% were households with a female householder and no spouse or partner present. About 26.8% of all households were made up of individuals and 12.5% had someone living alone who was 65 years of age or older.

There were 6,912 housing units, of which 4.6% were vacant. The homeowner vacancy rate was 0.6% and the rental vacancy rate was 6.4%.

Racial composition as of the 2020 census
Race	Number	Percent
White	13,977	79.9%
Black or African American	297	1.7%
American Indian and Alaska Native	140	0.8%
Asian	335	1.9%
Native Hawaiian and Other Pacific Islander	101	0.6%
Some other race	1,072	6.1%
Two or more races	1,566	9.0%
Hispanic or Latino (of any race)	2,570	14.7%

=== 2000 census ===
As of the census of 2000, there were 14,377 people, 5,193 households, and 3,873 families residing in the city. The population density was 3,917.1 people per square mile (1,512.5/km^{2}). There were 5,459 housing units at an average density of 1,487.3 per square mile (574.3/km^{2}). The racial makeup of the city was 91.51% White, 0.74% African American, 0.70% Native American, 1.45% Asian, 0.27% Pacific Islander, 3.18% from other races, and 2.15% from two or more races. Hispanic or Latino of any race were 7.35% of the population.

There were 5,193 households, out of which 34.9% had children under the age of 18 living with them, 59.9% were married couples living together, 10.8% had a female householder with no husband present, and 25.4% were non-families. 20.9% of all households were made up of individuals, and 9.6% had someone living alone who was 65 years of age or older. The average household size was 2.73 and the average family size was 3.18.

In the city, the population was spread out, with 27.3% under the age of 18, 11.7% from 18 to 24, 25.2% from 25 to 44, 20.1% from 45 to 64, and 15.8% who were 65 years of age or older. The median age was 34 years. For every 100 females, there were 97.0 males. For every 100 females age 18 and over, there were 93.4 males.

The median income for a household in the city was $46,794, and the median income for a family was $52,471. Males had a median income of $40,611 versus $25,856 for females. The per capita income for the city was $20,662. About 3.1% of families and 5.2% of the population were below the poverty line, including 6.3% of those under age 18 and 2.8% of those age 65 or over.

== History ==
The area was settled by members of the Mormon pioneers. Daniel Burch and his family arrived in Brownsville (Ogden) in 1848. Burch came from Kentucky with the Lorenzo Snow company of Utah pioneers. In 1850 the area was named Burch Creek in his honor. In 1852 the Weber Canal was built and Burch built a gristmill near its source in what is now Riverdale.

The Ogden City Council founded a six-room isolation facility for smallpox patients in Burch Creek in 1882. The area was a farming community with several dairy farms. There was little development until 1890 when extensive investments in land, both residential and commercial, took place.

Burch Creek Elementary and Junior High School was built in 1897. It was the first school in the area and was considered one of the most modern in the state. The first church building, the Ogden LDS 14th Ward, was erected in 1925.

In the 1930s Burch Creek was a farming community of about 800 people in need of more water. The water supply was augmented in 1934, a year of serious drought, when the Federal Drought Relief Agency financed the installation of a water supply line from Burch Creek Canyon. The question of annexing Burch Creek to Ogden was raised many times, but each time the proposal was rejected by a majority of the people. Burch Creek was in need of a sewer system, more water, roads, and sidewalks. In 1936 a committee petitioned Weber County commissioners to allow incorporation. The petition was granted and on July 6, 1936 the town of South Ogden was established.

South Ogden's close location to Hill Air Force Base and the Ogden Arsenal led to a housing boom in the 1940s. By 1946 the population exceeded 3,600, and South Ogden became known as the "City of Homes." The largest growth for the city came in the 1950s, at which time it grew by 150 percent. Because of this new growth, a new municipal building was constructed. The building also housed a fire station, and a new 1953 fire truck was purchased. Washington Boulevard was widened to four lanes south of 40th Street.

Mormon pioneers settled the area, and the LDS Church is still well represented, with several chapels located in the city. The Greek Orthodox Church of the Transfiguration was consecrated on December 18, 1969; the Holy Family Catholic Church was dedicated on May 26, 1981; and a few smaller denominations are also housed in the city.

In 2001, South Ogden elected Utah's first African American mayor—Mayor George Garwood. He beat his opponent 2,010 votes to 776. After his election Mayor Garwood said, "It's a joyous day, not just for the citizens of South Ogden but also for the citizens in Utah. To look beyond the color of a person's skin and to see their character is a great thing."

== See also ==
- List of cities and towns in Utah
