= Devil's Slide (Utah) =

Geologic formation in Utah, United States

Coordinates: 41°03′49″N 111°32′53″W

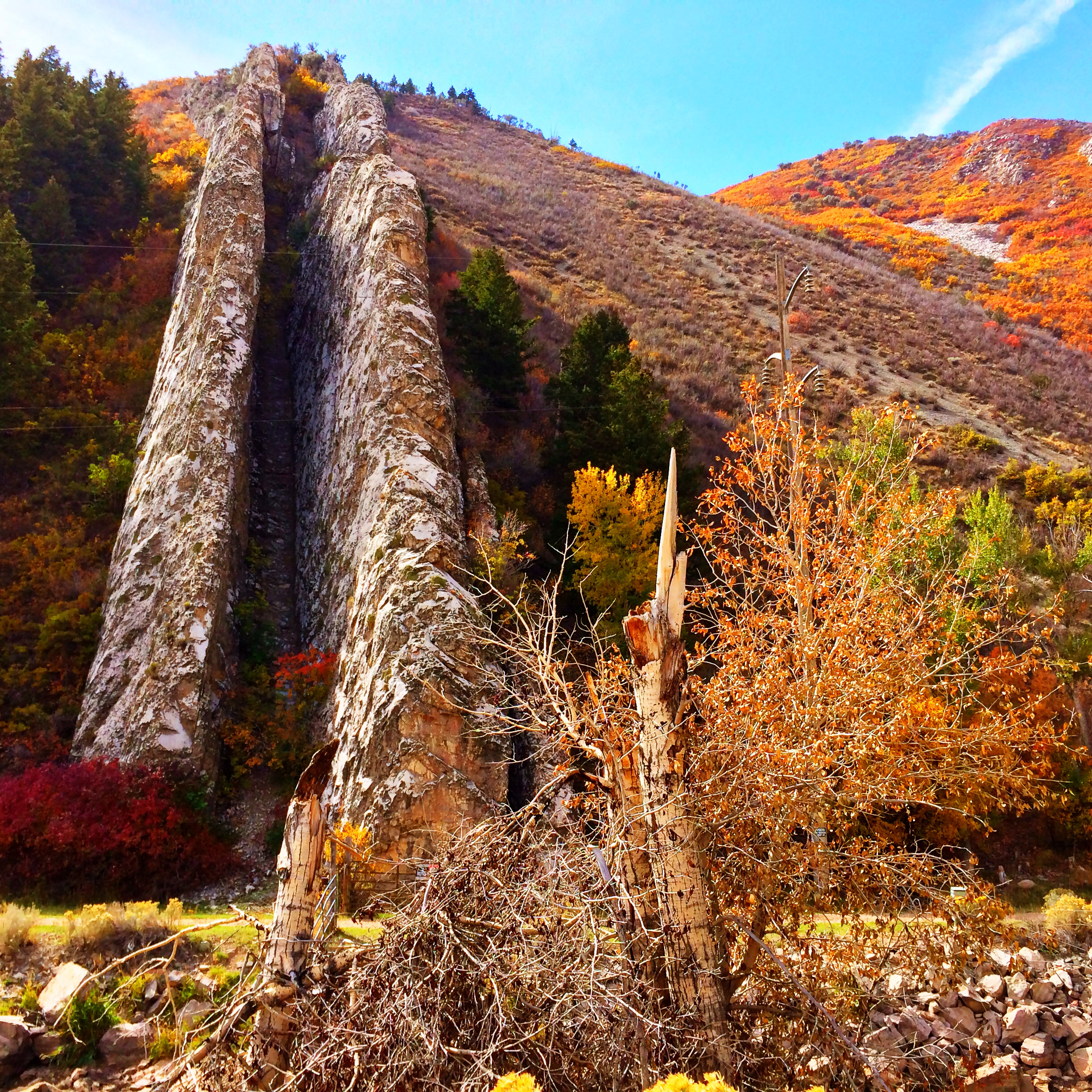
October 2013

Devil's Slide is a geological formation located in northern Utah's Weber Canyon, approximately 26 miles west of the Wyoming border, near the community of Croydon in Morgan County, Utah, United States. The Slide consists of two parallel limestone strata that have tilted to lie vertical, protruding 40 feet (12 m) out of the mountainside. Intervening layers have eroded more quickly, forming a channel running hundreds of feet down the mountain. The distance between the two slabs is around 25 feet (7.6 m).

I-84 runs right past Devil's Slide, which can be clearly seen from the road. The Weber River flows between the formation and the freeway. There are parking areas on both sides of the highway for viewing the Slide.

== Background ==
Early settlers, including a well known railman by the name of John Walker, called the site "Gutter Defile" on their maps. The settlers were working with the Transcontinental Railroad to establish tracks through the Weber Canyon, Utah area.

There are four other geological formations in the United States called "Devil's Slide," including California and Montana, just north of Yellowstone in addition to the one in Utah. Utah Geologists believe the Slide's strata was deposited 170 to 180 million years ago by a shallow sea that covered the area. The layers were then tilted during a mountain-forming event around 75 million years ago. Center layers of a different composition have eroded away over millions of years. The first mentioning of Devil's Slide by its current name was in 1875.

The Salt Lake Tribune printed a story on the workcamp turned small town near the Slide on June 28, 1888, authored by Allan Forman. The town had sprung up due to the abundant limestone available in the area. The Native American tour guide the newspaper had hired called the formation, "Devil's War Club." The mining town was originally called Portland, but would be renamed Devil's Slide in honor of the proximity to the Slide nearby. Before the Great Depression, Devil's Slide had 500 residents, but would slowly close down until only a school and small group of families remained. The town would eventually be closed after the mining company shut down operations. A large gravel pit is the only evidence the town existed that remains to this day.

== Gallery ==
Devil's Slide photo by Carleton Watkins, c.1874

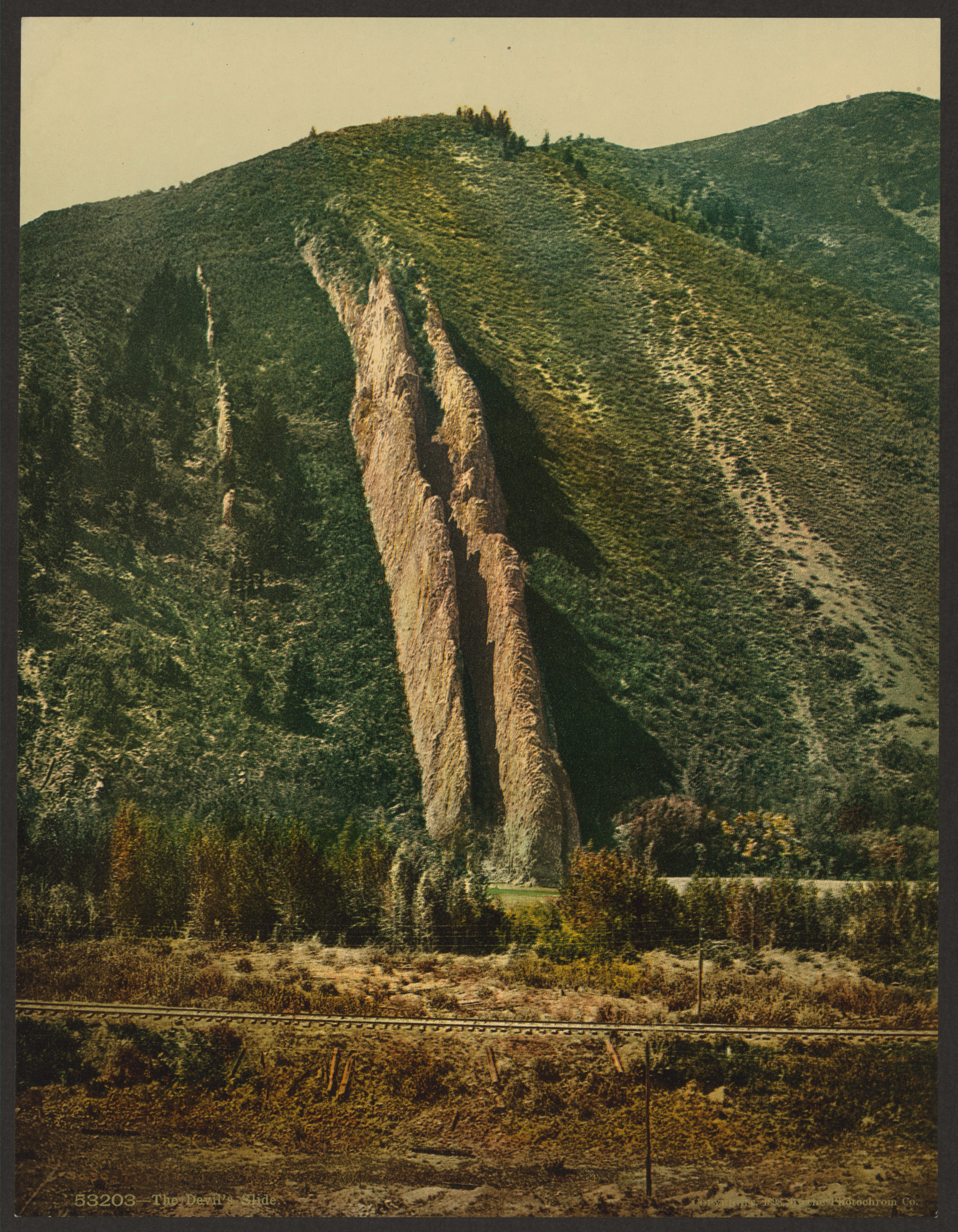
Photochrom print, 1898

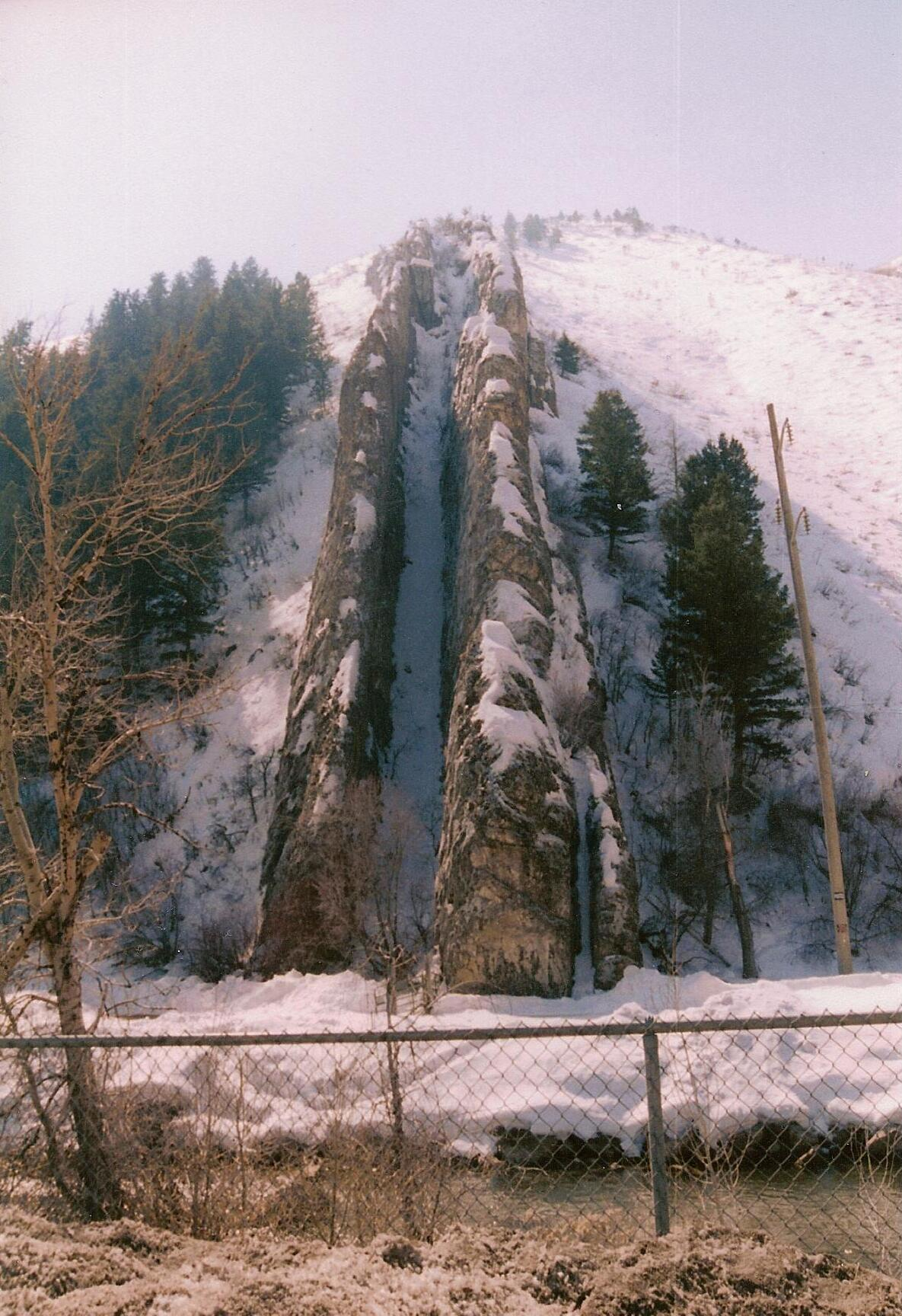
Front view in March 2008 from the south parking area

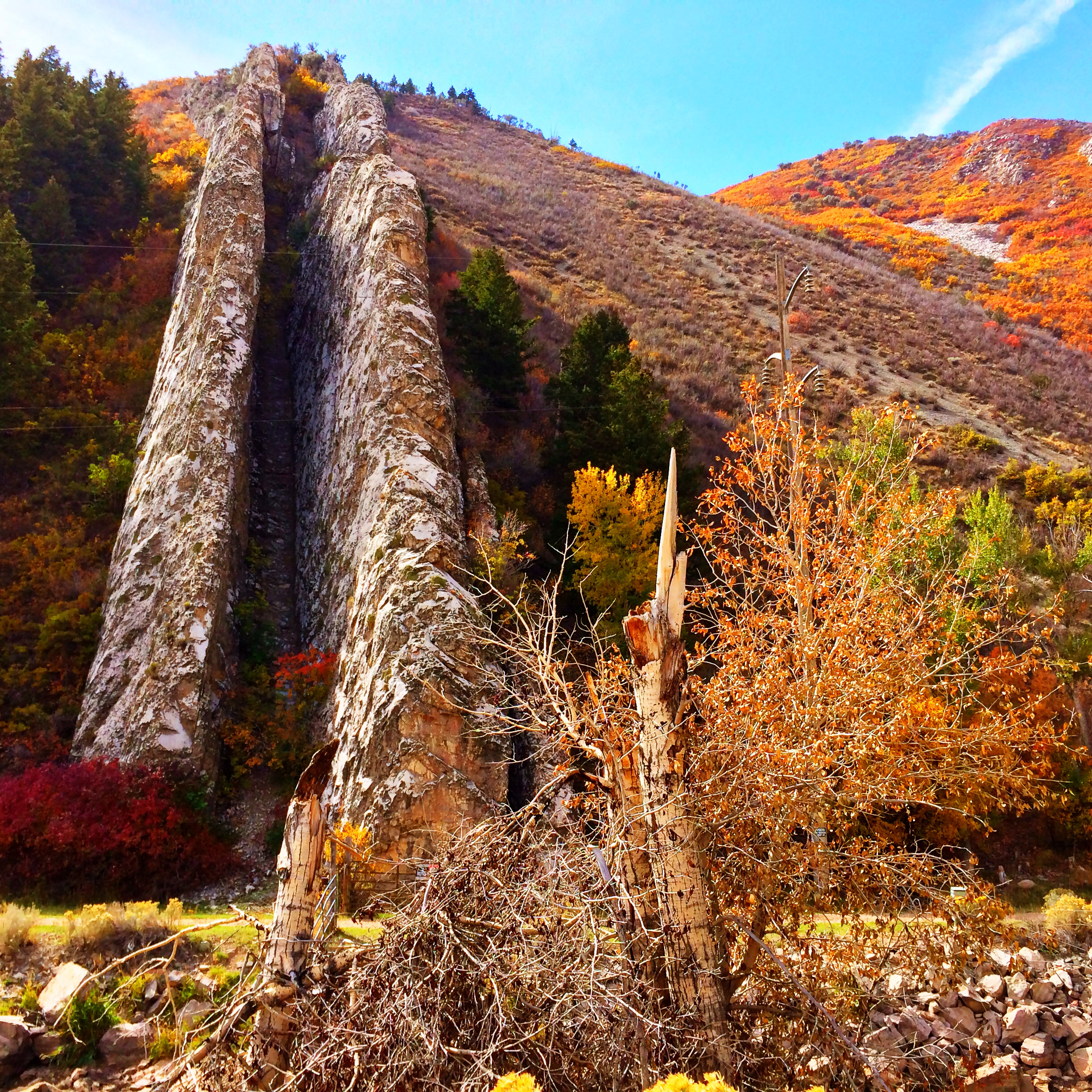
October 2013

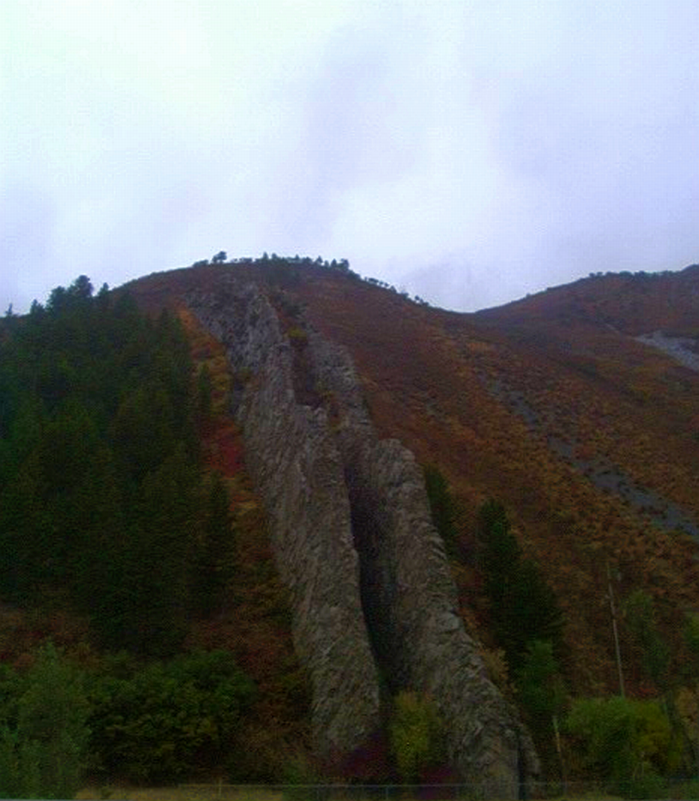
Front view in Fall of 2008
