= Weber Canyon =

Canyon in the Wasatch Range near Ogden, Utah

Coordinates: 41°08′09″N 111°54′14″W

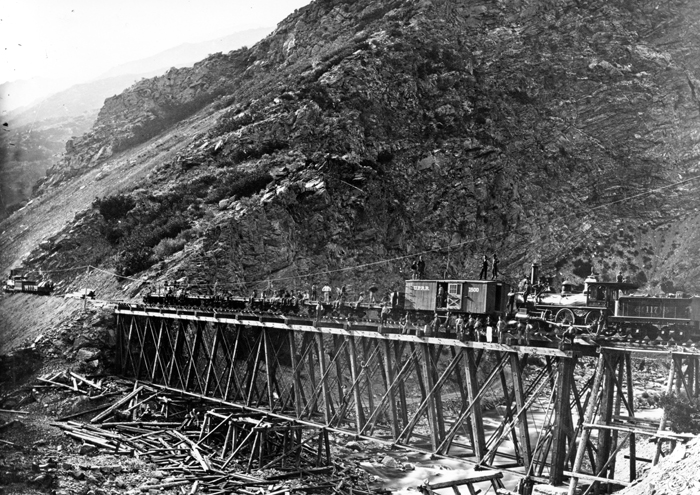
- The building of Devil's Gate Bridge in Weber Canyon, 1869
- Interactive map of Weber Canyon
- Traversed by: I-84 Overland Route

Weber Canyon is a canyon in the Wasatch Range near Ogden, Utah, through which the Weber River flows west toward the Great Salt Lake. It is fed by 13 tributary creeks and is 40 miles (64 km) long.

== History ==
Weber Canyon is, historically, one of the more important canyons in Utah. The many streams that feed into the Weber River made the area attractive to prehistoric nomadic Native Americans, including the Shoshone and Ute tribes.

The river and canyon were named for fur trapper John Henry Weber. Early explorers also included Étienne Provost. In 1825, near the present-day community of Mountain Green, trappers of the British Hudson's Bay Company Snake Country Expedition, under the leadership of Peter Skene Ogden, had a confrontation with competing American trappers, under the leadership of Johnson Gardner. Gardner insisted that the British group was trespassing in United States Territory. Ogden kept the situation from becoming an international incident, although some of his men, including Canadian Antoine Godin, left his group to join Gardner.

Emigrants traveling to California, including the Hudspeth, Bryant-Russell, and Young and Harlan parties, took the first wagons through Weber Canyon in 1846. The first road through the canyon was completed in 1855 by a group led by Thomas J. Thurston. In 1868, Brigham Young contracted with the Union Pacific Railroad to build part of the transcontinental railroad through Weber Canyon.

== Attractions ==
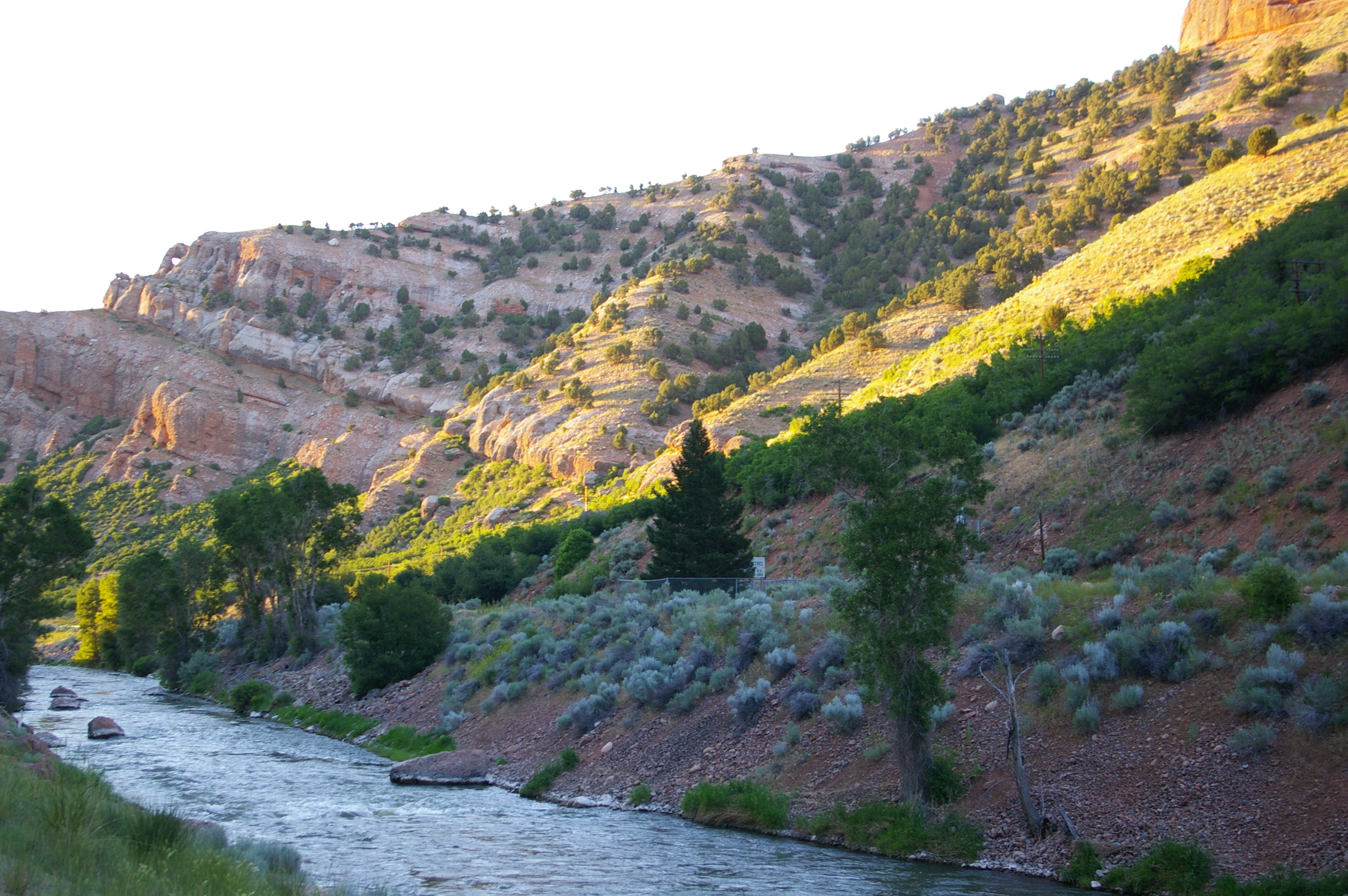
The Thousand Mile Tree seen from I-84

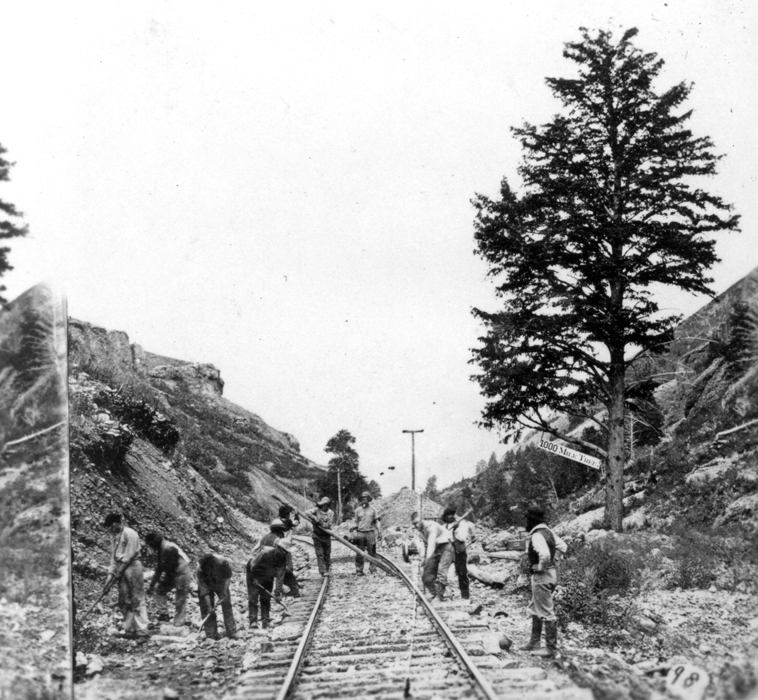
1000 Mile Tree in 1869

Interstate 84 now travels through Weber Canyon. The highway passes by an unusual geological formation called Devil's Slide.

There is also the 1000 Mile Tree, a pine discovered by Union Pacific Railroad workers marking 1,000 miles (1,600 km) from the railroad's origin in Omaha, Nebraska. The original tree died in 1900 and was removed in September of that year. In 1982 to commemorate the site, UP planted a new tree that has grown today to over 30 feet (9.1 m) tall.
