= Uintah, Utah =

City in Utah, United States

- City
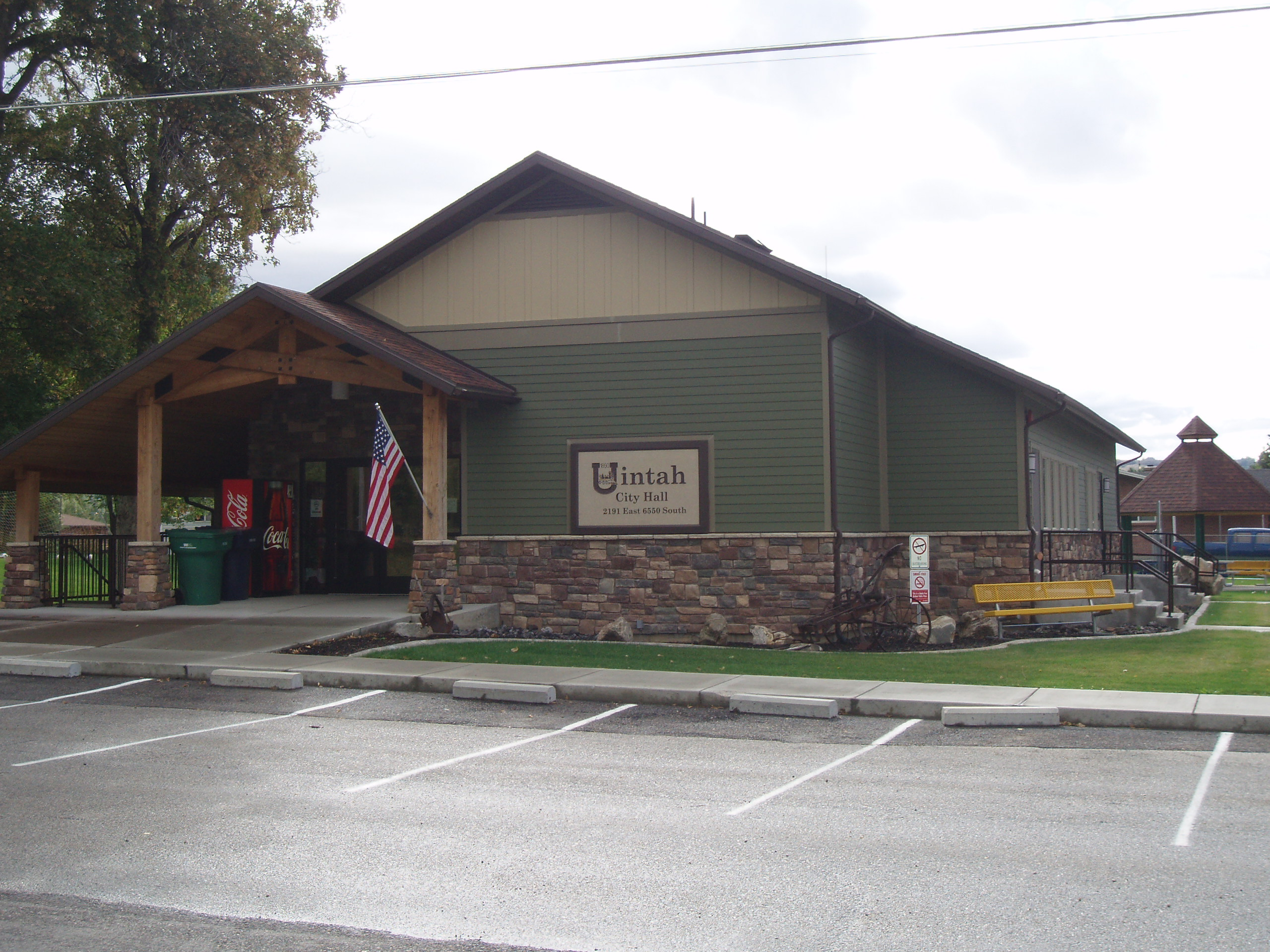
- City hall in Uintah, October 2011

- Location in Weber County and the state of Utah
- Coordinates: 41°08′34″N 111°55′59″W
- Country: United States
- State: Utah
- County: Weber
- Settled: 1850
- Incorporated: 1937

Area
  - Total: 1.25 sq mi (3.23 km^{2})
  - Land: 1.24 sq mi (3.22 km^{2})
  - Water: 0.0077 sq mi (0.02 km^{2})
- Elevation: 4,502 ft (1,372 m)

Population (2020)
  - Total: 1,454
  - Density: 1,089.8/sq mi (420.76/km^{2})
- Time zone: UTC-7 (Mountain (MST))
  - Summer (DST): UTC-6 (MDT)
- ZIP codes: 84403, 84405
- Area codes: 385, 801
- FIPS code: 49-77890
- GNIS feature ID: 2413411
- Website: www.uintahcity.gov

Uintah (/juːˈɪntə/ yoo-IN-tə) is a city in Weber County, Utah, United States. The population was 1,454 at the 2020 census. It is part of the Ogden–Clearfield, Utah Metropolitan Statistical Area. Although Uintah was a town in 2000, it has since been classified as a fifth-class city by state law.

== Geography ==
Uintah is located at the mouth of Weber Canyon, 5 miles (8.0 km) south of Ogden and 25 miles (40 km) north of Salt Lake City. It is bordered by the Weber River on the south and west, by the Uintah Bench on the north, and the Wasatch Mountains on the east. The town occupies approximately three square miles in an area noted for frequent east winds out of Weber Canyon. According to the United States Census Bureau, the city has a total area of 1.0 square mile (2.6 km^{2}), all land.

=== Climate ===
This climatic region is typified by large seasonal temperature differences, with warm to hot (and often humid) summers and cold (sometimes severely cold) winters. According to the Köppen Climate Classification system, Uintah has a humid continental climate, abbreviated "Dfb" on climate maps.

== History ==
Long before the first Anglo-Europeans came to Utah, the Uintah area was a favorite camping and hunting ground for Native Americans as they traveled through Weber Canyon. Archeological work has revealed Native American presence dating back at least 5,000 years. In fact, Uintah is named after the Weber Ute Band of Shoshone Indians which occupied the area at the time of white settlement.

The city was established in 1850.

Historical population
Census	Pop.	Note	%±
1880	247		—
1890	228		−7.7%
1900	302		32.5%
1910	178		−41.1%
1920	310		74.2%
1930	304		−1.9%
1940	264		−13.2%
1950	317		20.1%
1960	344		8.5%
1970	400		16.3%
1980	439		9.8%
1990	760		73.1%
2000	1,127		48.3%
2010	1,322		17.3%
2020	1,454		10.0%
U.S. Decennial Census

== Demographics ==
As of the census of 2000, there were 1,127 people, 365 households, and 290 families residing in the town. The population density was 1,120.4 people per square mile (430.8/km^{2}). There were 374 housing units at an average density of 371.8 per square mile (143.0/km^{2}). The racial makeup of the town was 98.14% White, 0.62% African American, 0.18% Native American, 0.27% Asian, 0.09% Pacific Islander, 0.35% from other races, and 0.35% from two or more races. Hispanic or Latino of any race were 1.24% of the population.

There were 365 households, out of which 42.2% had children under the age of 18 living with them, 72.6% were married couples living together, 3.8% had a female householder with no husband present, and 20.3% were non-families. 15.9% of all households were made up of individuals, and 6.8% had someone living alone who was 65 years of age or older. The average household size was 3.09 and the average family size was 3.51.

In the town the population was spread out, with 32.1% under the age of 18, 9.9% from 18 to 24, 27.3% from 25 to 44, 21.7% from 45 to 64, and 9.0% who were 65 years of age or older. The median age was 33 years. For every 100 females, there were 99.1 males. For every 100 females age 18 and over, there were 105.1 males.

The median income for a household in the town was $52,300, and the median income for a family was $54,519. Males had a median income of $45,903 versus $30,268 for females. The per capita income for the town was $21,424. About 1.6% of families and 2.0% of the population were below the poverty line, including 1.9% of those under age 18 and none of those age 65 or over.

== See also ==
- List of cities and towns in Utah
