= Washington Terrace, Utah =

City in Utah, United States

- City
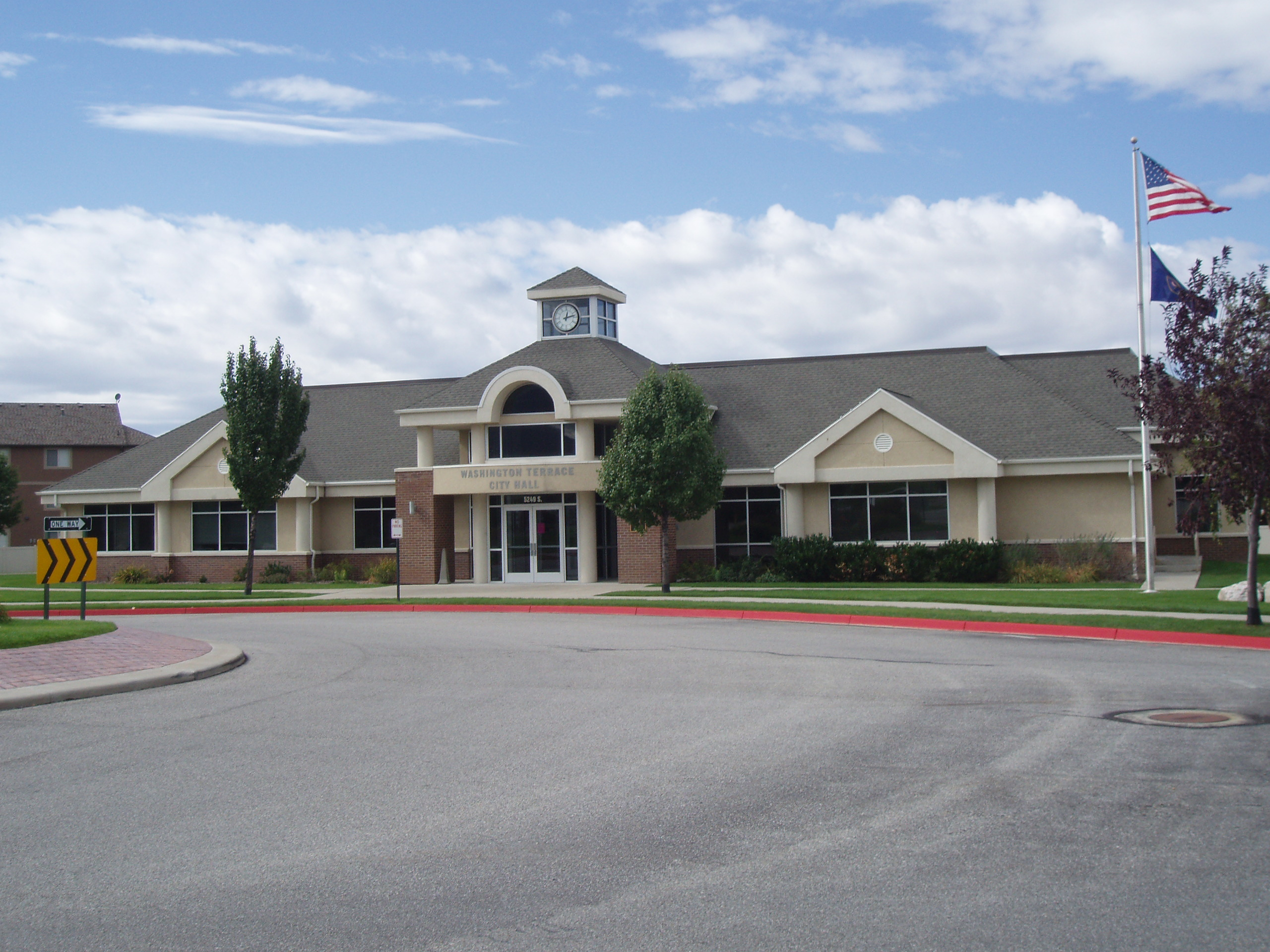
- City hall

- Location in Weber County and the state of Utah
- Coordinates: 41°10′06″N 111°58′41″W
- Country: United States
- State: Utah
- County: Weber
- Founded: 1948
- Founder: George Henry Van Leeuwen
- Named for: Washington Boulevard, a major Ogden street

Area
  - Total: 2.04 sq mi (5.28 km^{2})
  - Land: 2.04 sq mi (5.28 km^{2})
  - Water: 0 sq mi (0.00 km^{2})
- Elevation: 4,643 ft (1,415 m)

Population (2020)
  - Total: 9,267
  - Density: 4,534.3/sq mi (1,750.69/km^{2})
- Time zone: UTC-7 (Mountain (MST))
  - Summer (DST): UTC-6 (MDT)
- ZIP code: 84405
- Area codes: 385, 801
- FIPS code: 49-82070
- GNIS feature ID: 2412188
- Website: City of Washington Terrace

Washington Terrace is a city in Weber County, Utah, United States. The population was 9,267 at the 2020 census. It is part of the Ogden–Clearfield, Utah Metropolitan Statistical Area.

== Historical events ==
Washington Terrace had its foundings when it was developed in 1948 from a war time housing project. George Herman Van Leeuwen was instrumental in securing the land from the federal government and acted as the President of the Board of Directors. Due to his role in the organizing of the community, it was proposed to be named VanLeeuwenville, which was voted down for a variety of reasons.

John Albert Taylor, who raped and murdered Charla King in Washington Terrace in 1989, was executed by firing squad in 1996.

Mayor Mark Allen was chosen by a dice roll when the 2003 election ended in a tie.

On September 22, 2016, an EF1 tornado struck the city at approximately 3:30 PM MDT, part of a line of storms that caused moderate damage throughout the Salt Lake City metropolitan area. One person sustained an injury from the tornado.

The ‘’Adams Fire’’ was a wildfire that occurred in Washington Terrace, Utah, on July 27, 2026. The fire was reported near Interstate 84 and Adams Avenue Parkway shortly before noon and spread rapidly through dry vegetation toward homes on the southern side of the city. The fire initially was estimated at 75 acres, but subsequent mapping determined that approximately 45 acres had burned. (Standard-Examiner)

Evacuation orders were issued for residences in the southern part of Washington Terrace, affecting approximately 250 homes. The orders were lifted later that afternoon after firefighters gained control of the fire. A trailer was heavily damaged and a nearby home sustained minor damage. (Standard-Examiner)

Two people were injured during the fire, including a Weber County Sheriff’s Office deputy. Washington Terrace resident Cecil “Ted” Burrell, 87, was found near his home after deputies conducting evacuations discovered that he was unaccounted for. He was transported for medical treatment but later died from injuries sustained in the fire. (Standard-Examiner)

Firefighters and other emergency personnel from several surrounding communities and counties responded to the incident. The response included Utah state fire agencies, local fire departments, law enforcement agencies, Hill Air Force Base, and a North Dakota fire response team. (Standard-Examiner)

The fire was declared contained after firefighters secured the perimeter. As of September 2026, the cause of the fire remained under investigation. (Standard-Examiner)

== Geography ==
According to the United States Census Bureau, the city has a total area of 1.9 square miles (4.9 km^{2}), all land.

== Demographics ==
Historical population
Census	Pop.	Note	%±
1950	5,841		—
1960	6,441		10.3%
1970	7,241		12.4%
1980	8,212		13.4%
1990	8,189		−0.3%
2000	8,551		4.4%
2010	9,067		6.0%
2020	9,267		2.2%
2023 (est.)	9,070		−2.1%
U.S. Decennial Census

=== 2020 census ===
As of the 2020 census, Washington Terrace had a population of 9,267. The median age was 32.6 years. 25.9% of residents were under the age of 18 and 15.6% of residents were 65 years of age or older. For every 100 females there were 97.8 males, and for every 100 females age 18 and over there were 92.1 males age 18 and over.

100.0% of residents lived in urban areas, while 0.0% lived in rural areas.

There were 3,357 households in Washington Terrace, of which 35.4% had children under the age of 18 living in them. Of all households, 47.4% were married-couple households, 17.2% were households with a male householder and no spouse or partner present, and 28.3% were households with a female householder and no spouse or partner present. About 24.2% of all households were made up of individuals and 11.8% had someone living alone who was 65 years of age or older.

There were 3,495 housing units, of which 3.9% were vacant. The homeowner vacancy rate was 0.8% and the rental vacancy rate was 5.7%.

Racial composition as of the 2020 census
Race	Number	Percent
White	7,299	78.8%
Black or African American	181	2.0%
American Indian and Alaska Native	88	0.9%
Asian	132	1.4%
Native Hawaiian and Other Pacific Islander	58	0.6%
Some other race	668	7.2%
Two or more races	841	9.1%
Hispanic or Latino (of any race)	1,667	18.0%

=== 2000 census ===
As of the 2000 census, there were 8,551 people, 3,019 households, and 2,267 families residing in the city. The population density was 4,477.4 people per square mile (1,728.6/km^{2}). There were 3,162 housing units at an average density of 1,655.7 per square mile (639.2/km^{2}). The racial makeup of the city was 89.43% White, 2.25% African American, 0.57% Native American, 1.19% Asian, 0.35% Pacific Islander, 3.93% from other races, and 2.28% from two or more races. Hispanic or Latino of any race were 7.88% of the population.

There were 3,019 households, out of which 36.0% had children under the age of 18 living with them, 56.7% were married couples living together, 13.4% had a female householder with no husband present, and 24.9% were non-families. 20.9% of all households were made up of individuals, and 10.1% had someone living alone who was 65 years of age or older. The average household size was 2.77 and the average family size was 3.21.

In the city, the population was spread out, with 27.9% under the age of 18, 13.7% from 18 to 24, 24.9% from 25 to 44, 18.3% from 45 to 64, and 15.2% who were 65 years of age or older. The median age was 31 years. For every 100 females, there were 95.7 males. For every 100 females age 18 and over, there were 89.0 males.

The median income for a household in the city was $42,243, and the median income for a family was $47,332. Males had a median income of $35,938 versus $26,406 for females. The per capita income for the city was $17,240. About 5.5% of families and 7.9% of the population were below the poverty line, including 10.5% of those under age 18 and 3.4% of those age 65 or over.

== Education ==
Washington Terrace is home to four public schools: Bonneville High School, T.H. Bell Jr. High School, Roosevelt Elementary, and Washington Terrace Elementary.
