= List of dams and reservoirs in Utah =

Following is a list of dams and reservoirs in Utah.

All major dams are linked below. The National Inventory of Dams defines any "major dam" as being 50 feet (15 m) tall with a storage capacity of at least 5,000 acre-feet (6,200,000 m^{3}), or of any height with a storage capacity of 25,000 acre-feet (31,000,000 m^{3}).

== Dams and reservoirs in Utah ==
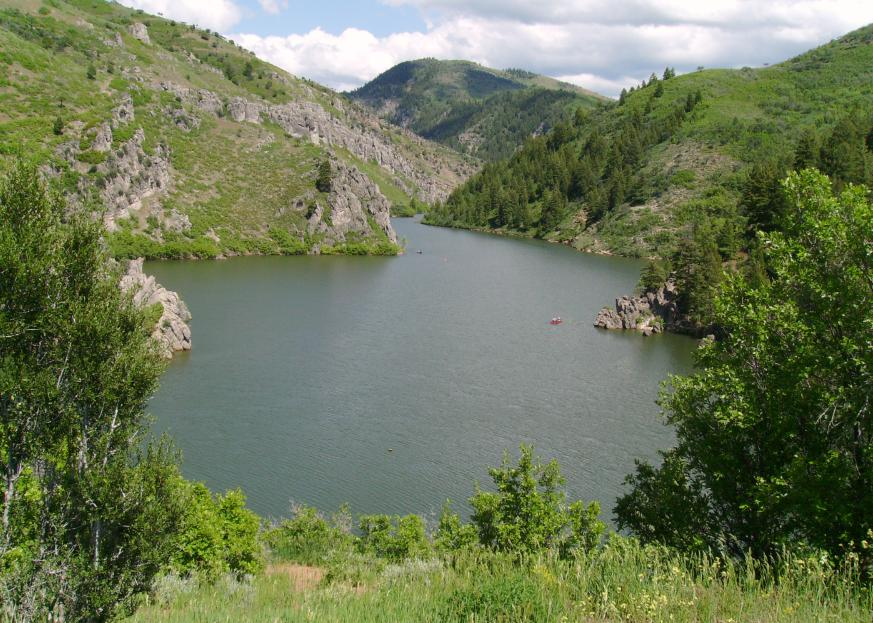
Causey Reservoir

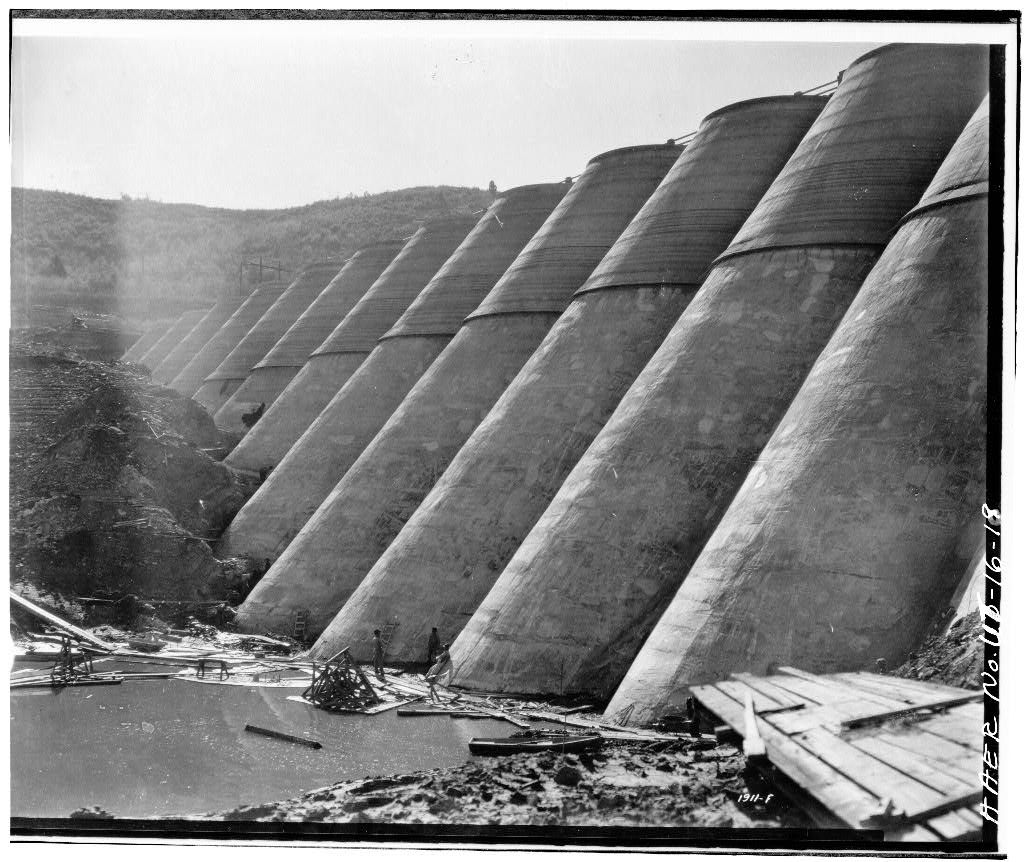
Mountain Dell Dam

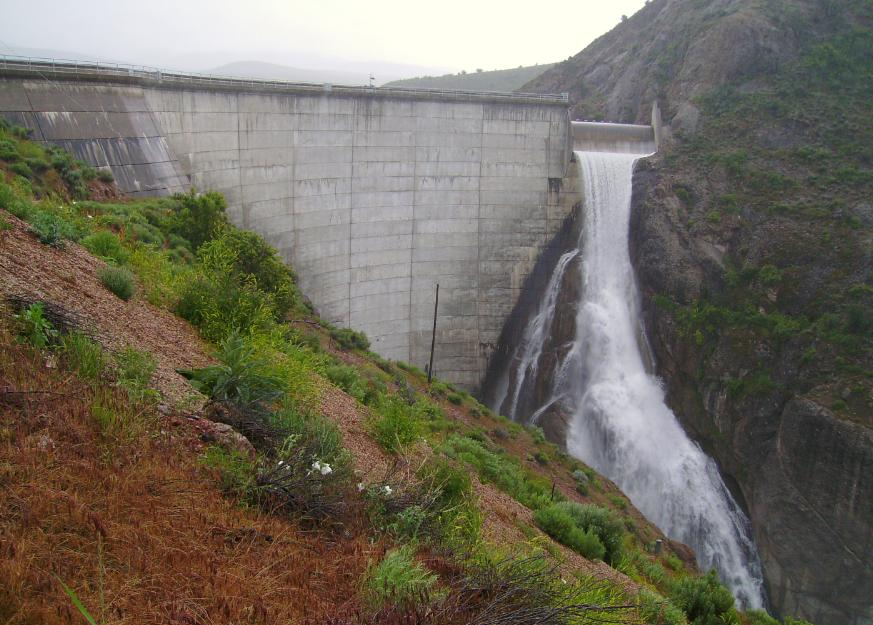
East Canyon Dam

This list is incomplete. You can help Wikipedia by expanding it.

- Arthur V. Watkins Dam, Willard Bay, United States Bureau of Reclamation (USBR)
- Baker Dam, Baker Dam Reservoir, Baker Reservoir Company
- Big Sand Wash Dam, Big Sand Wash Reservoir, Moon Lake Water Users
- Browne Lake Dam, Brown Lake
- Causey Dam, Causey Reservoir, USBR
- Currant Creek Dam, Currant Creek Reservoir, USBR
- Cutler Dam, Cutler Reservoir, PacifiCorp
- Deer Creek Dam and Reservoir, USBR
- East Canyon Dam, East Canyon Reservoir, USBR
- Echo Dam, Echo Reservoir, USBR
- Flaming Gorge Dam, Flaming Gorge Reservoir, USBR
- Goshen Dam, Goshen Reservoir, Goshen Irrigation Co.
- Grantsville Dam, Grantsville Reservoir
- Gunlock Dam, Gunlock Reservoir, Lower Gunlock Reservoir Corp.
- Huntington North Dam, Huntington Lake, USBR
- Hyrum Dam, Hyrum Reservoir, USBR
- Joes Valley Dam, Joes Valley Reservoir, USBR
- Jordanelle Dam, Jordanelle Reservoir, USBR
- Kolob Creek Dam, Kolob Reservoir, USBR
- Lake Mary - Phoebe Dam, Lake Mary
- Lake Powell, Glen Canyon Dam, USBR (dam in Arizona and Utah)
- Little Dell Dam, Little Dell Reservoir, United States Army Corps of Engineers
- Lost Creek Dam, Lost Creek Reservoir, USBR
- Lower Enterprise Dam, Enterprise Reservoir, Enterprise Reservoir & Canal Company
- Midview Dam, Midview Reservoir, USBR
- Minersville Dam, Minersville Reservoir, Minersville Reservoir Co.
- Mona Dam, Mona Reservoir, Currant Creek Irrigation Co.
- Moon Lake Dam, Moon Lake Reservoir, USBR
- Mountain Dell Dam, Mountain Dell Reservoir, Salt Lake City Corporation
- Newton Dam, Newton Reservoir, USBR
- Otter Creek Dam, Otter Creek Reservoir, Otter Creek Reservoir Co.
- Panguitch Dam, Panguitch Lake, West Panguitch Irrigation & Reservoir Co.
- Pineview Dam, Pineview Reservoir, USBR
- Porcupine Dam, Porcupine Reservoir, privately owned
- Red Fleet Dam, Red Fleet Reservoir, USBR
- Quail Creek Dam, Quail Creek Reservoir, Washington Co. Water Conservation District
- Scofield Dam, Scofield Reservoir, USBR
- Settlement Canyon Dam, Settlement Canyon Reservoir
- Soldier Creek Dam, Strawberry Reservoir, USBR
- Starvation Dam, Starvation Reservoir, USBR
- Steinaker Dam, Steinaker Reservoir, USBR
- Stateline Dam, Stateline Reservoir, USBR
- Upper Stillwater Dam, Upper Stillwater Reservoir, USBR
- Upper Enterprise Dam, Enterprise Reservoir, Enterprise Reservoir & Canal Company
- Wanship Dam, Rockport Reservoir, USBR

== See also ==
- List of dam removals in Utah
