= Utah State Route 65 =

State highway in Utah, United States

State Route 65

Route information
- Maintained by UDOT
- Length: 28.315 mi (45.569 km)
- Existed: 1931–present
- Restrictions: Closed in winter from mile 3 to 13.2

Major junctions
- South end: I-80 near Summit Park
- SR-66 in East Canyon State Park; SR-86 in Henefer; I-84 in Henefer
- North end: End State Maintenance sign in Henefer

Location
- Country: United States
- State: Utah

Highway system
- Utah State Highway System; Interstate; US; State; Minor; Scenic
← SR-64	→ SR-66

State Route 65 (SR-65) is a 28.315-mile-long (45.569 km) state highway in northern Utah. It connects Interstate 80 (I-80) near the Mountain Dell Dam to I-84 in Henefer.

== Route description ==
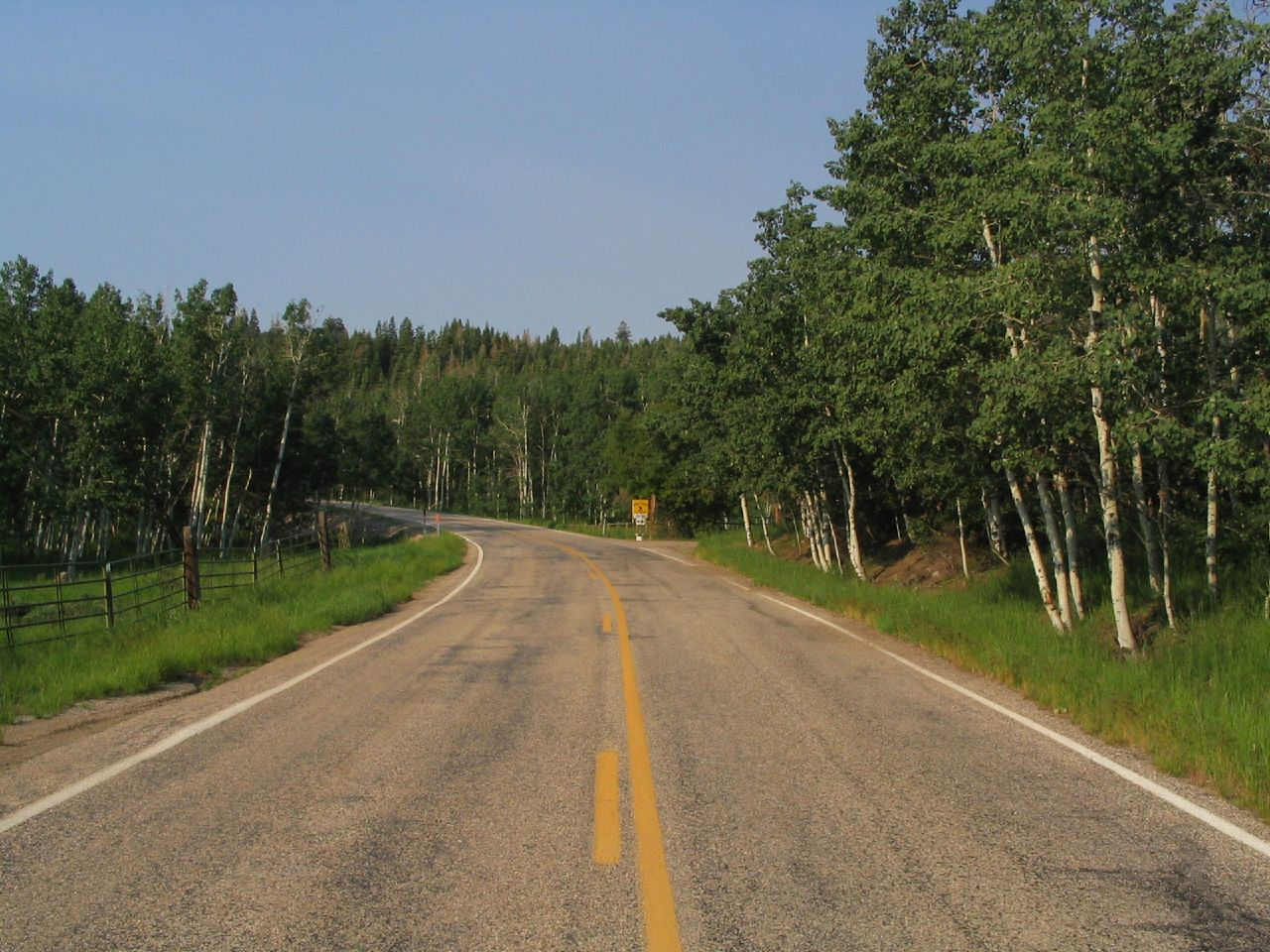
SR-65 near Emigration Canyon

From its southern terminus east of Salt Lake City and west of Park City, the highway goes north, crossing the Mountain Dell Golf Course. It partially circumnavigates the Little Dell Reservoir before it makes another turn for the north. Right before the Morgan County line the route turns northwest. When it reaches East Canyon State Park, SR-65 heads north-northwest, continuing this general direction until its northern terminus in Henefer.

== History ==
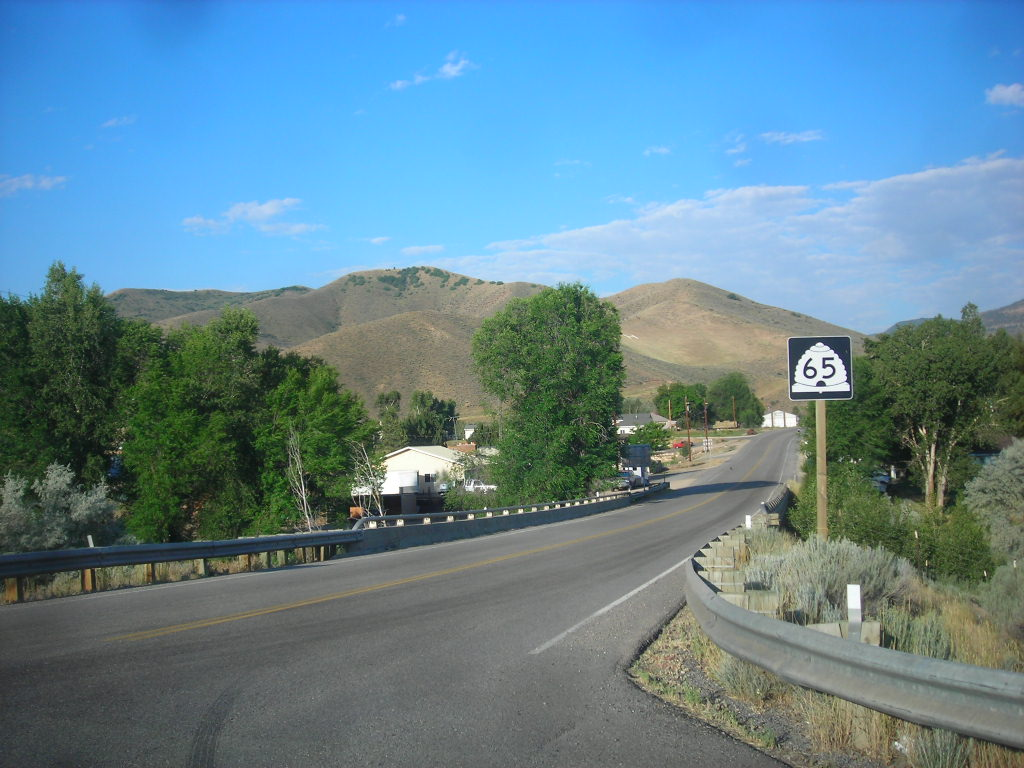
SR-65

State Route 65 was added to the state highway system in 1931, following the historic Mormon Trail as closely as practicable from SR-5 (US-30S, now I-84) in Henefer over Big Mountain Pass and through Emigration Canyon to Salt Lake City (later meeting SR-186 there). The portion of SR-65 east of Mountain Dell was removed from the route in 1945 in favor of a connection with SR-4 (US-40, now I-80) in Parley's Canyon. (The connecting SR-66 was truncated at the same time, and has since been reconnected.) Two years later, this law was essentially repealed, as SR-65 was moved back to the full Henefer-Salt Lake City route; the connection to SR-4 became a new State Route 239. Roads within This Is The Place Monument near the west end were also added to the route for the state to maintain. The state legislature removed the western portion in 1969, rerouting SR-65 to its current alignment between I-80 in Parley's Canyon and I-84 in Henefer and replacing SR-239. However, at the same time, SR-3 (which had replaced SR-5) was moved to I-84, and the old route through Henefer became an extension of SR-65 - in both directions. The western connection to I-84 was renumbered State Route 86 in 1975.

== Major intersections ==
County	Location	mi	km	Destinations	Notes
Salt Lake	Summit Park	0.000	0.000	I-80 – Salt Lake City, Cheyenne	Southern terminus; I-80 exit 134; diamond interchange
Morgan	East Canyon State Park	19.427	31.265	SR-66 north – Morgan	Southern terminus of SR-66
Summit	Henefer	27.417	44.123	SR-86 north (Main Street) to I-84 west	Southern terminus of SR-86
Summit	Henefer	28.240	45.448	I-84 to I-80 – Morgan	I-84 exit 115; diamond interchange
Summit	Henefer	28.315	45.569	End State Maintenance	Northern terminus
1.000 mi = 1.609 km; 1.000 km = 0.621 mi
