= Little Dell Reservoir =

Reservoir in the state of Utah, United States

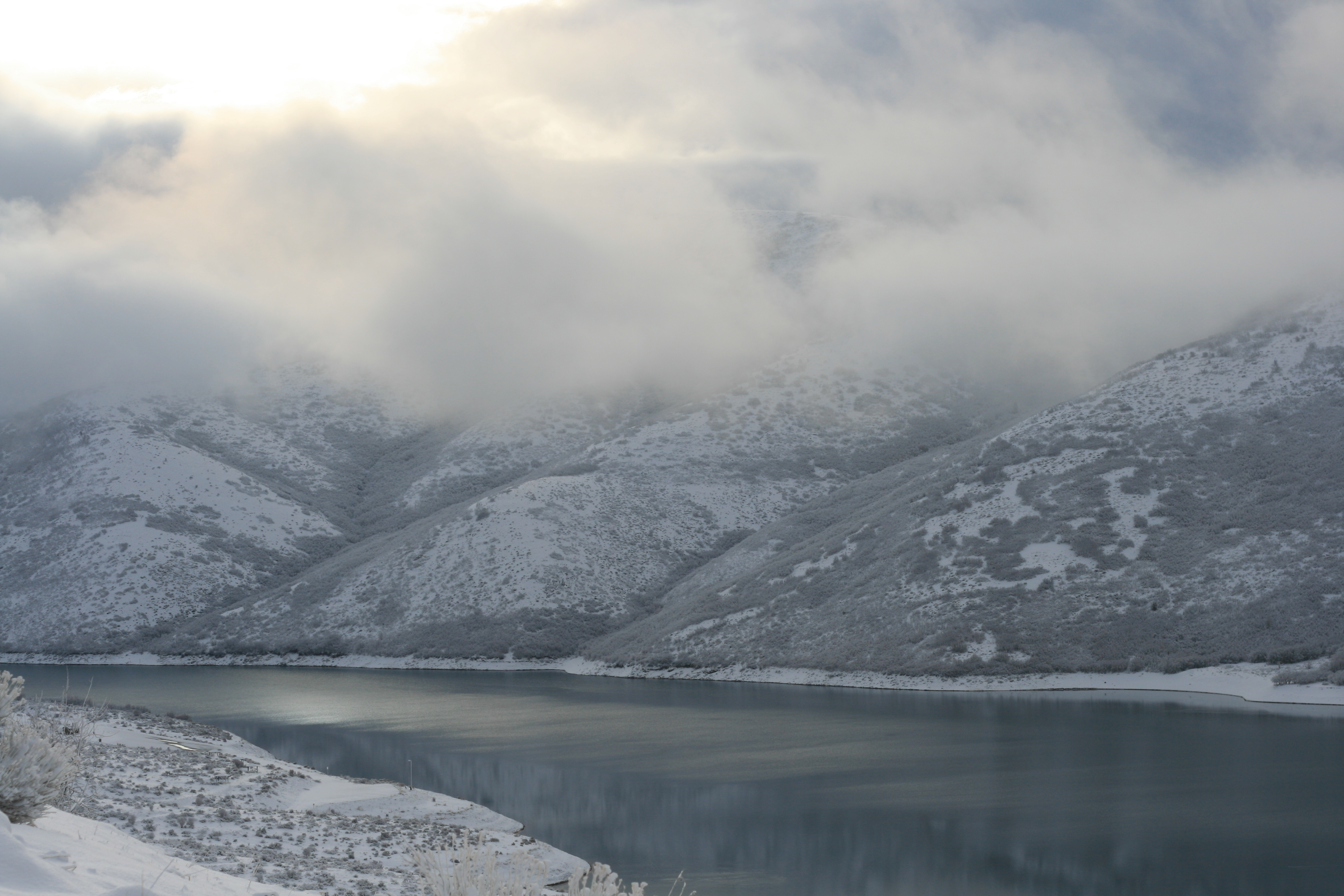
- Little Dell Reservoir in early Spring, April 2009

- Location within Utah Location within the United States
- Location: Salt Lake County, Utah, United States
- Coordinates: 40.7730°N 111.6935°W
- Type: Reservoir
- Primary inflows: Dell Creek
- Primary outflows: Dell Creek
- Basin countries: United States
- Surface area: 249 acres (101 ha)
- Average depth: 82.4 ft (25.1 m)
- Max. depth: 200.1 ft (61.0 m)
- Water volume: 20,500 acre⋅ft (25,300,000 m^{3})
- Surface elevation: 5,798 ft (1,767 m)

Little Dell Reservoir is a reservoir in eastern Salt Lake County, Utah, United States, about 13 miles (21 km) east of Salt Lake City in the western Wasatch Mountains.

== Description ==
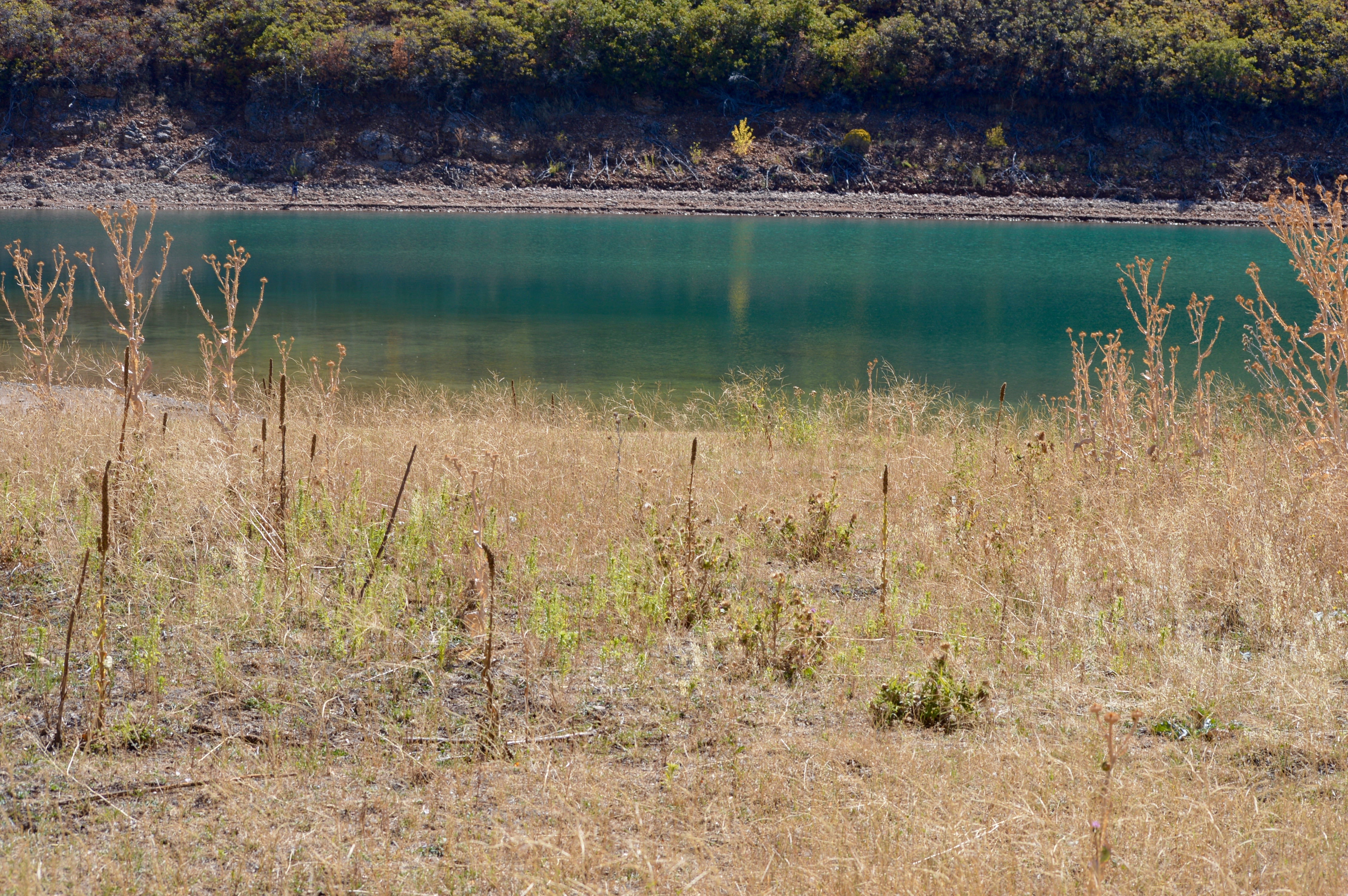
Site of the former Little Dell Station, September 2016

Little Dell is located alongside Utah State Route 65, about 1 mile (1.6 km) northeast of Interstate 80. It is an impoundment on Dell Creek, but it also stores water diverted from Parleys Creek located immediately downstream. The reservoir was constructed between 1987 and 1993 for drinking water supply and flood control as a joint venture between the United States Army Corps of Engineers, Metropolitan Water District of Salt Lake City, and Salt Lake County. The total cost of the project was US$63,864,932.00. The reservoir and recreation area is operated and maintained by the Salt Lake City Department of Public Utilities.

Construction of a storage facility on Dell Creek in Parley's Canyon, Salt Lake County, Utah, was first considered in the late 1940s when Dr. Ray E. Marsell, geologist consultant for the Utah Water and Power Board, recommended the project to the Salt Lake City Commission. Interest in the project was rekindled in 1983 when East 1300 South in Salt Lake City was flooded for the second time in 31 years.

The Little Dell Reservoir dam is a rolled earthfill structure. It has a maximum height of 224 feet (68 m) above the streambed and is 1,700 feet (520 m) in length.

The recreation area at Little Dell is located near the site of a historic Pony Express station run by Utah pioneer Ephraim Hanks in the mid-19th century. Known as Little Dell Station, it was situated about 1,000 feet (300 m) northeast of the northernmost tip of the reservoir. The site was listed on the National Register of Historic Places in 1971.

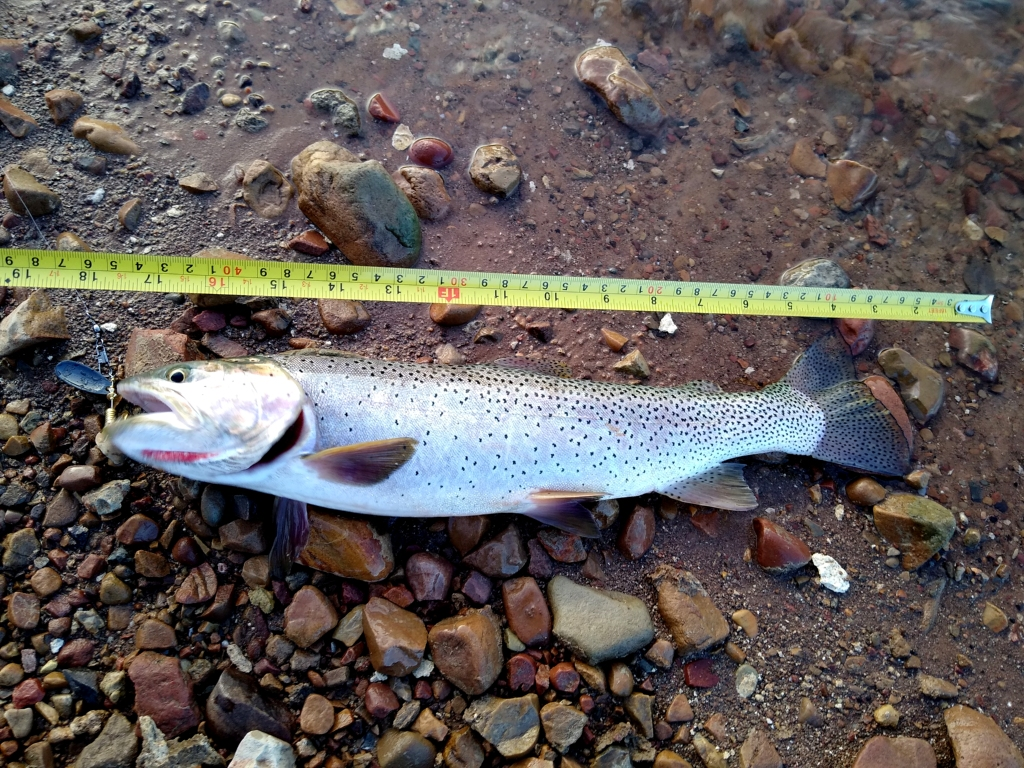
A typical example of a Bonneville cutthroat trout from Little Dell reservoir, 2020

Unlike nearby Mountain Dell Reservoir—which was drained in 2019 to accommodate repairs on the Mountain Dell Dam—fishing at Little Dell is currently allowed, but with restrictions. Worms, salmon eggs, cheeses, power baits, pickled minnows, and other forms of organic bait are off-limits. Anglers are allowed to use spinners, spoons, poppers, jerk baits, soft plastics, wet and dry flies, or any other artificial lure. Little Dell contains Brook trout, Brown trout, and is best known for a brood stock of healthy native Bonneville cutthroat trout. Anglers are not allowed to keep any Bonneville cutthroats caught at Little Dell, and all Bonneville cutthroat must be released as part of a Utah state program to protect and promote this specific cutthroat species. Little Dell's population of Bonneville cutthroats have become renowned for their size, given the reservoir's location so close to Salt Lake City. Shore fishing can be done virtually any time of the year—though the Little Dell park entrance at the highway may be closed during winter months, anglers and hikers can still walk down to the water's edge from the parking area near the gate. Fishing can also be done from non-motorized small watercraft, such as kayaks, canoes, float tubes, or other non-motorized means. There is a small hand-launch boat ramp at the western endpoint of the asphalt-paved road, which switch-backs from the gate at the highway down to the water below.

Since its creation, Little Dell has become a popular outdoor recreation and picnic spot for residents of Salt Lake County, and beyond. Day access to the reservoir's facilities can be obtained at the gate for a $5.00 fee. The season runs from Memorial Day through October, though, as mentioned for anglers, walk-down access from the parking area outside the gate is year-round.

Little Dell Reservoir can be best viewed from Little Mountain Pass, located at the top of Emigration Canyon.

== See also ==
- List of dams and reservoirs in Utah
