= Utah State Route 67 (disambiguation) =

State Route 67

Location
- Country: United States
- State: Utah

Highway system
- Utah State Highway System; Interstate; US; State; Minor; Scenic
← SR-66	→ SR-68

Utah State Route 67 may refer to the following roads in Utah, United States:

- Utah State Route 67 (Legacy Parkway), a controlled access state highway in southwestern Davis County that connects Interstate 215 with Interstate 15 / U.S. Route 89 and Utah State Route 177
- Utah State Route 67 (1975-1991), a former state highway in northeastern Juab County that ran northwest from Utah State Route 27 (now U.S. Route 6) to Tintic Junction on Utah State Route 36
- Utah State Route 67 (1962-1969), a former state highway in St. George, Utah, United States that included the streets which surrounded Dixie Junior College (now Dixie State University)
- Utah State Route 67 (1931-1962), a former state highway on the northeastern edge of Tooele County and northwestern Salt Lake County in northern Utah, United States that ran from Lake Point Junction east to Salt Lake City

== See also ==
- List of state highways in Utah
- List of highways numbered 67
