= Parleys Canyon =

Canyon in Utah, United States

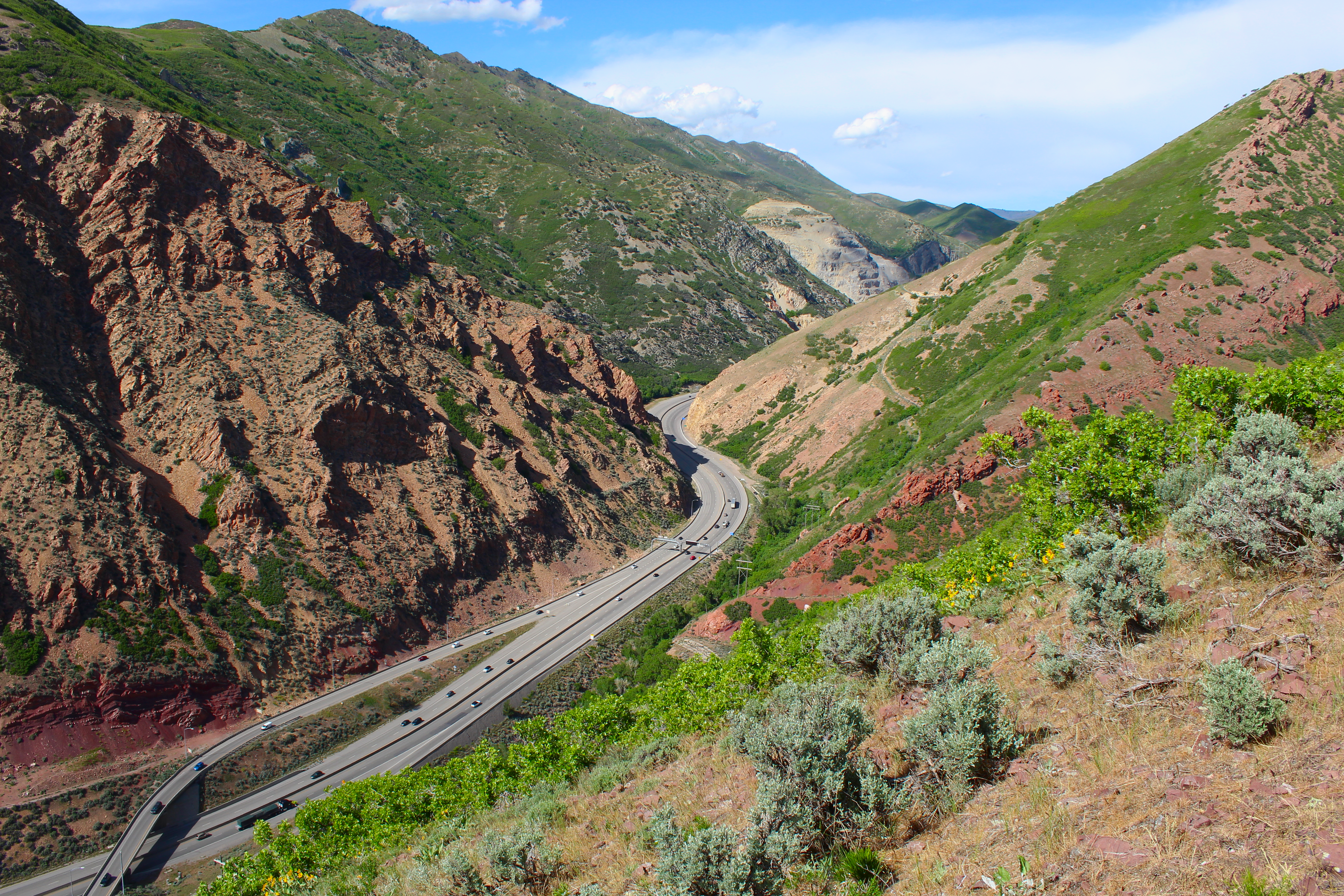
- The mouth of Parleys Canyon, facing East.
- Interactive map of Parleys Canyon
- Traversed by: I-80

Location
- Location: Salt Lake / Summit counties, Utah, United States
- Range: Wasatch Mountains
- Coordinates: 40°42′43″N 111°47′53″W

Parleys Canyon is a canyon located in the U.S. state of Utah. The canyon provides the route of Interstate 80 (I-80) (and previously the Lincoln Highway, U.S. Route 40, and a railroad) up the western slope of the Wasatch Mountains and is a relatively wide, straight canyon other than near its mouth. The mountain pass at the top of the canyon is known as Parleys Summit. With an elevation of 7,120 feet (2,170 m), the pass is the highest point along I-80 in the state of Utah. Both features are named for Parley P. Pratt, an early settler of the Salt Lake Valley and leader of the Church of Jesus Christ of Latter-day Saints who surveyed the area to find a better transportation route through the Wasatch Mountains than the previous route which traversed Emigration Canyon.

== Description ==
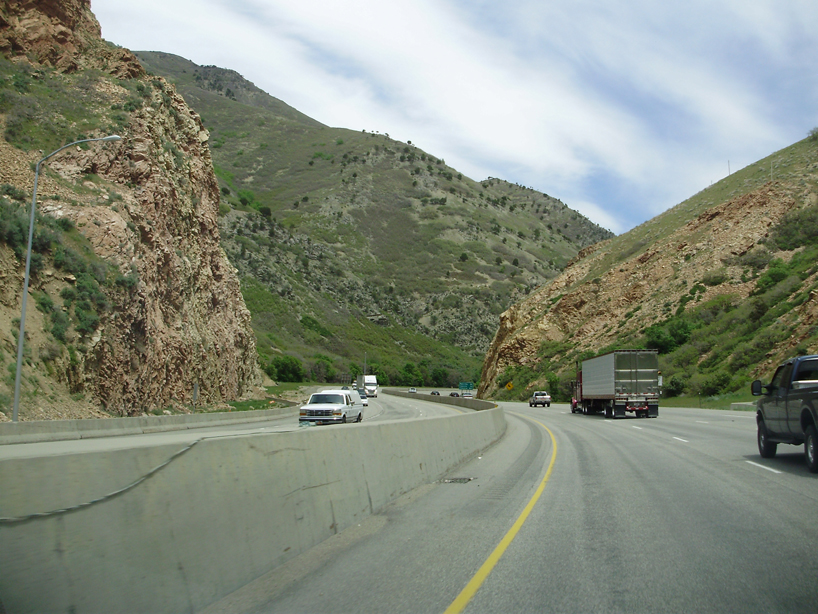
View along Interstate 80 eastbound in Parleys Canyon

Parleys Canyon begins where I-215 merges into I-80 in Salt Lake City and ends at Parleys Summit. The lower part of the canyon is relatively twisty and narrow and had to be dynamited to make way for I-80. Despite this, the interstate remains six or more lanes wide throughout the canyon; it is built over Parleys Creek in many places. Work is also underway to extend the Parleys Trail multi-use path through this segment to improve non-motorized access.

The canyon widens dramatically near Mountain Dell Dam and Utah State Route 65 (SR-65) splits from the freeway (which turns southeast temporarily) to provide access to Morgan County to the northeast. SR-65 also provides a connection to a local road leading over the ridge to Emigration Canyon in the same area where the Mormon trail crossed into that canyon. Little Dell Dam can be seen higher up on the side of Parleys Canyon in this area. As the freeway turns back toward the east, there is also an exit for the road leading up Lambs Canyon (a side canyon of Parleys Canyon).

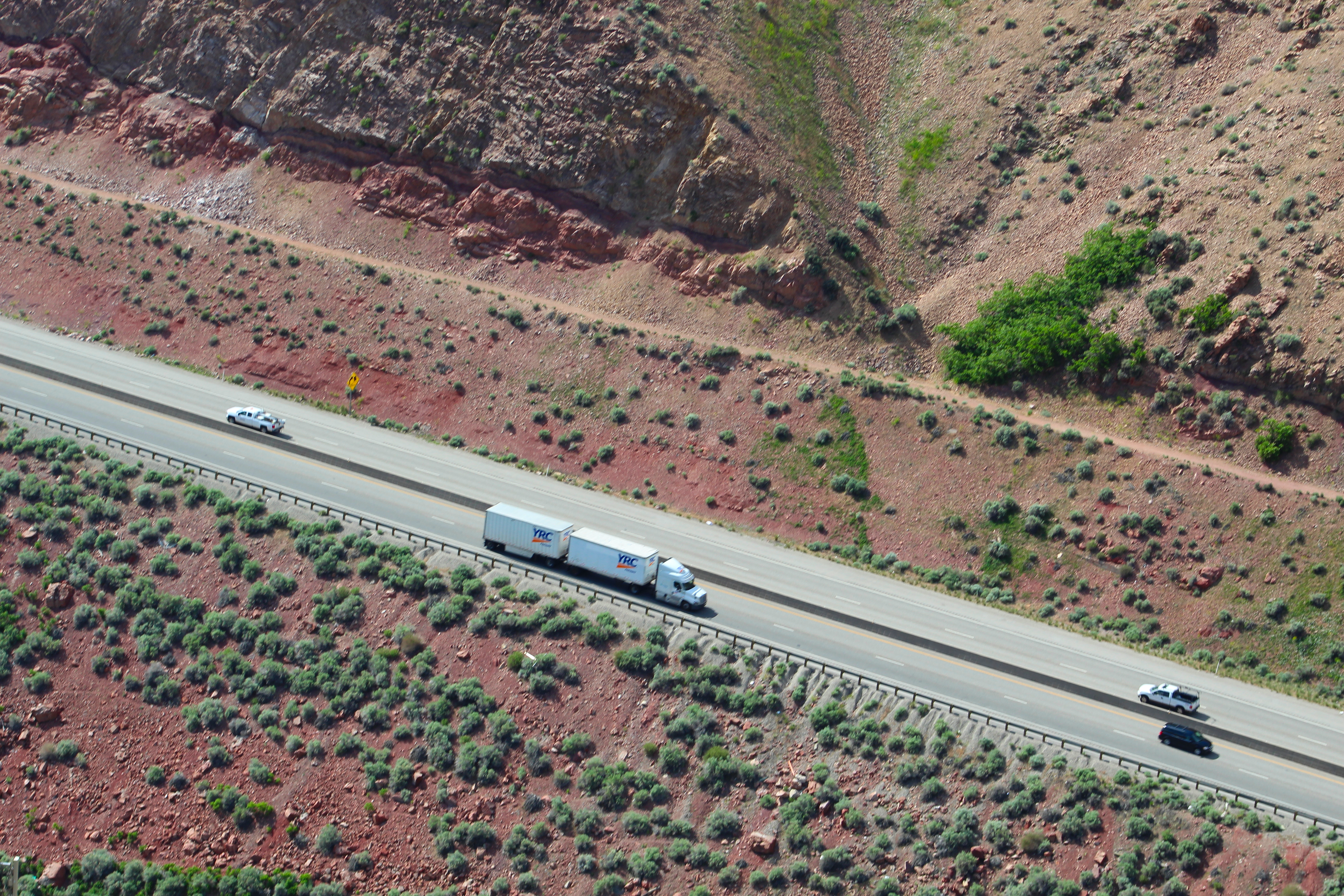
Parleys Canyon, facing Northwest

The area around Parleys Summit is part of the Summit Park census-designated place (CDP). However, this area is more commonly referred to as Jeremy Ranch or Parleys Summit. Here the canyon is wide enough to form large communities along the sides of the freeway along the gentle mountain slopes. On the other side of the summit the freeway continues into the Snyderville Basin, which is where the popular resort town of Park City is located. Also within the basin is the ski jump built for the 2002 Winter Olympic Games and the large shopping district at Kimball Junction.

=== Wildlife crossing ===
A $5m wildlife overpass was completed in December 2018 to allow wildlife to cross I-80 safely. The overpass is 50 feet wide and 320 feet long; animals near that location by exit 140 are funneled onto the overpass with 3.5 miles of fencing.

Parleys Canyon, from I215 & I-80 to Kimball Junction

== Climate ==
Climate data for Parley's Summit, Utah, 2004–2020 normals: 7500ft (2286m)
Month	Jan	Feb	Mar	Apr	May	Jun	Jul	Aug	Sep	Oct	Nov	Dec	Year
Record high °F (°C)	64 (18)	58 (14)	69 (21)	74 (23)	81 (27)	87 (31)	88 (31)	88 (31)	84 (29)	77 (25)	66 (19)	57 (14)	88 (31)
Mean maximum °F (°C)	48.9 (9.4)	49.6 (9.8)	57.7 (14.3)	64.4 (18.0)	72.6 (22.6)	78.9 (26.1)	84.8 (29.3)	83.2 (28.4)	78.2 (25.7)	68.1 (20.1)	57.9 (14.4)	48.8 (9.3)	85.3 (29.6)
Mean daily maximum °F (°C)	34.5 (1.4)	36.0 (2.2)	43.9 (6.6)	48.8 (9.3)	56.7 (13.7)	67.0 (19.4)	76.4 (24.7)	75.4 (24.1)	66.2 (19.0)	52.3 (11.3)	42.0 (5.6)	32.5 (0.3)	52.6 (11.5)
Daily mean °F (°C)	27.2 (−2.7)	28.0 (−2.2)	35.2 (1.8)	39.7 (4.3)	47.5 (8.6)	56.8 (13.8)	65.6 (18.7)	64.6 (18.1)	56.2 (13.4)	43.9 (6.6)	34.6 (1.4)	25.6 (−3.6)	43.7 (6.5)
Mean daily minimum °F (°C)	19.8 (−6.8)	20.0 (−6.7)	26.4 (−3.1)	30.6 (−0.8)	38.4 (3.6)	46.6 (8.1)	54.8 (12.7)	53.8 (12.1)	46.3 (7.9)	35.6 (2.0)	27.1 (−2.7)	18.7 (−7.4)	34.8 (1.6)
Mean minimum °F (°C)	1.4 (−17.0)	3.4 (−15.9)	13.6 (−10.2)	18.2 (−7.7)	27.4 (−2.6)	33.2 (0.7)	46.4 (8.0)	44.2 (6.8)	32.2 (0.1)	20.0 (−6.7)	8.8 (−12.9)	1.1 (−17.2)	−4.2 (−20.1)
Record low °F (°C)	−9 (−23)	−15 (−26)	2 (−17)	10 (−12)	20 (−7)	24 (−4)	38 (3)	35 (2)	26 (−3)	−2 (−19)	−2 (−19)	−12 (−24)	−15 (−26)
Average precipitation inches (mm)	3.95 (100)	3.48 (88)	3.63 (92)	4.00 (102)	2.70 (69)	1.37 (35)	0.82 (21)	1.16 (29)	1.98 (50)	2.83 (72)	3.42 (87)	3.85 (98)	33.19 (843)
Average snowfall inches (cm)	34.00 (86.4)	25.50 (64.8)	20.90 (53.1)	15.70 (39.9)	3.10 (7.9)	0.50 (1.3)	0.00 (0.00)	0.00 (0.00)	0.90 (2.3)	5.70 (14.5)	15.50 (39.4)	31.10 (79.0)	152.9 (388.6)
Source 1: XMACIS2
Source 2: NOAA (Snyderville snowfall)

== History ==
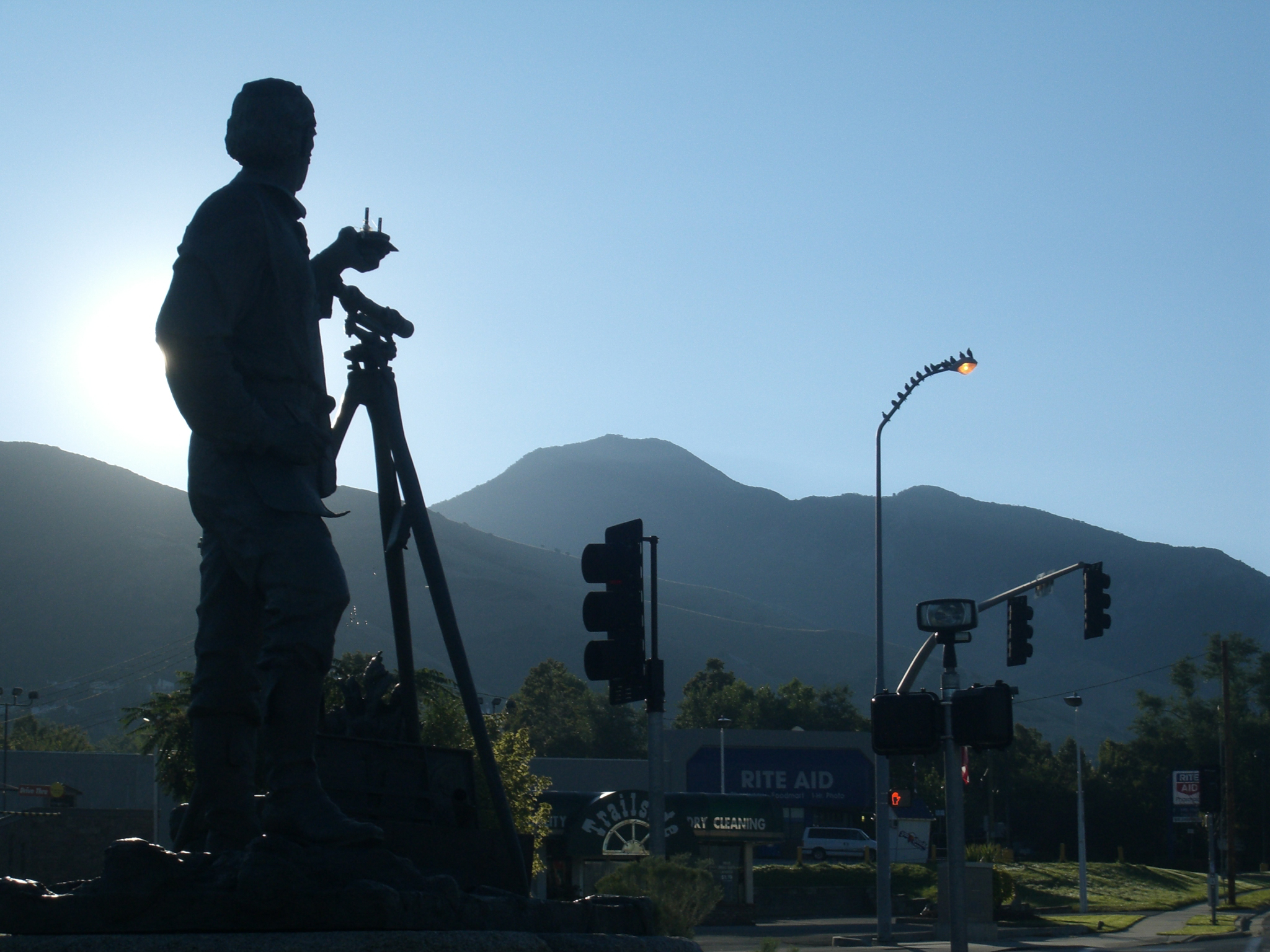
Statue of Parley P. Pratt facing Parleys Canyon at dawn

The canyon receives its name from Parley P. Pratt who was assigned to explore the canyon, called Big Canyon at the time, and to build a toll road, called the Golden Pass Toll Road. Construction on the road started in 1848 and was completed in 1850. The road through Parleys Canyon became the primary route into the Salt Lake Valley, surpassing the original route through Emigration Canyon.

Later, in 1881, the canyon was used by a narrow gauge branchline owned by the Denver & Rio Grande Western Railway from Salt Lake to Park City (the Salt Lake and Park City Railway). However, with its steep grades the line struggled to compete with the Union Pacific's line (via Coalville, connecting to the UP main at Echo). The line was eventually rebuilt to standard gauge by the Rio Grande Western who along with their successor the Denver & Rio Grande Western Railroad, operated trains up into the canyon until 1956. Some remnants of the Rio Grande line through Parleys Canyon, namely the cuts for the horseshoe curves, are in use by local roads and visible off the shoulder of the freeway. A lower portion of the same railroad line outside of Parley's Canyon, remains in use in the present day as the right of way for the UTA S-Line streetcar.
