= Lost Creek Dam =

Lost Creek Dam may refer to:

- Lost Creek Dam (California), downstream of the Sly Creek Dam along Lost Creek
- Lost Creek Dam (Oregon), on the Lost Creek Lake
- Lost Creek Dam (Tennessee), a project of the Tennessee Valley Authority on the Beech River
- Lost Creek Dam (Texas), a dam in Jacksonboro, Texas
- Lost Creek Dam (Morgan County, Utah), a dam in Morgan County, Utah
