= Huntington Park (disambiguation) =

Huntington Park may refer to:

- Huntington Park, California, a city in Los Angeles County
- Huntington Park (Newport News, Virginia), a park in Newport News, Virginia
- Huntington Park (Columbus, Ohio), a minor league baseball stadium in Columbus, Ohio
- Mount Rubidoux, a city park in Riverside, California, formerly known as Huntington Park
- Huntington State Park, a state park of Utah
- Huntington Park (San Francisco), the most prominent park on the city's Nob Hill
- Huntington Park, New Zealand, a suburb of Auckland
