= Lost Creek State Park (Utah) =

State park in Morgan County, Utah, United States

- Location within Utah Location within the United States
- Location: Morgan County, Utah; United States
- Nearest town: Henefer, Utah
- Coordinates: 41°11′09″N 111°22′55″W
- Established: March 16, 2021
- Named for: Lost Creek Reservoir
- Visitors: 93 (in 2022)
- Operator: Utah Division of State Parks & Recreation
- Website: stateparks.utah.gov/parks/lost-creek/

Lost Creek State Park is a state park in northeastern Morgan County, Utah, United States, about 13 miles (21 km) northeast of city of Henefer and about 10 miles (16 km) northeast of the unincorporated community of Croydon, Utah.

== Description ==
The park is located at the Lost Creek Reservoir and is currently under development. It is anticipated to include "modern campgrounds, restrooms, entrance, and trailheads". As of September 2021, "all areas of this park remain in an extremely primitive state". However, there are vault toilets at several locations and a concrete boat ramp on the south side of the Trail Creek/Francis Canyon (southern) arm of the reservoir. One anticipated change to the area is that hunting will be limited to waterfowl.

Access to the park is by way of Utah State Route 158 (via Exit 111 on Interstate 80), then by either North 5800 East or North 6900 East, in or near Croydon. (The former street becomes Lost Creek Road and the north end of the later street is at Lost Creek Road.) Lost Creek Road is asphalt paved past the Lost Creek Dam.

== History ==
Legislation in March 2021 created the park (as well as the Utahraptor State Park in Grand County). However, it appears that years prior to the establishment of the current park, there existed either a former Lost Creek State Park (at the same reservoir) or there were well developed plans for the same, since the Lost Creek State Park appeared on United States Geological Survey (USGS) maps as early as 1991. In addition, the USGS's Geographic Names Information System included the park (with an alternate name of Lost Creek Lake State Beach) by not later than June 1, 2018.

== See also ==
- List of Utah State Parks
