= Utah State Route 85 (disambiguation) =

State Route 85

Location
- Country: United States
- State: Utah

Highway system
- Utah State Highway System; Interstate; US; State; Minor; Scenic
← SR-84	→ SR-86

Utah State Route 85 may refer to:

- The Mountain View Corridor (State Route 85), a state highway in northwestern Utah County, and western Salt Lake County, Utah, United States
- Utah State Route 85 (1962-1977), a former state highway in southeastern Box Elder and Cache counties, Utah, United States, that ran northeasterly from I-15 near Brigham City to the Idaho border near Franklin, Idaho
- Utah State Route 85 (1945-1953), a former state highway in south-central Box Elder County, Utah, United States, that ran east from SR-41 (now SR-13) in Riverside to SR-154

== See also ==
- List of state highways in Utah
- List of highways numbered 85
