= Newton Dam =

- Newton Reservoir (Historic)
- U.S. National Register of Historic Places
- Location within Utah Location within the United States
- Location: Newton, Utah; United States
- Area: 170 acres (69 ha)
- Built: 1871
- NRHP reference No.: 73001860
- Added to NRHP: November 30, 1973

Newton Dam is an earthen dam about a mile north of Newton, in Cache County, Utah, United States.

== Description ==
Original construction here dates from an earthen water-control project of 1872, built by LDS pioneers with ox and horsedrawn scrapers, the first large irrigation project in Utah and a contender for the first in the entire United States. That structure was replaced by the United States Bureau of Reclamation, a mile and a half downstream, in 1941-1946.

The dam is 101 feet high and contains 5,600 acre-feet of water. The impoundment of Clarkston Creek forms a reservoir of 350 surface acres, owned by the Bureau of Reclamation, and operated by the local Newton Water Users Association.

== Historic dam and reservoir ==
The original dam and reservoir were added to the National Register of Historic Places in 1973 as Newton Reservoir. Originally built in 1871-1872 and rebuilt after wash-outs in 1874, 1877, and 1888, the dam was lined with rock and raised three feet in 1897. The capacity of the original reservoir was 1566 acre-feet. The location of the original dam is still visible, located at 41.912°N 111.99°W. The historic boundaries start from the old dam and cover a portion of Clarkson Creek to the west.

== See also ==
- List of dams and reservoirs in Utah
- National Register of Historic Places listings in Cache County, Utah
