= Causey Reservoir =

Reservoir in Utah, United States

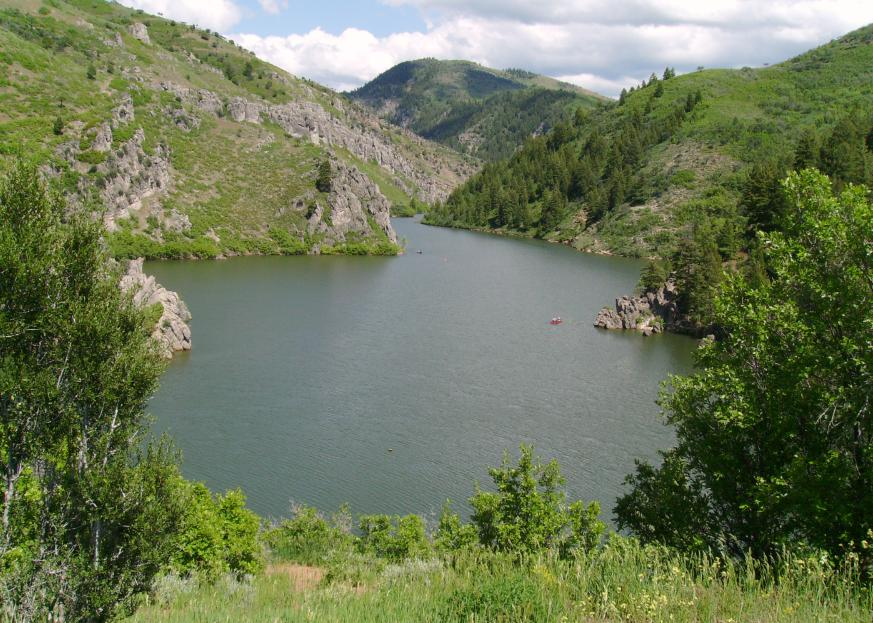

- Location within Utah Location within the United States
- Location: Weber County, Utah
- Coordinates: 41°17′54″N 111°35′14″W
- Type: reservoir
- Primary inflows: South Fork of the Ogden River
- Primary outflows: South Fork of the Ogden River
- Basin countries: United States
- Surface area: 142 acres (57 ha)
- Average depth: 65 ft (20 m)
- Max. depth: 182 ft (55 m)
- Surface elevation: 5,700 ft (1,700 m)
- Dam: Causey Dam

Causey Reservoir is a reservoir located 15 miles (24 km) northeast of Ogden, Utah, United States just off Utah State Route 39.

== Geography ==
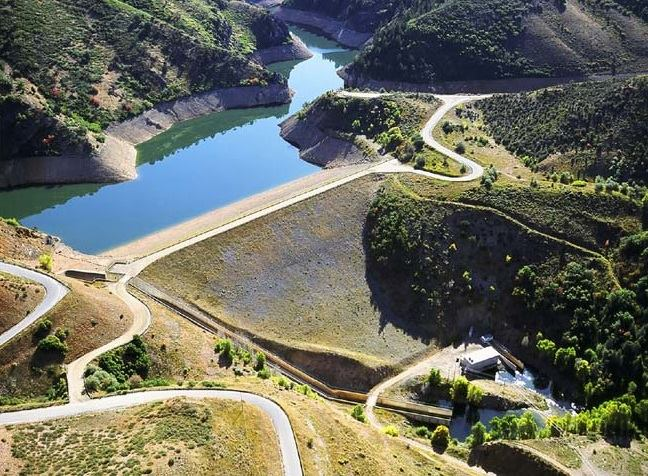
Causey Dam

Causey is a 142-acre (0.57 km^{2}) surface area reservoir on the South Fork of the Ogden River. It is a feature of the Weber Basin Project, and lies at an elevation of about 5,700 feet (1,700 m). The reservoir has a maximum depth of 182 feet (55 m) and a mean depth of 65 feet (20 m).

Causey is located in steep, forested valley terrain and extends into three canyons.

The Weber Basin Water Conservancy District operates the reservoir.

== History ==
Causey Dam was constructed between 1962 and 1966 by the Bureau of Reclamation to provide water to the northern Wasatch front area of Utah. It is an earthfill dam.

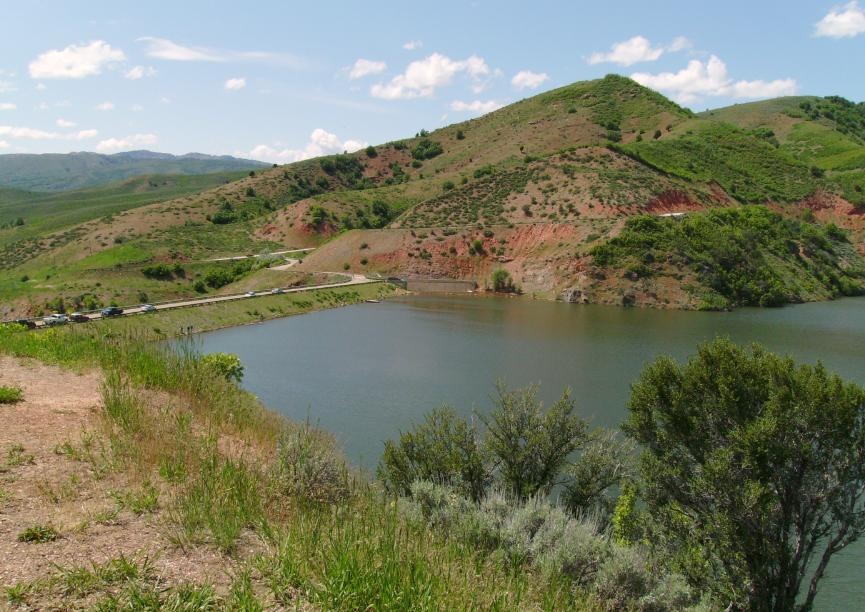
Causey Dam

== Drownings and Deaths ==
A 23 year old male was cliff jumping into the reservoir when he went under the water and failed to resurface. According to the sheriff's department the individual was not wearing a life jacket. The body of the individual was found around 9:10 p.m. on July 19, 2025 by a remote-operated vehicle, the body was later recovered by a dive team.

On March 20, 2020, a 19-year-old male drowned. The Weber County Sheriff's office said the call came in at 2:45 a.m. The body was recovered within an hour.

On August 14, 2015, a group of individuals was cliff jumping at the reservoir. At one point, a person jumped in and didn't surface. The body of the cliff diver was found the next day at approximately 11 a.m.

On September 1, 2007, an 18-year-old exchange student drowned while swimming across a narrow part of the reservoir. The teen's body was found the next day in 121 feet of water.

In August 1989, an airman from Hill Air Force Base drowned while swimming to a popular cliff jumping location.

In July 1988, a 17-year-old boy drowned while trying to swim to an area to cliff jump. It took over a year for authorities to recover the body.

In July 1976, a 23 year old Salt Lake City Man drowned in Causey Reservoir near Lookout Point. Rescue divers found his body in about 100 feet of water.

== Activities ==
Activities at Causey Reservoir include boating and fishing. There are no dedicated boat-launch facilities, and only wake-less speeds are allowed. Fishing includes Kokanee Salmon and several trout varieties, including rainbow, cutthroat, and brown. Causey is also one of the few places in Utah where spearfishing is allowed. (Note: Always check Utah Fishing regulations because they change from year to year)

Swimming and cliff jumping are also popular.

Camping and picnic sites are available near Memorial Park and along the Ogden River.

Camp Kiesel, a Boy Scout camp, is located on the northern arm of the reservoir.

== See also ==
- List of dams and reservoirs in Utah
