= Joes Valley Dam =

Dam in Emery County, Utah

- Interactive map of Joes Valley Dam
- Country: United States
- Location: Emery County, Utah
- Coordinates: 39°17′20″N 111°16′11″W
- Status: Operational
- Construction began: 1963
- Opening date: 1965
- Designed by: United States Bureau of Reclamation

Dam and spillways
- Height: 192 ft (59 m)
- Length: 750 ft (230 m)

Reservoir
- Surface area: 2 mi^{2} (5.2 km^{2})
- Normal elevation: 6,995 ft (2,132 m)

Joes Valley Dam (National ID # UT10124) is a dam in Emery County, Utah.

The earthen dam was constructed between 1963 and 1965 by the United States Bureau of Reclamation, with a height of 192 feet (59 m) and 750 feet (230 m) long at its crest. It impounds Seely Creek for irrigation and municipal water supply. The dam is owned by the Bureau and operated by the local Emery Water Conservancy District as part of the Emery County Project, which also includes Huntington North Dam.

The reservoir it creates, Joes Valley Reservoir, has a water surface of about 2 square miles (5.2 km^{2}) and a maximum capacity of 54,920 acre-feet (67,740,000 m^{3}). Recreation includes fishing, hunting, boating, camping and hiking. The site is surrounded by the Manti-La Sal National Forest.

== Climate ==
Red Pine Ridge is a SNOTEL weather station 9 miles (14 km) north of Joes Valley Reservoir.

Climate data for Red Pine Ridge, Utah, 2005–2020 normals: 9009ft (2746m)
| Month | Jan | Feb | Mar | Apr | May | Jun | Jul | Aug | Sep | Oct | Nov | Dec | Year |
|---|---|---|---|---|---|---|---|---|---|---|---|---|---|
| Mean daily maximum °F (°C) | 35.4 (1.9) | 35.8 (2.1) | 42.2 (5.7) | 47.0 (8.3) | 54.5 (12.5) | 65.6 (18.7) | 72.0 (22.2) | 69.8 (21.0) | 62.8 (17.1) | 50.9 (10.5) | 42.0 (5.6) | 33.6 (0.9) | 51.0 (10.5) |
| Daily mean °F (°C) | 23.2 (−4.9) | 23.3 (−4.8) | 29.2 (−1.6) | 34.6 (1.4) | 42.2 (5.7) | 51.4 (10.8) | 57.9 (14.4) | 55.8 (13.2) | 49.0 (9.4) | 39.2 (4.0) | 30.1 (−1.1) | 22.1 (−5.5) | 38.2 (3.4) |
| Mean daily minimum °F (°C) | 11.0 (−11.7) | 10.9 (−11.7) | 16.1 (−8.8) | 22.3 (−5.4) | 29.9 (−1.2) | 37.3 (2.9) | 43.8 (6.6) | 41.8 (5.4) | 35.2 (1.8) | 27.4 (−2.6) | 18.1 (−7.7) | 10.6 (−11.9) | 25.4 (−3.7) |
| Average precipitation inches (mm) | 3.44 (87) | 3.16 (80) | 3.06 (78) | 3.10 (79) | 2.21 (56) | 1.01 (26) | 1.47 (37) | 1.83 (46) | 2.03 (52) | 2.41 (61) | 2.86 (73) | 3.36 (85) | 29.94 (760) |
Source 1: XMACIS2
Source 2: NOAA (Precipitation)
