= Utahraptor State Park =

State park in Grand County, Utah, United States

- Location within Utah Location within the United States
- Location: Grand County, Utah; United States
- Nearest town: Moab, Utah
- Coordinates: 38°42′47″N 109°42′04″W
- Area: 6,500 acres (26 km^{2})
- Established: March 16, 2021
- Named for: Utahraptor
- Operator: Utah Division of State Parks & Recreation
- Website: stateparks.utah.gov/parks/utahraptor/

Utahraptor State Park is a state park in Grand County, Utah, United States, about 14 miles (23 km) northwest of Moab.

== Description ==
The park is located east of U.S. Route 191 and west of Arches National Park, and covers 6,500 acres (26 km^{2}). The park contains the Dalton Wells Quarry, which have yielded remains of dinosaurs that have advanced understanding of paleontology, such as those of the giant dromaeosaur dinosaur Utahraptor ostrommaysi. Fossils found in the park include those from the early Cretaceous at least 135 to 110 million years ago, with dinosaurs such as the ornithomimosaur Nedcolbertia, polacanthine Gastonia, and sauropod Moabosaurus.

== History ==
Dalton Wells is also the site of a historic Civilian Conservation Corps camp that was later used as the Moab Isolation Center, an internment camp for Japanese Americans during World War II.

In 1975, palaeontologist Jim Jensen from Brigham Young University dug at the site. In 1993, Jim Kirkland, Robert Gaston, and Donald Burge used fossils from Dalton Wells and elsewhere to describe a new giant raptor, naming it Utahraptor.

In 2001, a large block was excavated, containing several specimens of Utahraptor, representing a large group surrounding an ornithopod dinosaur. In 2013, further research of it began, currently ongoing, overseen by Kirkland.

On March 11, 2021, state legislators passed a bill to create Utahraptor State Park. The law that established the park was sponsored by state representative Steve Eliason. The legislation which created the park also included the establishment of the Lost Creek State Park in Morgan County.

On May 23rd, 2025, the Utahraptor State Park Visitor Center was officially opened to the public. Currently, the Visitor Center displays exhibits about the Civilian Conservation Corps, the Japanese American isolation center, Old Leupp Navajo boarding school, and local paleontology. The exhibit on paleontology includes a skeleton of Utahraptor, the tibia of a Moabosaurus, and fossil casts from other Dalton Wells fauna (such as Gastonia, Hippodraco and the mammal Cifelliodon).

== See also ==
- List of Utah State Parks
