= List of dam removals in Utah =

This is a list of dams in Utah that have been removed as physical impediments to free-flowing rivers or streams.

== Completed removals ==
Dam	Height	Year removed	Location	Watercourse	Watershed
Brighton-North Point Dam		2022	Salt Lake County; 40.67210°N 111.9084°W	Jordan River	Jordan River
Mill Creek Dam	14 ft (4.3 m)	2016	Salt Lake County; 40.699°N 111.7196°W	Mill Creek	Jordan River
Box Elder Creek Dam	50 ft (15 m)	1995	Box Elder County; 41.4459°N 111.916°W	Box Elder Creek	Great Salt Lake
Brush Dam	49 ft (15 m)	1983	Sanpete County; 39.0614°N 111.449°W	North Fork Muddy Creek	Dirty Devil River
Gigliotti Diversion Dam	12 ft (3.7 m)	2023	Carbon County; 39.7014°N 110.8658°W	Price River	Price River
Atlas Mineral Dam	93 ft (28 m)	1994	Grand County; 38.6°N 109.595°W	Tributary to Colorado River	Colorado River
Unnamed dam			Summit County; 40.9275°N 111.2903°W	South Fork Chalk Creek	Weber River
Unnamed dam		2010	Utah County; 40.4469°N 111.6864°W	American Fork River	Utah Lake
Temple of Sinawava Dam		2025	Zion National Park; 37.2861°N 112.9496°W	Virgin River	Virgin River
