= Utah State Route 66 =

State highway in Utah, United States

State Route 66

Route information
- Maintained by UDOT
- Length: 14.346 mi (23.088 km)
- Existed: 1931–present

Major junctions
- South end: SR-65 near East Canyon State Park
- North end: I-84 in Morgan

Location
- Country: United States
- State: Utah

Highway system
- Utah State Highway System; Interstate; US; State; Minor; Scenic
← SR-65	→ SR-67

State Route 66 (SR-66) is a state highway in the U.S. state of Utah, connecting I-84 in the city of Morgan to SR-65 near East Canyon State Park over a distance of about 14.3 miles (23.0 km).

== Route description ==
The route's southern terminus is at its intersection with SR-65 near East Canyon State Park in Morgan County, where it winds to the west along the northern end of the park and East Canyon Reservoir. Heading away from the park, the route turns northwest as it travels through East Canyon, alongside East Canyon Creek.

As the canyon starts opens up and turn to the north, the route continues to follow, passing through Porterville and Richville. Eventually, as East Canyon merges with Weber Canyon, the route enters the city of Morgan] Here, the route intersects I-84, and immediately thereafter takes a right turn to the southeast, travelling approximately 3/4 mile as it parallels the north side of I-84, terminating at the next interchange.

== History ==
State Route 66 was formed on 12 May 1931, connecting the town of Hardscrabble north to Porterville and Morgan. In 1953, the connection from Porterville to Hardscrabble was relinquished from state control. In 1969, the road from Porterville south to the East Canyon Reservoir was transferred from county to state control as a part of an SR-66 extension.

== Major intersections ==
The entire route is in Morgan County.

Location	mi	km	Destinations	Notes
	0.000	0.000	SR-65 – Henefer	Southern terminus
East Canyon State Park	1.550	2.494	SR-306	
Morgan	13.566– 13.629	21.832– 21.934	I-84 – Ogden, Henefer, Evanston	
Morgan	14.309– 14.346	23.028– 23.088	I-84 east – Henefer, Evanston	Northern terminus
1.000 mi = 1.609 km; 1.000 km = 0.621 mi
