= Utah State Route 86 =

State highway in Utah, United States

State Route 86

Route information
- Maintained by UDOT
- Length: 2.141 mi (3.446 km)
- Existed: 1975–present

Major junctions
- West end: I-84 near Henefer
- East end: SR-65 in Henefer

Location
- Country: United States
- State: Utah

Highway system
- Utah State Highway System; Interstate; US; State; Minor; Scenic
← SR-85	→ SR-87

State Route 86 is a state highway in the U.S. state of Utah. It is a short connector road, only 2.1 miles (3.4 km) long, that connects I-84 with SR-65 in the town of Henefer.

== Route description ==
The highway starts at the northeast side access ramps of I-84 at exit 112. From there, it crosses southwest under the interstate and takes an immediate turn southeast. It continues in this direction as main street in Henefer for approximately 2 miles until it terminates at the intersection with SR-65 (East Canyon Road) in the central part of town.

== History ==
From 1935 to 1969, State Route 86 was a different highway, connecting towns in Duchesne County. That highway designation was deleted in 1969.

Prior to 1975, the road currently designated as SR-86 was actually a spur of SR-65; the main route of SR-65 turned southeast to the east Henefer interchange. This spur was redesignated as a distinct state route in 1975.

== Major intersections ==
The entire route is in Henefer, Summit County.

mi	km	Destinations	Notes
0.000	0.000	End State Maintenance sign	Western terminus
0.016– 0.080	0.026– 0.129	I-84 – Ogden, Echo Junction	
2.141	3.446	SR-65 (East Canyon Road)	Eastern terminus
1.000 mi = 1.609 km; 1.000 km = 0.621 mi
