= Porcupine Dam =

Reservoir in Cache County, Utah, United States

Coordinates: 41°31′09″N 111°44′47″W

Porcupine Dam (National ID # UT00251) is a dam in East Canyon in Cache County, Utah, United States.

The earthen dam was constructed in 1964 by the Porcupine Reservoir Company, with a height of 165 feet (50 m) and a length of 665 feet (203 m) at its crest. It impounds the water of the East Fork of the Little Bear River, primarily for irrigation.

The reservoir it creates, Porcupine Reservoir, has a water surface of 190 acres (77 ha), a shoreline of about 4.2 miles (6.8 km), and a maximum capacity of 12,500 acre-feet (15,400,000 m^{3}), with an elevation of 5,381 feet (1,640 m). The lake is popular for fishing, boating, and swimming, although there are no recreational facilities. Overnight camping is not available at the reservoir or below the dam in the canyon. All areas are day-use only.
