= Huntington State Park =

State park in Emery County, Utah, United States

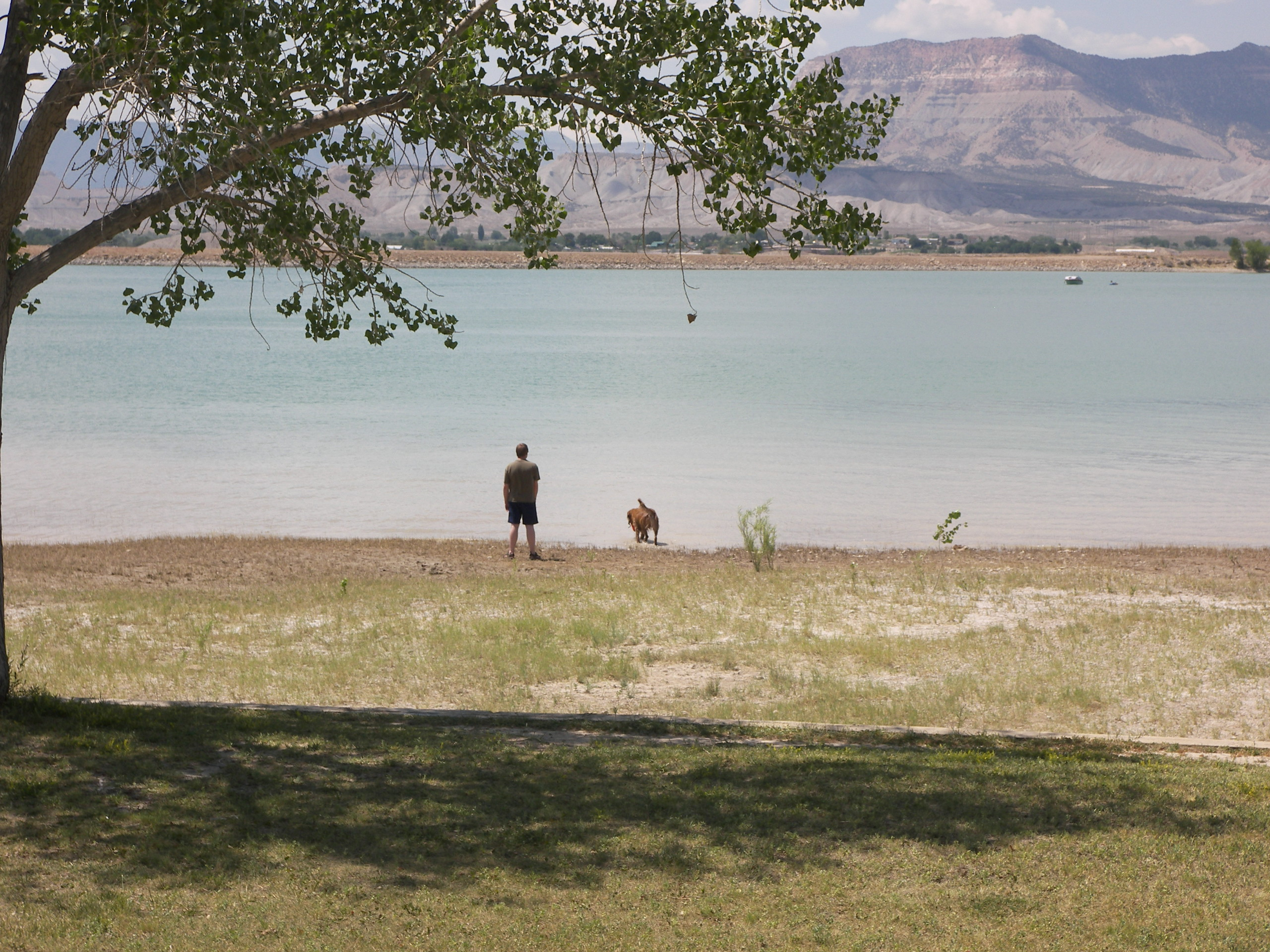

- Location within Utah Location within the United States
- Interactive map of Huntington State Park
- Location: Emery County, Utah, United States
- Coordinates: 39°20′20″N 110°56′51″W
- Area: 111 acres (45 ha)
- Elevation: 5,840 ft (1,780 m)
- Opened: 1966
- Operator: Utah State Parks
- Visitors: 36,166 (in 2025)
- Website: Official website
- Utah State Parks

Huntington State Park is a state park of Utah, United States, featuring a warm-water reservoir. The state park is located near the town of Huntington.

== Description ==
Huntington Reservoir was completed in 1966 by the United States Bureau of Reclamation as part of an Emery County irrigation and recreation project. This warm-water reservoir supports waterskiing, fishing, and crawdad catching. Largemouth bass and bluegill are the most noteworthy fish in this warm-water lake. Many migratory birds, specifically waterfowl, are sighted in this area.

The town of Huntington was founded in 1877. The name of both the town and reservoir honors the three Huntington brothers, Oliver, William, and Dimick, who first explored this area in 1855. Dimick was an interpreter for the local Indians; William was famed as a scout and explorer; and Oliver was an official recorder for the unsuccessful Elk Mountain Mission to Moab.

== See also ==
- List of Utah State Parks
