= Kolob Creek Dam =

Coordinates: 37°25′54″N 113°02′52″W

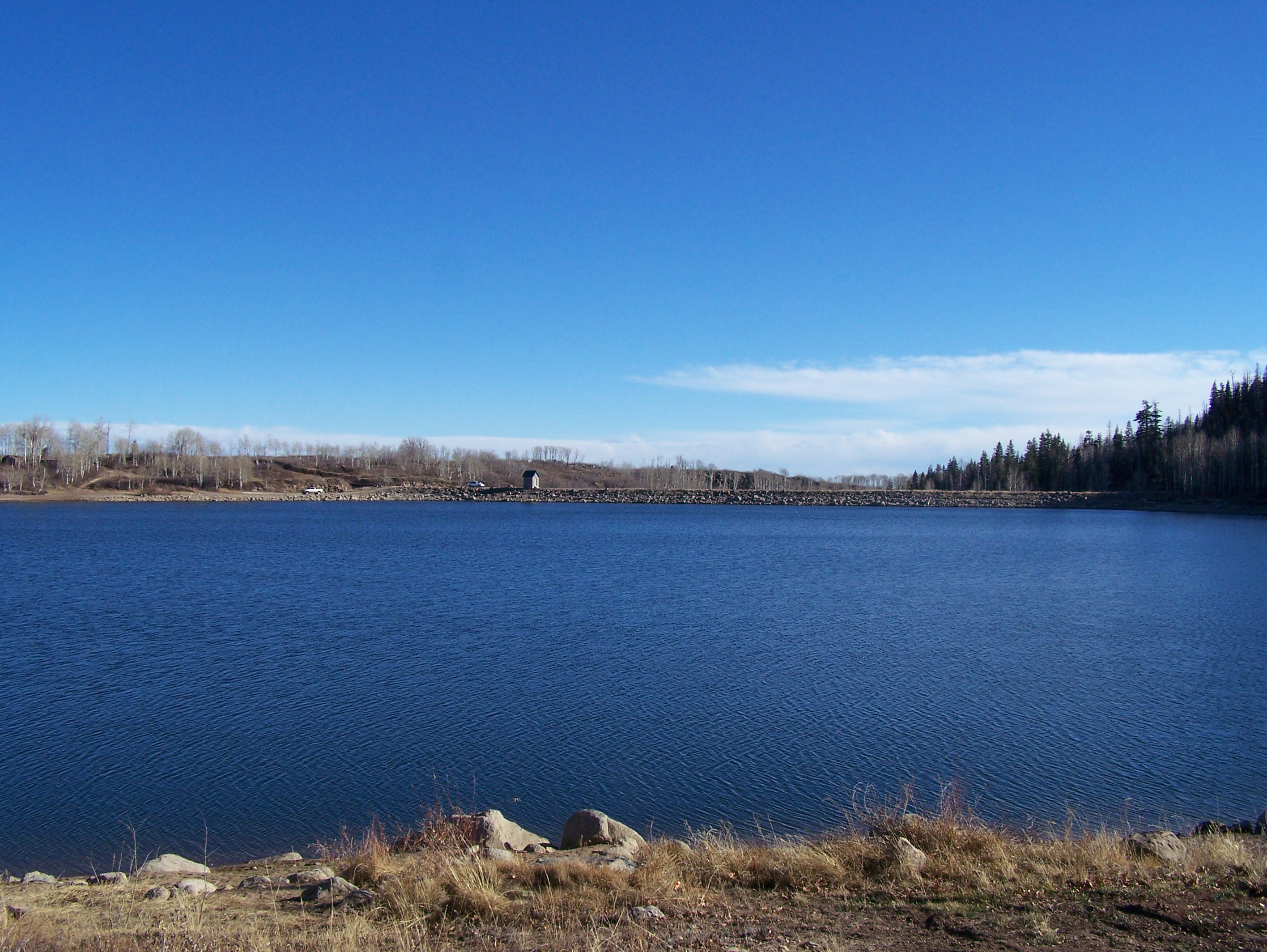
- Kolob Reservoir, a view towards the dam
- Interactive map of Kolob Creek Dam
- Country: United States
- Location: Washington County, Utah
- Purpose: Multi-purpose
- Status: Operational
- Opening date: 1956
- Built by: Hurricane Canal Company; Washington Fields Canal Company
- Owner: Washington County Water Conservancy District
- Operator: Washington County Water Conservancy District

Dam and spillways
- Type of dam: Earth fill dam
- Impounds: Kolob Creek
- Height (foundation): 67 feet (20 m)
- Length: 686 feet (209 m)

Reservoir
- Creates: Kolob Reservoir
- Total capacity: 6,914 acre-feet (8,528,000 m^{3})
- Surface area: 249 acres (101 ha)
- Maximum water depth: 51 feet (16 m)
- Normal elevation: 8,117 feet (2,474 m)

Kolob Creek Dam (National ID # UT00164) is a dam in Washington County, Utah.

The earthen dam was constructed in 1956 by the Hurricane Canal Company and Washington Fields Canal Company, with a height of 67 feet, and a length of 686 feet at its crest. It impounds Kolob Creek for flood control and irrigation water storage. The dam is now owned and operated by the local Washington County Water Conservation District.

The reservoir it creates, Kolob Reservoir, has a water surface of 249 acres, and a maximum capacity of 6914 acre-feet. Recreation is limited. In the winter, the reservoir is only accessible by snowmobile. The reservoir is surrounded by private land, so camping is only allowed near the lake, and fences mark the start of private land on almost all the reservoir shores. Fishing is allowed under special regulations.

Through the 2000s the Conservation District continued to develop the reservoir's size and recreational facilities. Technical climbers in the rugged, downstream slot canyon along Kolob Creek in Zion National Park are advised to contact the Conservation District for its water release schedule from the dam, because water releases can pose a deadly risk.
