= Lost Creek Dam (Morgan County, Utah) =

Dam in Morgan County, Utah, United States

Coordinates: 41°11′04″N 111°23′54″W

Lost Creek Dam (National ID # UT10125) is a dam in Morgan County, Utah, United States.

== Description ==
The earthen dam was constructed between 1963 and 1966 by the United States Bureau of Reclamation (USBR) with a height of 248 feet (76 m) and 1,078 feet (329 m) long at its crest. It impounds Lost Creek for flood control, part of the Weber Basin Project. The dam is owned by the USBR and is operated by the local Weber Basin Water Conservancy District.

== Lost Creek Reservoir ==
The reservoir it creates, Lost Creek Reservoir, has a total capacity of 22,510 acre-feet with a surface area of 365 acres (148 ha). Recreation includes fishing (rainbow trout and cutthroat trout) and boating. Lost Creek State Park is nearby.

== See also ==
- List of dams and reservoirs in Utah
