= Currant Creek Dam (Utah) =

Reservoir in the state of Utah, United States

- Interactive map of Currant Creek Dam
- Country: United States
- Coordinates: 40°19′59″N 111°03′07″W
- Status: Operational
- Construction began: 1974
- Opening date: 1975
- Built by: United States Bureau of Reclamation
- Designed by: United States Bureau of Reclamation
- Operator: Central Utah Water Conservancy District

Dam and spillways
- Impounds: Currant Creek
- Height: 164 ft (50 m)
- Length: 1,600 ft (490 m)

Reservoir
- Creates: Currant Creek Reservoir
- Total capacity: 15,670 acre-feet (19,330,000 m^{3})
- Surface area: 300 acres (120 ha)
- Normal elevation: 7,684 ft (2,342 m)

Currant Creek Dam (National ID # UT10149) is a dam in Wasatch County, Utah.

The earthen dam was constructed in 1974–1975 by the United States Bureau of Reclamation to a height of 164 feet (50 m) and a length of 1,600 feet (490 m) at its crest. It impounds Currant Creek for flood control and irrigation, part of the Bonneville Unit of the larger Central Utah Project. The dam is owned by the Bureau and is operated by the local Central Utah Water Conservancy District.

The reservoir it creates, Currant Creek Reservoir, has a water surface of 300 acres (121 ha) and a capacity of 15,670 acre-feet (19,330,000 m^{3}). The reservoir shoreline is 85% owned by the Uinta National Forest. Recreation includes fishing (for rainbow, cutthroat, and brook trout, etc.), boating, camping, and hiking.
