= Upper Stillwater Reservoir =

Reservoir in Utah, United States

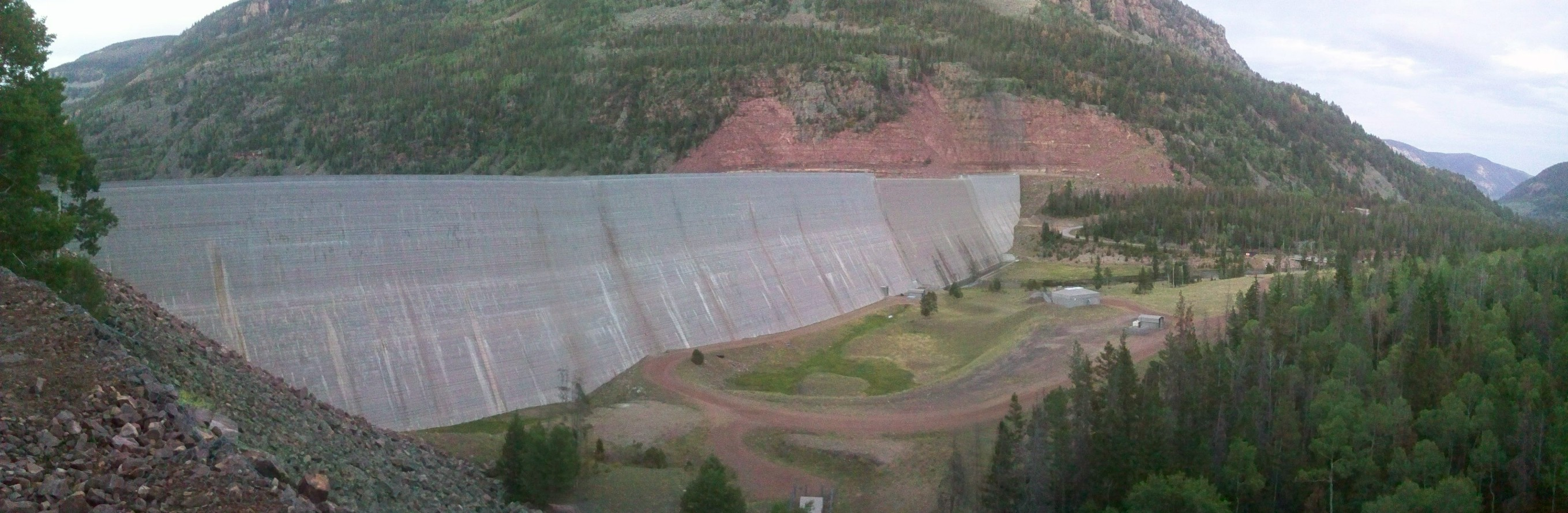
- Looking North East towards Upper Still Water dam

- Location within Utah Location within the United States
- Location: Duchesne County, Utah, United States
- Coordinates: 40°33′35″N 110°41′53″W
- Type: reservoir
- Primary outflows: Rock Creek
- Basin countries: United States
- Max. length: 2,134 m (7,001 ft)
- Max. width: 610 m (2,000 ft)
- Average depth: 31.6 m (104 ft)
- Max. depth: 51 m (167 ft)
- Water volume: 40.857 million cubic metres (33,123 acre⋅ft)
- Shore length^{1}: 5,486 m (17,999 ft)
- Surface elevation: 2,492 m (8,176 ft)
- ^{1} Shore length is not a well-defined measure.

Upper Stillwater Reservoir is a large high mountain reservoir on the south slope of the High Uintas in Duchesne County, Utah. The reservoir is part of the Central Utah Project.

The reservoir was created in 1987 by the construction of a concrete gravity dam (Upper Stillwater Dam). The architecture of the rolled concrete dam is an attraction for engineers.

The reservoir elevation is 8,176 ft, and the mean depth is 103.5 ft. Available fish species include rainbow, brown, and brook trout.

The watershed is primarily the Uinta Mountains, the watershed high point being Ostler Peak (12,717 ft). It is estimated that twice or more the reservoir capacity is diverted towards the Wasatch Front annually. The primary use of the water is for irrigation.

== Recreation ==
The area has two campgrounds, Rock Creek, and upper stillwater Campground. The reservoir serves as a popular trailhead into the High Uintas Wilderness Area, with the boundary only one mile north of the dam near the high water line for the reservoir. Recreation management is under the jurisdiction of the U.S. Forest Service, Ashley National Forest. The managed recreation season is from June through September, with high use on holidays and weekends. Boating, swimming, camping, fishing, hiking, horseback riding, picnicking, recreational vehicle driving, wildlife viewing, and winter sports are popular activities.

== Annual Spill ==
The Stillwater Dam is designed with a steep stepped spillway. During years of high snow or fast melt conditions, the dam may fill until the water elevation reaches the spillway. The spill creates a curtain of falling water 600 feet wide and 200 feet tall. The event typically lasts for a few days and commonly attracts tourist and media attention.

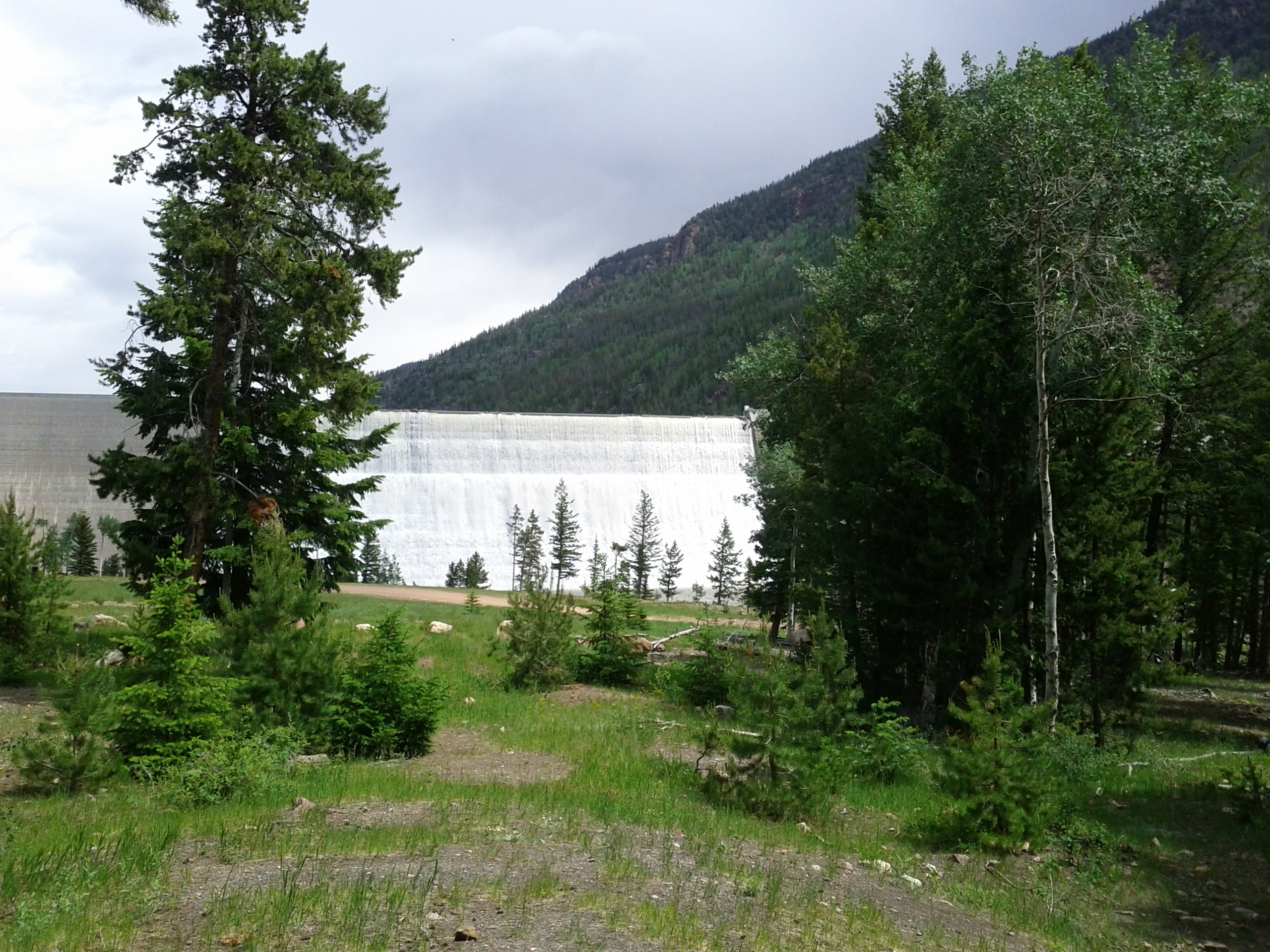
A view of stillwater spilling

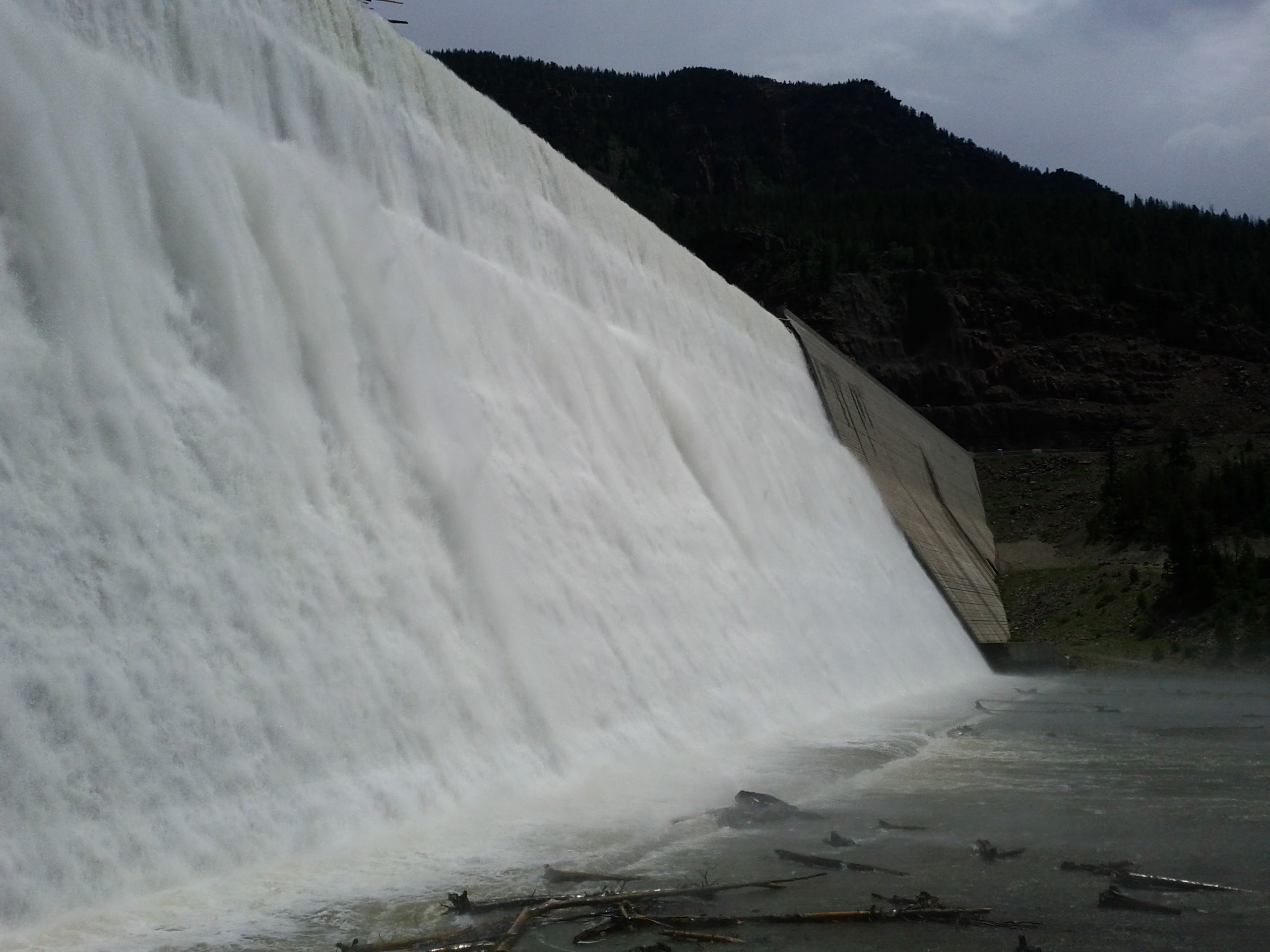
Close up view of the spill.
