= Kolob Reservoir =

Reservoir in the state of Utah, United States

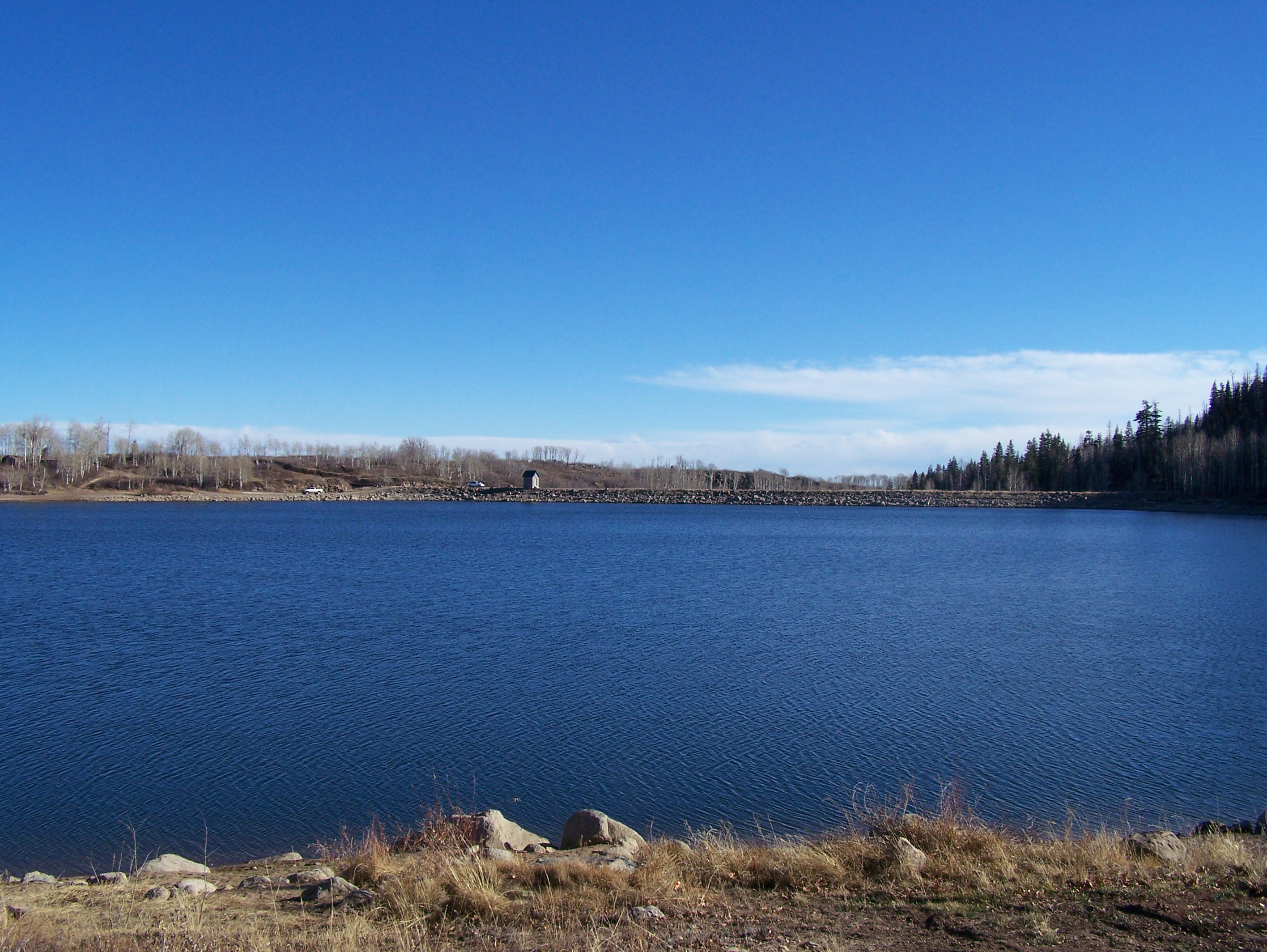
- from north shore, looking SSE, towards the dam

- Location within Utah Location within the United States
- Location: Washington County, Utah, United States
- Coordinates: 37°25′54″N 113°02′52″W
- Type: Reservoir
- Basin countries: United States
- Max. depth: 51 ft (16 m)
- Surface elevation: 8,117 ft (2,474 m)

Kolob Reservoir is a reservoir in southern Utah on Kolob Mountain, created by the 1956 Kolob Creek Dam.

There are two entrances to Kolob: one is in the town of Virgin and the other is near Cedar City, Utah. From December to May snow covers all the roads, and a snowmobile is required for access. The reservoir is surrounded by private land, used for grazing along as the private property so camping is only allowed near the lake. There are fences marking the start of private land on almost all shores of the reservoir. One can fish the reservoir, but there are special regulations.
