= Big Mountain Pass =

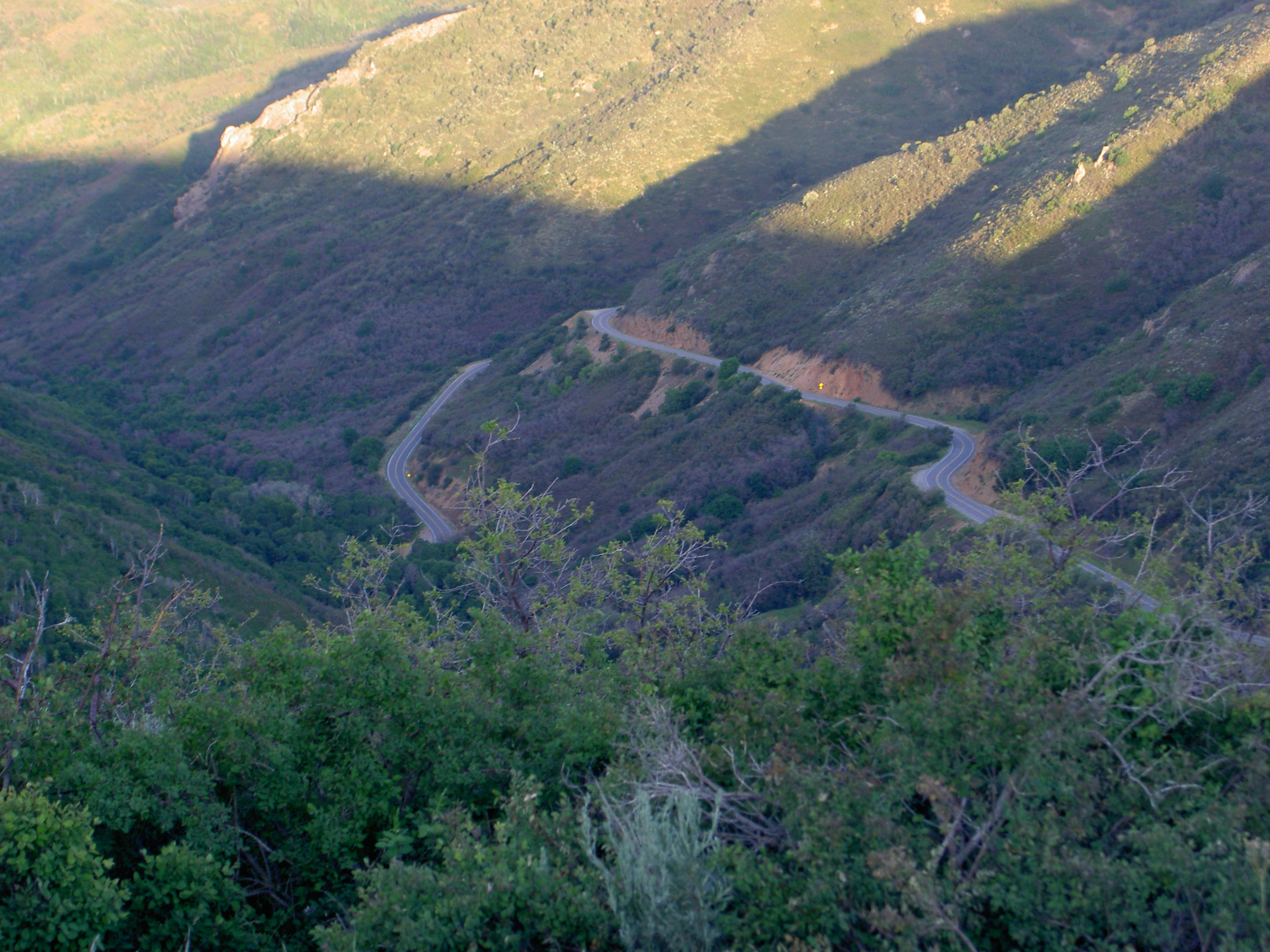
- Interactive map of Big Mountain Pass
- Elevation: 7,420 ft (2,260 m)
- Traversed by: SR-65

Third Approach
- Location: Morgan / Salt Lake counties, Utah, United States
- Range: Wasatch Mountains
- Coordinates: 40°49.680′N 111°39.227′W

Big Mountain Pass is a mountain pass in the Wasatch Mountains in Utah, United States. It has an elevation of 7,420 feet (2,260 m).

It is on the original route of the Mormon pioneers who crossed it in 1847 on their way to the Salt Lake Valley. In 1846, the pass was used by the Donner Party.

The route closes from November to June depending on snowfall in the area.
