= Emigration Canyon, Utah =

- City
- Interactive map of Emigration Canyon, Utah
- Founded: 1846
- Given Township Status: 8 January 1997
- Incorporated as a Metro Township: 2017
- Incorporated as a City: 2024

Government
  - Mayor: Joe Smolka

Area
  - Total: 18.22 sq mi (47.19 km^{2})
  - Land: 18.22 sq mi (47.19 km^{2})
  - Water: 0 sq mi (0.00 km^{2})

Population (2020)
  - Total: 1,466
  - Density: 80.46/sq mi (31.07/km^{2})
- ZIP code: 84108
- Area codes: 385 and 801
- FIPS code: 49-22875
- Website: emigration.utah.gov

- Emigration Canyon
- U.S. National Register of Historic Places
- U.S. National Historic Landmark
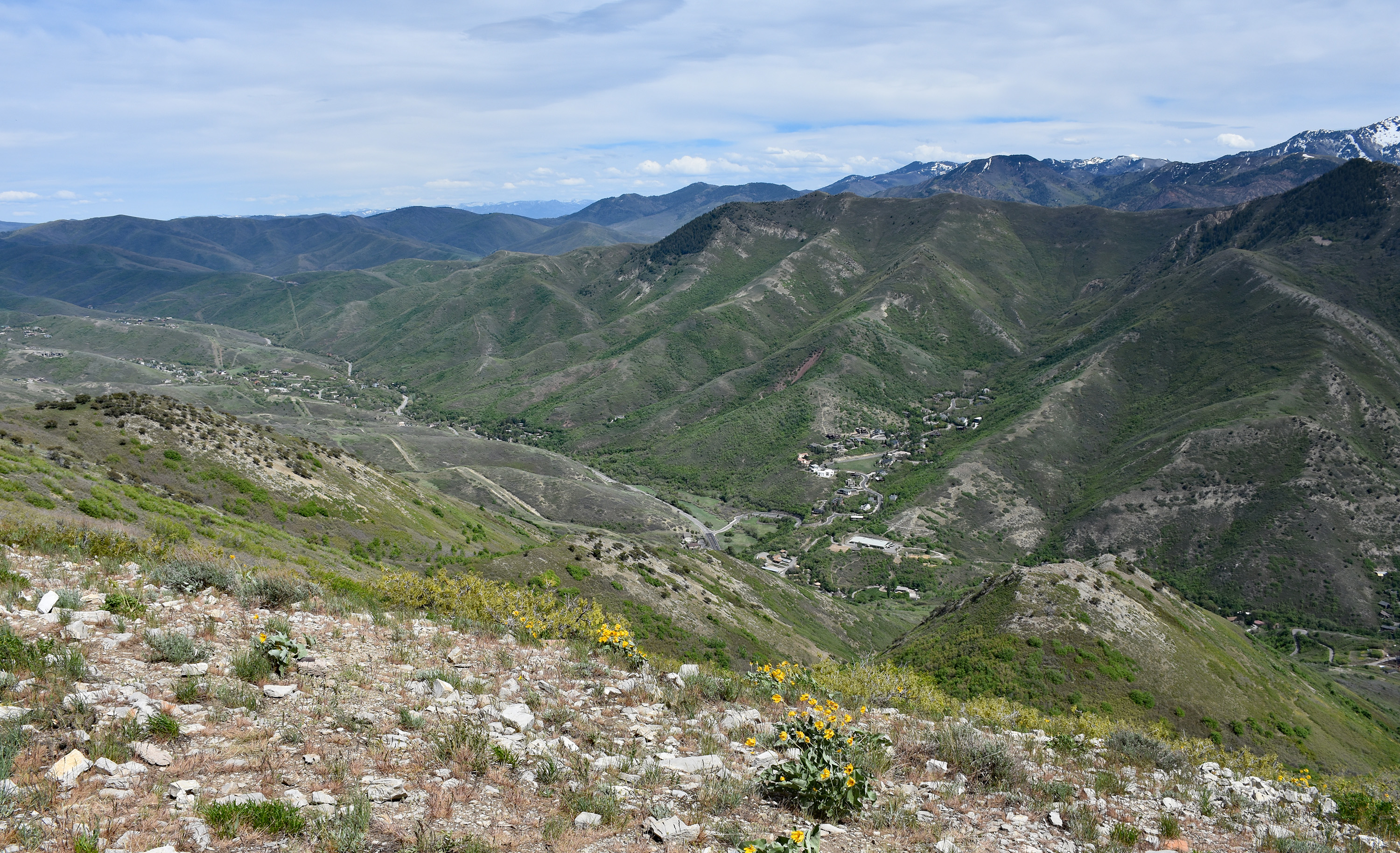
- Emigration Canyon 2020

- Location within Utah Location within the United States
- Location: Salt Lake County, Utah, USA
- Coordinates: 40°46′N 111°46′W
- Area: 25 acres (10 ha) (landmarked area)
- Built: 1847
- NRHP reference No.: 66000737

Significant dates
- Added to NRHP: October 15, 1966
- Designated NHL: January 20, 1961

Emigration Canyon is a city and canyon in Salt Lake County, Utah, United States, located east of Salt Lake City in the Wasatch Range. Beginning at the southern end of the University of Utah, the canyon itself heads east and northeast between Salt Lake City and Morgan County. Its boundaries do not extend to the county line, nor do they encompass all of Emigration Canyon, as parts of it are within Salt Lake City. As of the 2020 census, the population was 1,466.

A portion of Emigration Canyon, located in This Is the Place Heritage Park, was declared a National Historic Landmark in 1961 for the canyon's significance in the Mormon migration of the 19th century.

== Demographics ==
Historical population
Census	Pop.	Note	%±
2010	1,567		—
2020	1,466		−6.4%

== History ==
Emigration Canyon was significant in early Utah history as the original route used by pioneers entering the area. It was part of the Hastings Cutoff route used by the Donner Party in 1846 (not affiliated with the Mormon pioneers) and where the Mormon pioneers entered the Salt Lake Valley in 1847. As Brigham Young looked over the canyon, he declared, "This is the right place. Drive on." These words have become famous in Utah history. The event is commemorated with This Is The Place Heritage Park at the mouth of the canyon. Throughout Emigration Canyon, there are several historic markers designating camps, trail markers, and milestones where the Mormon pioneers passed while on their way to the Salt Lake Valley. One example of these milestones is called Lost Creek Camp.

The township of Emigration Canyon was formed on January 8, 1997.

In 2015, the township's residents voted to incorporate and become a metro township.

In May 2024, Emigration Canyon and all other metro townships were incorporated as cities.

== Local attractions ==
Hogle Zoo, the main zoo in the Salt Lake City area, also lies at the mouth of the canyon but is within Salt Lake City limits. Emigration Canyon is home to Camp Kostopulos, established in 1967 by the Kostopulos Dream Foundation as a summer camp for disabled children, teens, and adults. It is adjacent to the historic Ruth's Diner, established in 1930.

== Cycling ==
Emigration Canyon is one of the most accessible canyon rides from Salt Lake City. With a length of 7.7 miles and an average grade of 5 percent, there are approximately 1,300 feet of elevation gain from the mouth to the top, which cyclists often refer to as "Little Mountain". There is a good shoulder to ride in, and locals are used to bicycling traffic. There are restrooms located at the bottom of the canyon and the top, but these may be closed during the winter months.

== Distance running ==
The canyon is the site of the annual Deseret News Marathon, which takes place on Pioneer Day, a state holiday commemorating the arrival of the Mormon pioneers on July 24, 1847. The race follows the course of the Emigration Canyon from Big Mountain Pass and ends in Salt Lake City at Liberty Park, with a net elevation loss of about 3,150 feet.

== Proposed development ==
Much of Emigration Canyon is protected within the Uinta-Wasatch-Cache National Forest. With its proximity to Salt Lake City, unprotected areas have been of interest to property developers; since 2001, the Utah Open Lands Conservation Association has raised funds to preserve numerous parcels of land in the canyon, totaling over 260 acres (110 ha) as of 2016.

== See also ==
- List of census-designated places in Utah
- Mormon Trail
- List of National Historic Landmarks in Utah
- National Register of Historic Places listings in Salt Lake County, Utah
