= Huntington North Dam =

Reservoir in the state of Utah, United States

- Interactive map of Huntington North Dam
- Country: United States
- Location: Emery County, Utah
- Coordinates: 39°20′30″N 110°56′52″W
- Purpose: Irrigation
- Status: Operational
- Construction began: 1964
- Opening date: 1966
- Built by: United States Bureau of Reclamation
- Owner: United States Bureau of Reclamation
- Operator: Emery Water Conservancy District

Dam and spillways
- Type of dam: Earthen
- Impounds: Huntington Creek
- Height (foundation): 74 ft (23 m)
- Length: 1,907 ft (581 m)

Reservoir
- Creates: Huntington Lake
- Total capacity: 5,420 acre⋅ft (6,690,000 m^{3})
- Surface area: 242 acres (98 ha)
- Normal elevation: 5,837 ft (1,779 m)

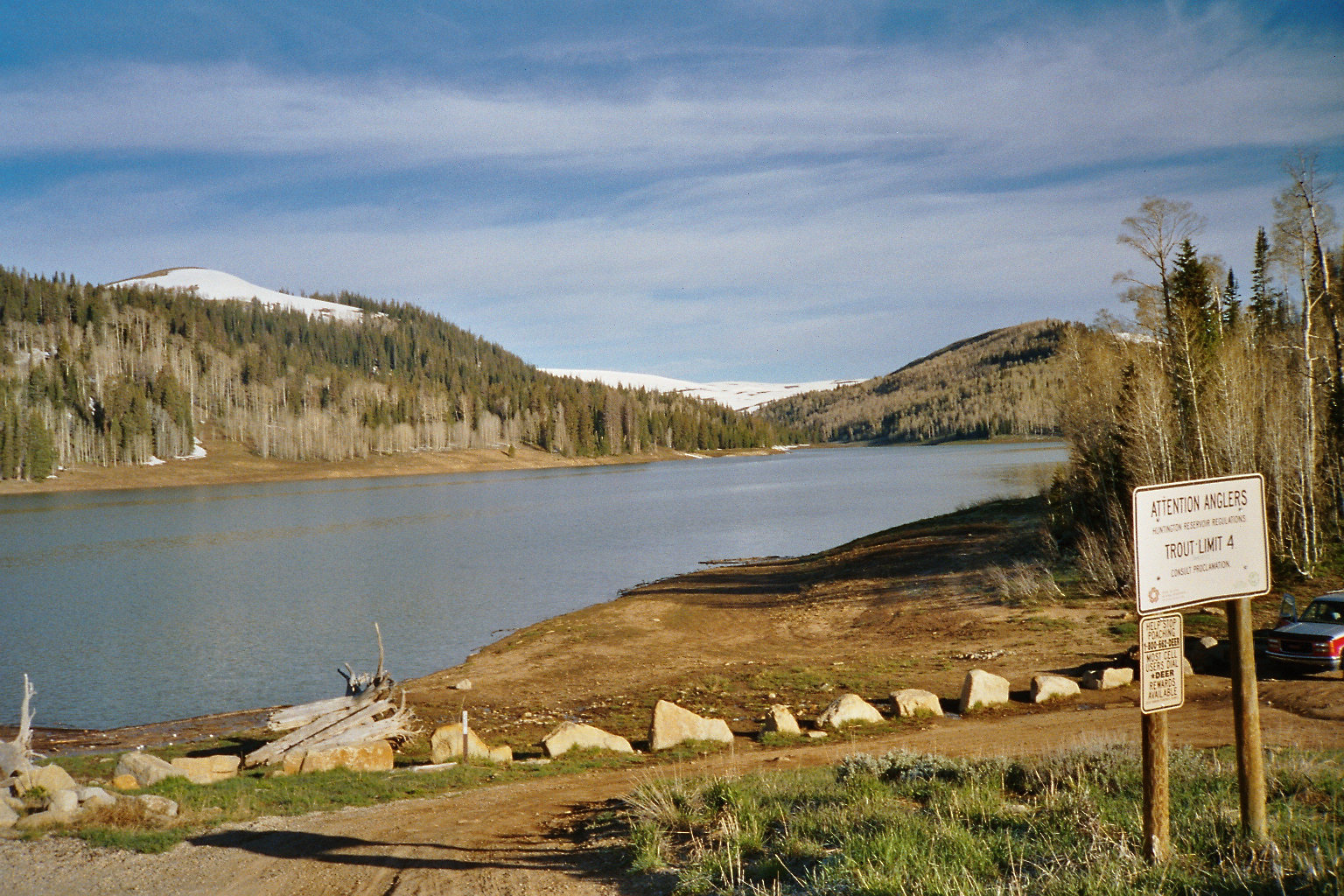
Huntington Lake

Huntington North Dam (National ID # UT10122) is a dam in Emery County, Utah.

The earthen dam was constructed between 1964 and 1966 by the United States Bureau of Reclamation, with a height of 74 feet and a length of 1907 feet at its crest. It impounds Huntington Creek for irrigation water storage as part of the Emery County Project. The dam is owned by the Bureau, and operated by the local Emery Water Conservancy District.

The reservoir it creates, Huntington Lake, has a normal water surface of 242 acres, and a maximum storage capacity of 5,420 acre-feet. Recreation includes camping, boating, hiking, fishing (for bluegill, sunfish, largemouth bass, and rainbow trout) and the facilities of the adjacent Huntington State Park.
