= Mountain Dell Dam =

Dam in Northern Utah

Coordinates: 40°45′02″N 111°43′16″W

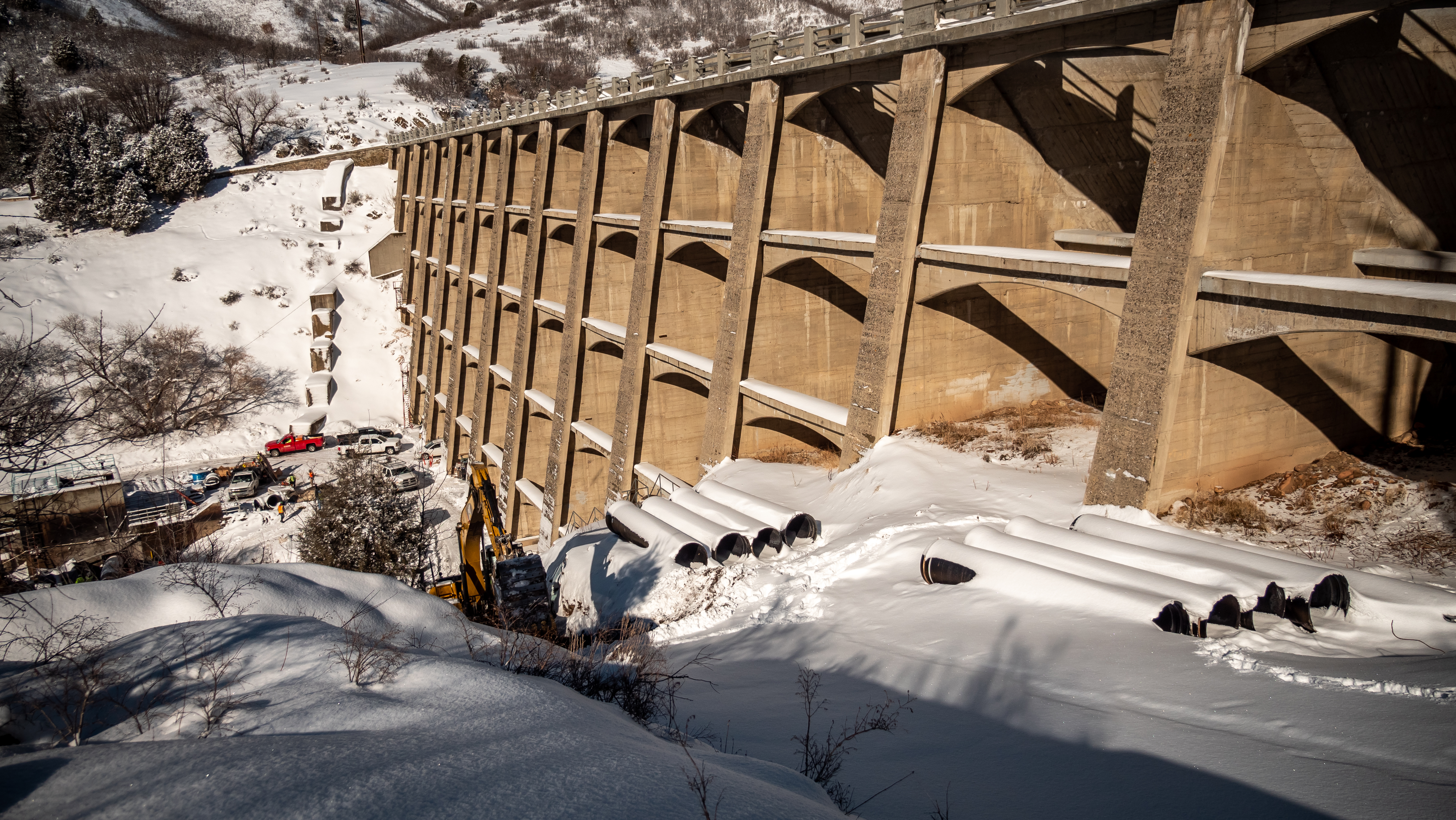
Mountain Dell Dam, Utah. Winter 2019.

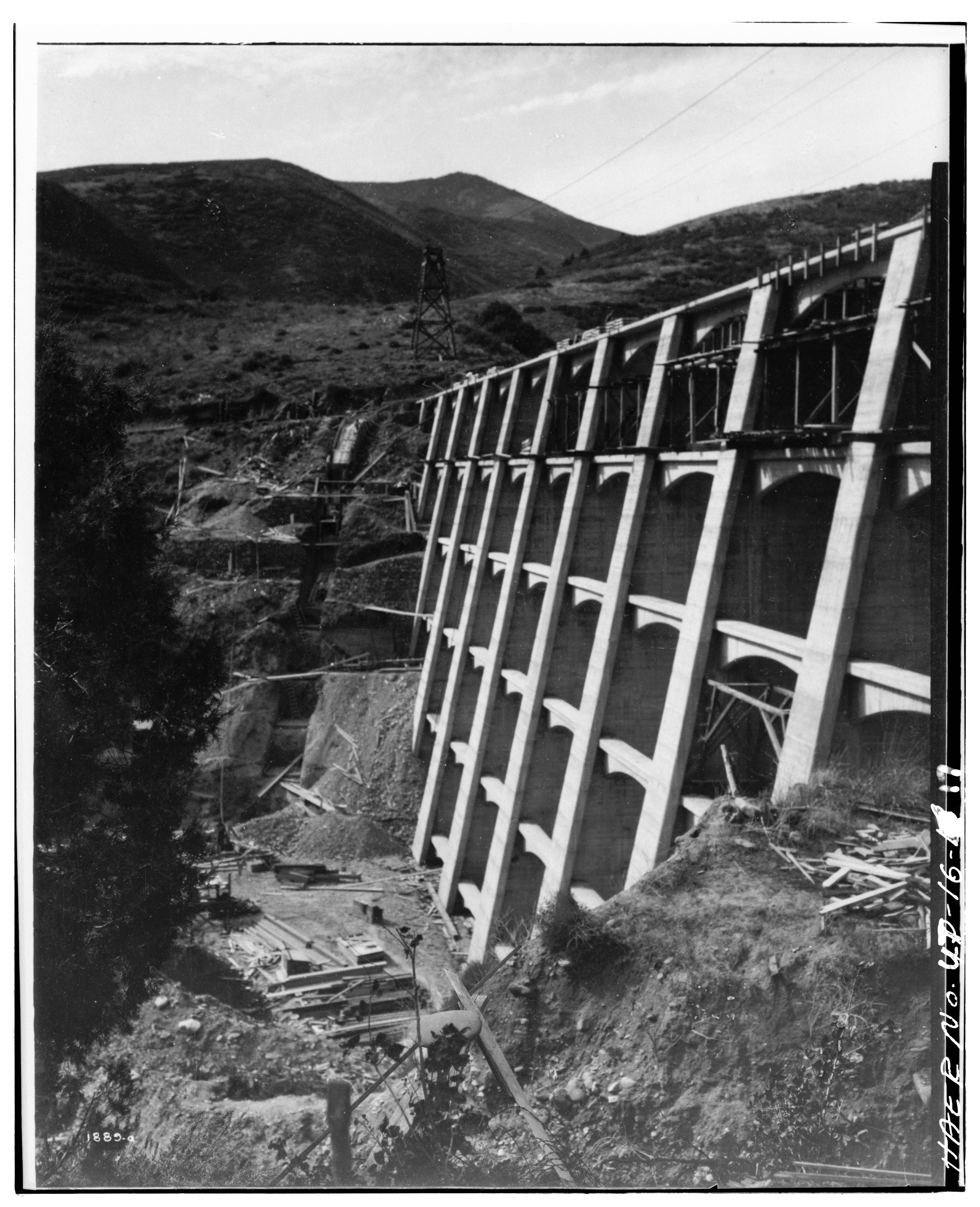
Downstream side of the dam. Circa 1925.

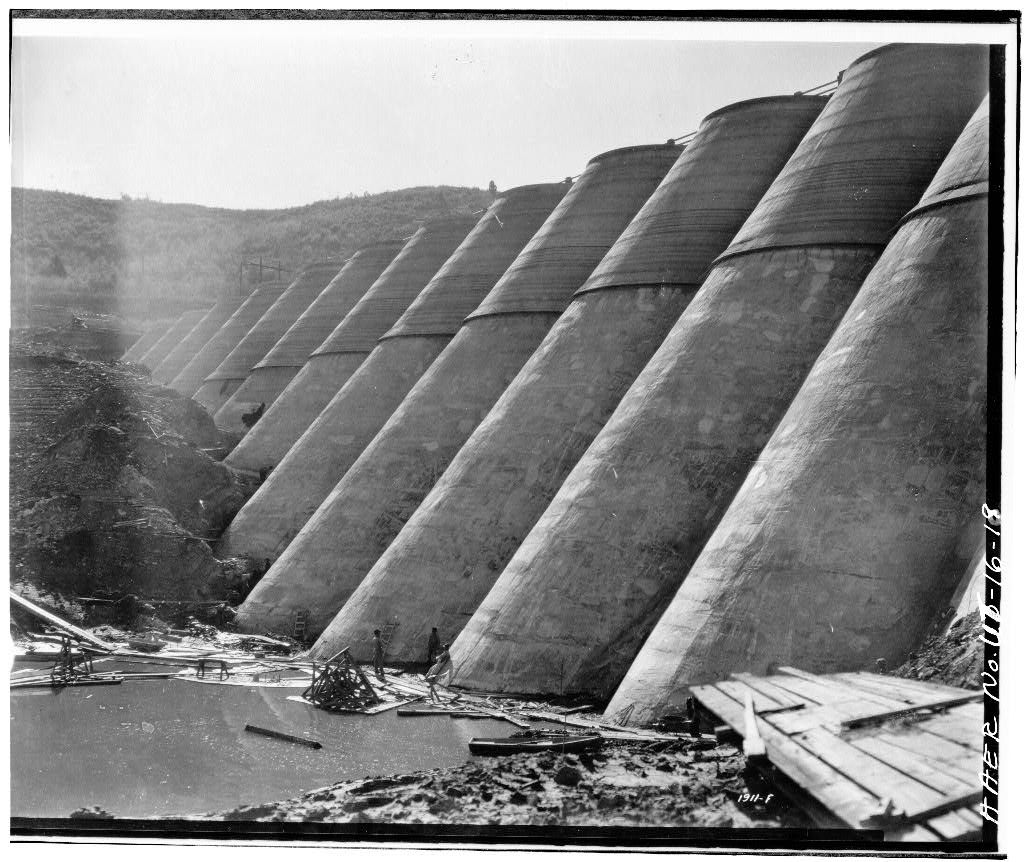
Upstream side of the dam. Circa 1925.

The Mountain Dell Dam provides a water equalizing and storage reservoir for Salt Lake City, Utah located 10 miles (16 km) east of the city in northeastern Salt Lake County, near Interstate 80 in Parley's Canyon.

Designed by John S. Eastwood, and constructed between 1914 and 1925, the dam is an example of a mixed buttress dam and multiple arch dam construction. At the time the plans were made, the city was in need of a sufficient supply of water, especially during late summer and the middle of winter.

With the completion of the dam, the city had an available storage capacity of 850 million US gallons (3,200,000 m^{3}), and distributing or equalizing capacity of 24 million US gallons (91,000 m^{3}) compared to 9 million US gallons (34,000 m^{3}) previously.

The dam was listed on the National Register of Historic Places in 1980.

Mountain Dell Dam is listed as in "poor" condition and is under repair.

== Design ==
Plans were made for three types of dam:

- Arched solid dam, gravity type
- Reinforced concrete dam of the Ambursen type
- Multiple arch reinforced concrete dam of the Eastwood design

After consideration, the multiple arch type was chosen. One of the factors influencing this decision was the bedrock condition at the site. The bedrock is a calcareous shale not entirely watertight and of a nature to decompose somewhat under exposure to air and water. The advantages of the multiple arch type in this connection were considered to be the practical elimination of upward pressure, the practical impossibility of overturning or sliding on its base and the ready facilities for internal inspection of the dam at any time.

== Construction ==
The dam was built in two stages, the first stage completed in 1917 with a height of 105 feet (32 m) above the foundation and the second stage, completed 1925, added 40 feet (12 m) to the height of the dam.

The cost of the structure was considerably increased because of the necessity of going 43 feet (13 m) below ground level in the bottom of the canyon to secure the bedrock foundation. The spillway level is 4 feet (1.2 m) below the top of the dam, so that the maximum depth of the reservoir is 58 feet (18 m) to the crest of the spillway.

The dam as planned and as constructed consists of 11 buttresses and 11 arches in the first stage and an additional 5 buttresses and 5 arches in the second stage. The maximum base width of the dam is 132 feet (40 m) from the face of the arch to the downstream end of the buttresses. The maximum thickness of the buttresses is 8 feet (2.4 m). The maximum thickness of the arch rings is 4.1 feet (1.2 m). The thickness at the present top of the dam is 15 inches (380 mm). The arch rings are 120 degree arcs of circles. The spacing between buttress centers is 35 feet (11 m). The two sets of outlet gates each consist of two 24 inches (610 mm) pipes with a suitable grating entrance, and with a butterfly and a double-disc gate valve on each pipe.

The total quantity of concrete in the dam is 8,271 cubic yards (6,323 m^{3}). The total cost of the dam was $90,000. The storage capacity at the present height is slightly over 300 million US gallons (1,100,000 m^{3}). The general design and supervision was handled under the direction of Sylvester Q. Cannon, City Engineer of Salt Lake City and John S. Eastwood acting as consulting engineer. Parrott Bros. Co. were the contractors.

== Condition ==
As of 2019 Mountain Dell Dam was listed as being in "poor" condition, with increased hazard due to its proximity to highways and parks, with risk to life in the event of failure. A liner is being installed on the upstream face to control water intrusion that creates freeze/thaw damage. Until the deterioration is arrested, the reservoir may only be half full during the winter.

== See also ==
- American Water Landmark – (awarded 1981)
