= Henefer, Utah =

Town in Utah, United States

- Town
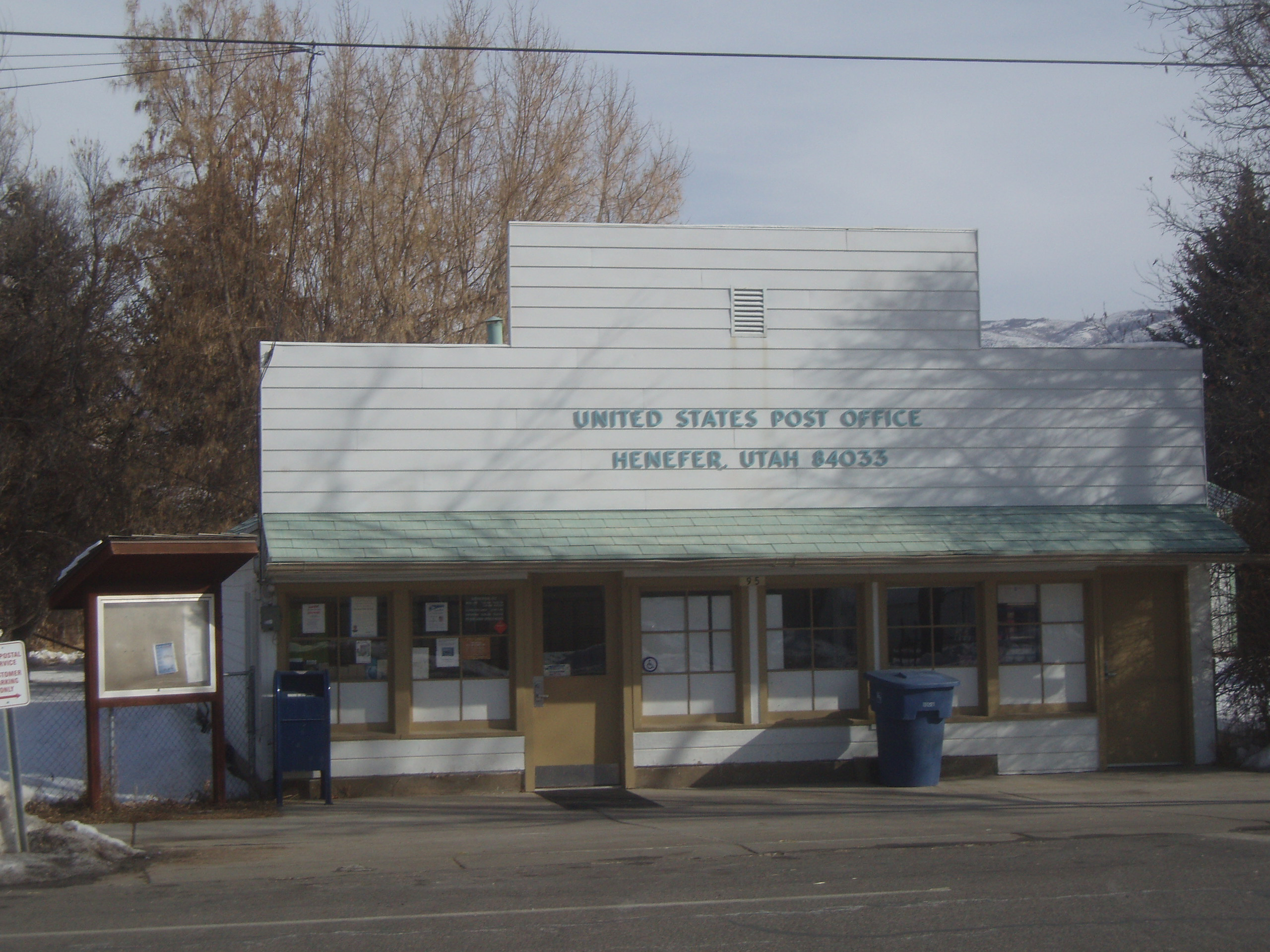
- Henefer Post Office, January 2010

- Location in Summit County and the state of Utah
- Coordinates: 41°00′50″N 111°29′36″W
- Country: United States
- State: Utah
- County: Summit
- Founded: 1853
- Incorporated: 1938
- Named for: James and William Hennefer

Area
  - Total: 2.46 sq mi (6.38 km^{2})
  - Land: 2.46 sq mi (6.38 km^{2})
  - Water: 0 sq mi (0.00 km^{2})
- Elevation: 5,341 ft (1,628 m)

Population (2020)
  - Total: 838
  - Density: 397.5/sq mi (153.48/km^{2})
- Time zone: UTC-7 (Mountain (MST))
  - Summer (DST): UTC-6 (MDT)
- ZIP code: 84033
- Area code: 435
- FIPS code: 49-34640
- GNIS feature ID: 2412745
- Website: www.henefer.gov

Henefer (/ˈhɛnəfər/ HEN-ə-fər) is a town in Summit County, Utah, United States. It is part of the Salt Lake City, Utah Metropolitan Statistical Area. The population was 838 at the 2020 census.

== History ==
Henefer was founded in 1859. The community was named after James and William Hennefer, early citizens.

== Geography ==
According to the United States Census Bureau, the town has a total area of 0.9 square miles (2.3 km^{2}), all land.

The hillside letter H can be seen in the southwest

=== Climate ===
Large seasonal temperature differences typify this climatic region, with warm to hot (and often humid) summers and cold (sometimes severely cold) winters. According to the Köppen Climate Classification system, Henefer has a humid continental climate, abbreviated Dfb on climate maps.

== Demographics ==
Historical population
Census	Pop.	Note	%±
1870	172		—
1880	262		52.3%
1890	291		11.1%
1900	348		19.6%
1910	413		18.7%
1920	405		−1.9%
1930	469		15.8%
1940	413		−11.9%
1950	346		−16.2%
1960	408		17.9%
1970	446		9.3%
1980	547		22.6%
1990	554		1.3%
2000	684		23.5%
2010	766		12.0%
2020	838		9.4%
U.S. Decennial Census

As of the census of 2000, there were 684 people, 219 households, and 178 families residing in the town. The population density was 797.5 people per square mile (307.9/km^{2}). There were 230 housing units at an average density of 268.2 per square mile (103.6/km^{2}). The racial makeup of the town was 97.51% White, 0.15% African American, 0.15% Native American, 0.44% Asian, 1.75% from other races. Hispanic or Latino of any race were 2.63% of the population.

There were 219 households, out of which 45.7% had children under the age of 18 living with them, 72.1% were married couples living together, 7.8% had a female householder with no husband present, and 18.3% were non-families. 17.4% of all households were made up of individuals, and 11.0% had someone living alone who was 65 years of age or older. The average household size was 3.12, and the average family size was 3.53.

In the town, the population was spread out, with 35.1% under 18, 12.1% from 18 to 24, 24.1% from 25 to 44, 18.4% from 45 to 64, and 10.2% who were 65 years of age or older. The median age was 28 years. For every 100 females, there were 103.6 males. For every 100 females aged 18 and over, there were 93.9 males.

The median income for a household in the town was $43,125, and the median income for a family was $46,667. Males had a median income of $40,000 versus $21,071 for females. The per capita income was $14,791. About 4.4% of families and 4.8% of the population were below the poverty line, including 6.6% of those under age 18 and 7.9% of those aged 65 or over.

== Education ==
The town is in the North Summit School District.

== See also ==
- List of cities and towns in Utah
