= Davis County, Utah =

County in Utah, United States

- County
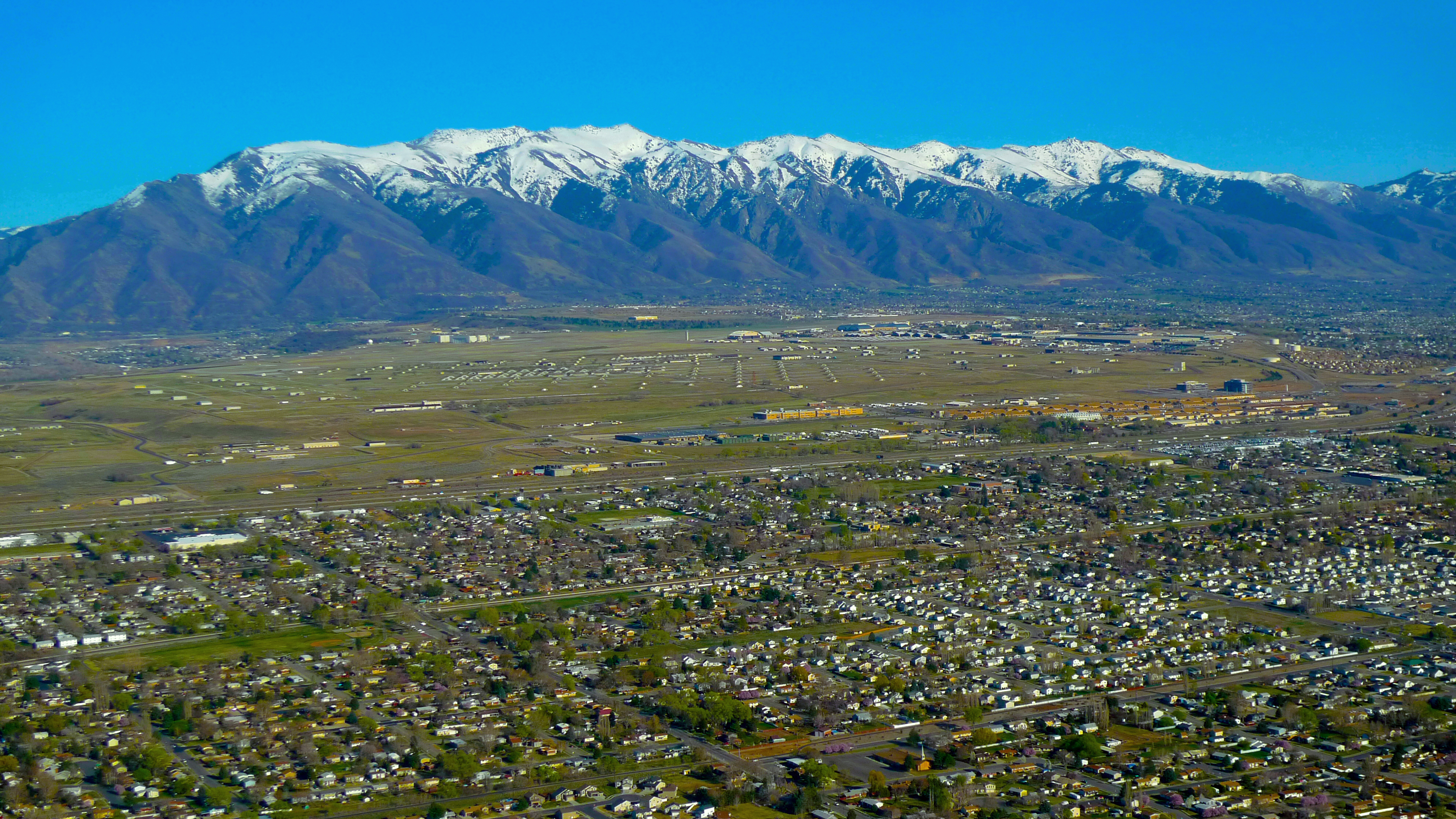
- Davis County, Utah

- Location within the U.S. state of Utah
- Coordinates: 41.01°N 112.12°W
- Country: United States
- State: Utah
- Founded: October 5, 1850
- Named for: Daniel C. Davis
- Seat: Farmington
- Largest city: Layton

Area
  - Total: 634 sq mi (1,640 km^{2})
  - Land: 299 sq mi (770 km^{2})
  - Water: 335 sq mi (870 km^{2}) 53%

Population (2020)
  - Total: 362,679
  - Estimate (2025): 381,227 ▲
  - Density: 1,248/sq mi (482/km^{2})
- Time zone: UTC−7 (Mountain)
  - Summer (DST): UTC−6 (MDT)
- Congressional districts: 1st, 2nd
- Website: www.daviscountyutah.gov

Davis County is a county in northern Utah, United States. As of the 2020 United States census, the population was 362,679, making it Utah's third-most populous county. Its county seat is Farmington, and its largest city by both population and area is Layton.

Davis County is part of the Ogden-Clearfield, UT Metropolitan Statistical Area as well as the Salt Lake City-Provo-Orem, UT Combined Statistical Area.

== History ==
The legislature of the provisional State of Deseret defined the county in an October 5, 1850, act, which also designated Farmington as the seat due to its location midway between boundaries at the Weber River on the north and the Jordan River on the south. It was named for Daniel C. Davis, a captain in the Mormon Battalion. The county boundaries were altered in 1852, 1854, 1855, and 1862. In 1880, the county gained part of the islands and waters of Great Salt Lake that had previously been attached to Salt Lake County. The county boundary has remained unchanged since that time.

During its first 50 years, Davis County grew slowly. With the advent of the Utah Central Rail Road in 1870, a transition to mechanized agriculture and a surge of commerce, banking, improved roads, new water systems, and electrification of homes began. However, by 1940, the population was barely 16,000.

With the establishment of Hill Air Force Base in northern Davis County and southern Weber County, there was a surge in civilian employment after World War II. The county doubled in population between 1940 and 1950 and doubled again between 1950 and 1960 as part of the nationwide suburb boom that was occurring at the time. By 1990, there were 188,000 residents, and in 2000, there were 239,000. As of 2020, the county population is above 360,000.

== Geography ==
Davis County has an area of 634 square miles (1,640 km^{2}), of which 299 square miles (770 km^{2}) is land and 335 square miles (870 km^{2}) (53%) is water. It is Utah's smallest county by land area and second smallest by total area.

The county lies generally between the Great Salt Lake on the west and the Wasatch Range on the east, which rises to a height of 9,707 feet (2,959 m) in the county at Thurston Peak.

The Great Salt Lake is surrounded by marshland and mudflats and lies at an average elevation of approximately 4,200 feet (1,300 m), varying depending on the water level, which can lead to drastic changes in the lake's size due to its shallowness. Davis County includes Antelope Island, the lake's largest island. The entire island is a state park, designated to protect natural scenery and especially wildlife on the island, which includes bighorn sheep, pronghorn, and a bison herd.

The inhabited portion of Davis County between the lake and the mountain range is called the Wasatch Front, a narrow stretch of land that restricts north–south transportation in the county.

=== Adjacent counties ===
- Weber County - north
- Morgan County - east
- Salt Lake County - south
- Tooele County - west
- Box Elder County - northwest

=== Protected areas ===
- Antelope Island State Park
- Crystal West Unit Farmington Bay (part)
- Farmington Bay Waterfowl Management Area
- Howard Slough Waterfowl Management Area
- Wasatch-Cache National Forest (part)

=== Lakes ===
- Adams Reservoir
- Farmington Bay
- Hobbs Reservoir
- Holmes Reservoir

== Climate ==
Eastern parts of Davis County experience a humid continental climate (Dsa), while western parts may experience a mediterranean climate (Csa). Summers are dry and hot, and winters are cold and wet, but rarely frigid. Snow is frequent during winter, with up to 90 in (230 cm) annually on high bench areas in the east and at least 60 inches (150 cm) on the valley floor. Annual precipitation averages between 18 and 25 inches (460 and 640 mm) in the county, with spring being the wettest season and summer the driest. Summers are hot, with several days each year averaging above 95 °F (35 °C). However, the humidity is low, making for comparatively comfortable temperatures. In winter, temperatures sometimes drop below 0 °F (−18 °C), but rarely for extended periods of time. Compared to Salt Lake County to the south, the weather in Davis County is extreme. Lake-effect snows hit the southern portion of the county harder, and even in non-lake-effect storms, the lack of a rain shadow in Davis County (much of Salt Lake County lies in the rain shadow of the Oquirrh Mountains) means that storms often hit Davis County harder. In addition, canyon winds from the east can sometimes cause devastating wind damage, and wind gusts above 100 mph (160 km/h) have been reported. This frequently occurrence happens when a powerful high-pressure system is over Wyoming. Extreme wind events, however, seem to have declined in frequency in recent years.

== Demographics ==
Historical population
Census	Pop.	Note	%±
1850	1,134		—
1860	2,904		156.1%
1870	4,459		53.5%
1880	5,279		18.4%
1890	6,751		27.9%
1900	7,996		18.4%
1910	10,191		27.5%
1920	11,450		12.4%
1930	14,021		22.5%
1940	15,784		12.6%
1950	30,867		95.6%
1960	64,760		109.8%
1970	99,028		52.9%
1980	146,540		48.0%
1990	187,941		28.3%
2000	238,994		27.2%
2010	306,479		28.2%
2020	362,679		18.3%
2025 (est.)	381,227		5.1%
US Decennial Census; 1790–1960 1900–1990; 1990–2000 2010 2020

=== 2020 census ===
According to the 2020 United States census and 2020 American Community Survey, there were 362,679 people in Davis County with a population density of 1,116.9 people per square mile (431.2/km^{2}). Among non-Hispanic or Latino people, the racial makeup was 292,458 (80.6%) White, 4,008 (1.1%) African American, 1,464 (0.4%) Native American, 6,907 (1.9%) Asian, 3,204 (0.9%) Pacific Islander, 1,244 (0.3%) from other races, and 14,099 (3.9%) from two or more races. 39,295 (10.8%) people were Hispanic or Latino.

Davis County, Utah – Racial and ethnic composition Note: the US Census treats Hispanic/Latino as an ethnic category. This table excludes Latinos from the racial categories and assigns them to a separate category. Hispanics/Latinos may be of any race.
Race / Ethnicity (NH = Non-Hispanic)	Pop 2000	Pop 2010	Pop 2020	% 2000	% 2010	% 2020
White alone (NH)	214,636	263,049	292,458	89.81%	85.83%	80.64%
Black or African American alone (NH)	2,521	3,435	4,008	1.05%	1.12%	1.11%
Native American or Alaska Native alone (NH)	1,174	1,090	1,464	0.49%	0.36%	0.40%
Asian alone (NH)	3,568	5,245	6,907	1.49%	1.71%	1.90%
Pacific Islander alone (NH)	609	1,753	3,204	0.25%	0.57%	0.88%
Other race alone (NH)	204	340	1,244	0.09%	0.11%	0.34%
Mixed race or Multiracial (NH)	3,327	5,814	14,099	1.39%	1.90%	3.89%
Hispanic or Latino (any race)	12,955	25,753	39,295	5.42%	8.40%	10.83%
Total	238,994	306,479	362,679	100.00%	100.00%	100.00%

There were 182,251 (50.25%) males and 180,428 (49.75%) females, and the population distribution by age was 116,295 (32.1%) under the age of 18, 207,510 (57.2%) from 18 to 64, and 38,874 (10.7%) who were at least 65 years old. The median age was 31.4 years.

There were 111,552 households in Davis County with an average size of 3.25, of which 88,909 (79.7%) were families and 22,643 (20.3%) were non-families. Among all families, 72,995 (65.4%) were married couples, 5,369 (4.8%) were male householders with no spouse, and 10,545 (9.5%) were female householders with no spouse. Among all non-families, 18,004 (16.1%) were a single person living alone, and 4,639 (4.2%) were two or more people living together. 50,193 (45.0%) of all households had children under the age of 18. 84,985 (76.2%) of households were owner-occupied while 26,567 (23.8%) were renter-occupied.

The median income for a Davis County household was $87,570, and the median family income was $96,482, with a per-capita income of $32,819. The median income for males who were full-time employees was $63,558 and for females $42,136. 5.3% of the population and 4.2% of families were below the poverty line.

In terms of education attainment, out of the 205,899 people in Davis County 25 years or older, 8,458 (4.1%) had not completed high school, 43,575 (21.2%) had a high school diploma or equivalency, 75,283 (36.6%) had some college or associate degree, 53,067 (25.8%) had a bachelor's degree, and 25,516 (12.4%) had a graduate or professional degree.

=== 2010 census ===
As of the 2010 United States census, there were 306,479 people, 93,545 households, and 76,205 families in the county. The population density was 1,025 people per square mile (396 people/km^{2}). There were 97,570 housing units at an average density of 320.95 units per square mile (123.92 units/km^{2}). The racial makeup of the county was 90.04% White, 1.21% Black or African American, 0.46% Native American, 1.77% Asian, 0.59% Pacific Islander, 3.24% from other races, and 2.69% from two or more races. 8.42% of the population were Hispanic or Latino of any race.

There were 93,545 households, out of which 45.1% had children under the age of 18 living with them, 67.99% were married couples living together, 9.59% had a female householder with no husband present, and 18.54% were non-families. 15.23% of all households were made up of individuals, and 5.27% had someone living alone who was 65 years of age or older. The average household size was 3.24, and the average family size was 3.63.

The county population contained 37.23% under the age of 20, 6.56% from 20 to 24, 28.13% from 25 to 44, 19.92% from 45 to 64, and 8.15% who were 65 years of age or older. The median age was 29.2 years. For every 100 females, there were 100.85 males. For every 100 females age 18 and over, there were 97.09 males.

== Law and government ==
A three-member board of commissioners is the county's governing body. The commissioners are elected to staggered four-year terms. They are responsible for all county services and operations. They approve, adopt, and amend the budget; they also serve as the legislative body and regulate business licensing in the county's unincorporated areas. The county commissioners (as of 2021) are:

- Bob J. Stevenson, chair (term ends January 5, 2027)
- Randy B. Elliott, vice chair (term ends January 6, 2025)
- Lorene Miner Kamalu (term ends January 5, 2027)

Other elected offices include the County Attorney, Assessor, Clerk/Auditor, Sheriff, Recorder, Surveyor, and Treasurer.

- The assessor is responsible for the valuation of all real property in the county. The current assessor is Dale Peterson (as of March 2018).
- The clerk/auditor serves as the county's chief financial and budget officer. The current Clerk/Auditor is Curtis Koch (as of March 2018).
- The treasurer is responsible for the collection and investment of county funds. The current Treasurer is Mark Altom (as of March 2019).

Davis County voters are traditionally Republican. In no national election since 1948 has the county selected the Democratic Party candidate (as of 2024).

State Elected Offices
Position	District	Name	Affiliation	First Elected
Senate	18	F. Ann Millner	Republican	2014
Senate	20	D. Gregg Buxton	Republican	2016
Senate	21	Jerry Stevenson	Republican	2010
Senate	22	J. Stuart Adams	Republican	2009
Senate	23	Todd Weiler	Republican	2012
House of Representatives	11	Kelly Miles	Republican	2016
House of Representatives	12	Mike Schultz	Republican	2014
House of Representatives	13	Karen Peterson	Republican	2022
House of Representatives	14	Karianne Lisonbee	Republican	2016
House of Representatives	15	Brad Wilson	Republican	2010
House of Representatives	16	Stephen Handy	Republican	2010
House of Representatives	17	Stewart Barlow	Republican	2011
House of Representatives	18	Timothy Hawkes	Republican	2014
House of Representatives	19	Raymond Ward	Republican	2014
House of Representatives	20	Melissa Garff Ballard	Republican	2018
Board of Education	4	Brent Strate	Republican	2020
Board of Education	5	Laura Belnap	Nonpartisan	2014

United States presidential election results for Davis County, Utah
Year	Republican		Democratic		Third party(ies)	
Year	No.	%	No.	%	No.	%
1896	450	20.43%	1,753	79.57%	0	0.00%
1900	1,238	47.02%	1,380	52.41%	15	0.57%
1904	1,657	56.19%	1,255	42.56%	37	1.25%
1908	1,736	55.89%	1,331	42.85%	39	1.26%
1912	1,295	44.36%	1,142	39.12%	482	16.51%
1916	1,641	43.18%	2,131	56.08%	28	0.74%
1920	2,463	59.75%	1,632	39.59%	27	0.66%
1924	2,265	55.51%	1,507	36.94%	308	7.55%
1928	2,508	52.05%	2,296	47.65%	14	0.29%
1932	2,562	45.60%	3,006	53.51%	50	0.89%
1936	1,841	31.84%	3,920	67.80%	21	0.36%
1940	2,836	42.28%	3,865	57.63%	6	0.09%
1944	3,663	41.39%	5,179	58.51%	9	0.10%
1948	4,718	43.14%	6,147	56.21%	71	0.65%
1952	9,067	60.34%	5,960	39.66%	0	0.00%
1956	12,122	66.71%	6,050	33.29%	0	0.00%
1960	13,782	57.34%	10,244	42.62%	8	0.03%
1964	14,477	50.52%	14,177	49.48%	0	0.00%
1968	20,658	60.60%	10,624	31.17%	2,805	8.23%
1972	29,706	72.61%	7,954	19.44%	3,251	7.95%
1976	31,216	66.28%	14,084	29.90%	1,797	3.82%
1980	45,695	78.98%	9,065	15.67%	3,099	5.36%
1984	49,863	80.29%	11,727	18.88%	512	0.82%
1988	50,469	73.80%	16,868	24.67%	1,047	1.53%
1992	39,087	48.05%	14,924	18.35%	27,339	33.61%
1996	42,768	60.25%	19,301	27.19%	8,912	12.56%
2000	64,375	73.27%	18,845	21.45%	4,635	5.28%
2004	86,187	78.88%	20,893	19.12%	2,188	2.00%
2008	77,341	69.74%	30,477	27.48%	3,084	2.78%
2012	96,861	80.00%	21,889	18.08%	2,319	1.92%
2016	62,219	44.35%	28,776	20.51%	49,293	35.14%
2020	104,135	61.29%	57,411	33.79%	8,349	4.91%
2024	101,293	60.81%	59,895	35.96%	5,382	3.23%

== Economy ==
Davis County is often characterized as a bedroom community. According to the Census Bureau's 2004 American Community Survey, 42.3% of the population works in another county. South Davis County commuters who work in Salt Lake County frequently encounter commuting time traffic bottlenecks between Davis and Salt Lake Counties. The Legacy Parkway and the FrontRunner commuter rail project were built to alleviate this problem.

The commuter rail stations in the county have spurred plans for extensive transit-oriented development (TOD), including the Station Park development in Farmington. Farmington is also the home of the Lagoon Amusement Park, the primary amusement park on the Wasatch Front.

Davis County's largest employer is Hill Air Force Base. Earnings of civilians at Hill AFB are almost double the state average. Hill AFB accounts for about 12% of the economy of Davis County and about 2.6% of the economy of Utah. Hill AFB provides employment for nearly 23,000 military and civilian personnel (approximately 4,500 active duty, 1,200 reservists, 13,000 federal civil servants, and 4,000 civilian contractors). Other large employers include Davis School District, Lagoon Amusement Park, and Lifetime Products.

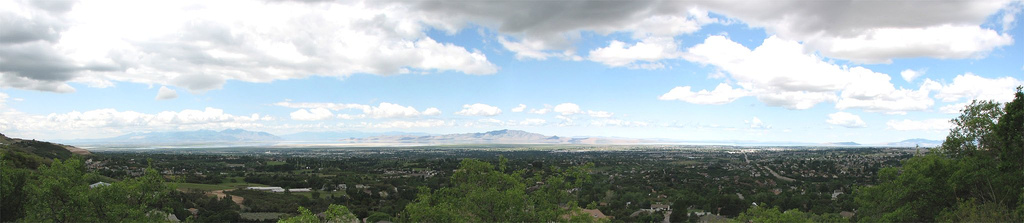
Panorama of Davis County from Fernwood Park in Layton

== Education ==
Public education in Davis County is provided by the Davis School District. There are currently 59 elementary schools, 16 junior high schools, 9 high schools, and 3 alternative schools in the school district. The high schools are as follows, showing where they are located:

- Bountiful High School - Bountiful
- Clearfield High School - Clearfield
- Davis High School - Kaysville
- Layton High School - Layton
- Northridge High School - Layton
- Syracuse High School - Syracuse
- Farmington High School - Farmington
- Viewmont High School - Bountiful
- Woods Cross High School - Woods Cross

The campus of Davis Technical College is in Kaysville.

Utah State University owns and operates the Utah Botanical Center in Kaysville, which includes an education center. Weber State University also operates campuses in Layton and Farmington.

== Transportation ==
The most important road in the county is Interstate 15, which runs north–south through the center of the county. US-89 enters parallel to I-15 from Salt Lake County to the south and runs north through North Salt Lake and Bountiful as a city road before merging with I-15. It re-emerges in Farmington near the Lagoon Amusement Park, heading along the eastern benches on the slopes of the Wasatch Range, entering Weber County near South Weber. The Utah Department of Transportation is currently (2019) upgrading US-89 to a freeway through eastern Layton north to its interchange with I-84 near the Weber County border. Congestion is a significant problem in the county, as east–west transportation is restricted by the narrow urban corridor and many of its citizens commute south to Salt Lake County.

To relieve congestion in the county, the Legacy Parkway began construction in 2006. Construction began near the US-89/I-15 interchange in Farmington in 2004, but was soon halted due to a lawsuit filed by environmentalists, who were concerned that the road would harm marshlands along the eastern edge of the Great Salt Lake. They requested an independent evaluation for completeness of the environmental impact statement. A settlement was reached in 2005, and the final injunction was lifted in 2006. The Legacy Parkway opened in 2008, running from the US-89/I-15 interchange in Farmington southward to connect with I-215 near the border with Salt Lake County. An extensive trail system, wetland protection measures, and landscaping were implemented along the highway in response to the environmental concerns, in addition to a lower speed limit and a ban of semi-trailer trucks on the highway. However, this compromise will expire in 2020, and the roadway is expected to begin functioning under normal Interstate System regulations (i.e., trucks and higher speed limits allowed).

In 2008, the Utah Transit Authority opened the FrontRunner commuter rail line from Salt Lake City north to Ogden, serving the length of Davis County with stations in Woods Cross, Farmington, Layton, and Clearfield.

=== Major highways ===
- Interstate 15
- Interstate 84
- Interstate 215
- U.S. Route 89
- State Route 67 - Legacy Parkway
- State Route 68 - Redwood Road
- State Route 177 - West Davis Corridor
- State Route 193 - Bernard Fisher Highway

== Communities ==
Map of Davis County cities

=== Cities ===
- Bountiful
- Centerville
- Clearfield
- Clinton
- Farmington
- Fruit Heights
- Kaysville
- Layton
- North Salt Lake
- South Weber
- Sunset
- Syracuse
- West Bountiful
- West Point
- Woods Cross

=== Townships ===
- Mutton Hollow

== See also ==
- List of counties in Utah
- National Register of Historic Places in Davis County, Utah
