= Don Eck =

American football player and coach (born 1961)

Biographical details
- Born: November 30, 1961 (age 64); Norwalk, California, U.S.

Playing career
- 1980–1982: Utah
- Position: Center

Coaching career (HC unless noted)
- 1983: Utah (SA)
- 1984: Woods Cross HS (UT) (assistant)
- 1985–1986: Utah (GA)
- 1987–1989: Utah (OL)
- 1990: Arizona (GA)
- 1991: James Madison (OL)
- 1992–1993: James Madison (AH/OL)
- 1994–2002: Utah (OL)
- 2003: Scottish Claymores (OL)
- 2004–2006: Berlin Thunder (OC/OL)
- 2007: Rhein Fire (OC/OL)
- 2008: Weber State (OL)
- 2009–2012: Las Vegas Locomotives (OL)
- 2013–2016: Corner Canyon HS (UT)
- 2020–2021: Clearfield HS (UT) (OC)

Accomplishments and honors

Championships
- 2 UFL (2009, 2010)

Donald Eck (born November 30, 1961) is an American former football coach. Until November 2021, he was the offensive coordinator at Clearfield High School in Clearfield, Utah, a position he held since the summer of 2020. Eck previously spent 28 years as an assistant coach at the collegiate and professional levels, including stints as offensive coordinator of the Berlin Thunder and Rhein Fire in NFL Europe. Eck was the original head coach at Corner Canyon High School in Draper, Utah.

== Playing career ==
Eck played as center for Utah from 1980 to 1982. He was voted Utah's Most Valuable Lineman all three years. He made the all-Western Athletic Conference (WAC) second team in both 1981 and 1982. Eck was team captain as a senior in 1982.

== Coaching career ==
Eck began his coaching career as student assistant at Utah in 1983. After a one-year stint as assistant coach at Woods Cross High School (Utah) he returned to his alma mater in 1985, where he served two seasons as a graduate assistant before becoming the offensive line coach (1987–1989).

In 1990, Eck coached the centers and guards for Arizona’s Aloha Bowl team. From there, he went to James Madison as offensive line coach. The Dukes’ 1991 team finished 12th in the nation in total offense. He was promoted to assistant head coach/offensive line coach prior to the 1992 season.

Eck's third coaching stint in Salt Lake City began in 1994, when he was added to Ron McBride’s Utah staff as offensive line coach.

After leaving Utah, Eck spent five seasons in NFL Europe. He was the offensive line coach for the Scottish Claymores (2003) and served as offensive coordinator and offensive line coach for the Berlin Thunder (2004–2006) and Rhein Fire (2007).

Eck returned to college football in 2008 as the offensive line coach at Weber State. In January 2009, he was promoted to assistant head coach and offensive coordinator, but left WSU at the beginning of spring workouts to join the Las Vegas franchise of the United Football League.

In the summer of 2020, Eck took the job as the offensive coordinator at Clearfield High School in Clearfield, Utah, coaching under former NFL player and Clearfield alumnus Andre Dyson. Eck was fired from this position on November 23, 2021, for leaving a harassing voicemail on a student's phone, which included, in part, "Hey, give me a call when you can. I want to meet with your parents, man, ’cause I keep hearing your mom's putting all sorts of (expletive) on social media talking (expletive) about the coaches here and I'm gonna put a stop to that, bro."
