= Davis School District =

School district in Utah, United States

Address
- 45 East State Street; PO Box 588 Farmington, Utah, 84025; United States

District information
- Type: Public
- Motto: Learning First!
- Grades: PK - 12
- Established: 1911
- Superintendent: Dan Linford
- Governing agency: Utah Department of Education
- Schools: 59 elementary schools; 17 junior high schools; 8 high schools; 4 special schools
- NCES District ID: 4900210

Students and staff
- Students: 72,987
- Teachers: 2,769

Other information
- Website: www.davis.k12.ut.us

Davis School District is a school district serving Davis County, Utah, United States. Headquartered in the county seat of Farmington, it is the 61st largest school district in the United States and the 2nd largest school district in Utah with 72,987 students attending Davis schools as of 2019. It is located almost entirely within Davis County. Students attend elementary school from kindergarten to 6th grade, junior high from 7th grade-9th grade, and high school from 10th grade-12th grade.

== History ==
The school district was founded in 1911 with 2,730 students attending 31 neighborhood schools across Davis County. The inaugural school board member and president was future Utah governor Henry Blood.

In 2006, the Davis School District received recognition for having the nation's top graduation rate among the 100 largest school districts in the United States, according to a survey by the Manhattan Institute for Policy Research. Also in 2006, the superintendent, Dr. W. Bryan Bowles was awarded superintendent of the year in Utah. (Note: Until 2016, Dr. W. Bryan Bowles was the superintendent of Davis School District. However, effective 31 August, he retired and a replacement had yet to be named.)

For the 2016–17 school year, Reid Newey moved from the Weber School District to become the superintendent of DSD. As of 2026, the current superintendent is Dan Linford.

== Controversies and Lawsuits ==
=== ACLU Lawsuit (2012) ===
In 2012, district administrators were sued by the American Civil Liberties Union for deciding to remove the book In Our Mothers’ House by children's author Patricia Polacco from the shelves of their elementary school libraries due to its content about lesbian mothers. The district returned the book to shelves a few months later.

=== Bus driver lawsuit, DoJ investigation (2019) ===
In 2019, a Davis school bus driver closed the bus doors on the backpack of a boy, pinning him outside the bus and dragging him forward over 150 feet. His family sued the driver, alleging this was done intentionally to racially harass the boy, who was biracial. They pointed to alleged previous instances of racial harassment by the driver and attempts at retaliation for reporting him. The district settled the suit in 2021 for $62,500 and acknowledged the racial assault. The incident also sparked a three-year investigation into the Davis School District by the United States Department of Justice (DOJ). That investigation found that racial harassment was widespread in the school district and hundreds of complaints were intentionally unaddressed. Black and Asian students in the district faced a hostile environment where they were subjected to racial slurs, and Davis School District employees responded to complaints by telling them "not to be so sensitive or [making] excuses for harassing students by explaining that they were 'not trying to be racist'". The DOJ required the district to create a plan to address the systemic problems moving forward which included changing its policies, offering more training, and creating a department for racial discrimination complaints with a director which is approved by the federal government.

=== DoJ Settlement (2021-2025) ===
In October of 2021 after a three-year investigation, the Department of Justice publicly determined the Davis School District "had failed to respond appropriately to known harassment of Black and Asian-American students, including frequent racial slurs and epithets, threats of violence, and physical assault by staff and students." They used Title IV of the Civil Rights Act of 1964 to make the District enter into a settlement to resolve these issues. Title VI of the Civil Rights Act prohibits discrimination of any protected class in any institutions which receive federal funding (like the Davis School District).

=== Suicide and bullying lawsuit (2021) ===
In 2021, a ten-year-old black girl who attended the District's Foxboro Elementary School died by suicide attributed to racist bullying. An independent investigation commissioned by the district found some staff had joined in the mistreatment of the girl. In 2023, her family was awarded $2 million in a civil rights settlement, to be paid by Davis School District.

=== Book removals (2022) ===
In 2023, the district removed the Bible from its elementary and middle schools while keeping it in high schools after a committee reviewed the scripture in response to a parental complaint. The complaints against the Bible were filed by a parent who objected to what they said was a “bad faith” policy which earlier led the district ro remove removed other titles, including Sherman Alexie’s The Absolutely True Diary of a Part-Time Indian and John Green’s Looking for Alaska. These removals followed a 2022 state law requiring districts to include parents in decisions over what constitutes "sensitive material" which might be inappropriate for minors. The removal was lifted a few weeks later.

=== Racial discrimination lawsuit (2024) ===
In 2022, Joscelin Thomas was hired by Davis School District per the 2021 DOJ agreement to investigate instances of alleged racial harassment which were reported but not acted on by the District. In January 2024, she claimed several instances of racial discrimination including wrongful termination. Later that year, the District and Thomas settled out of court for $143,558 later that year. Thomas was unable to comment on therms of the settlement, and the district admitted no wrongdoing. Over $57,000 of the settlement went to her law firm.

=== Soccer players lawsuit (2026) ===
In January 2026, six former members of the Davis High Girls' Soccer team sued the District over its mishandling of grooming and sexual harassment complaints regarding their head coach. During his tenure at Davis High, head coach Soulivanh "Souli" Phongsavath faced accusations of grooming, misconduct and sexual harassment from multiple former and current players. The soccer players also alleged mishandling of these complaints led to additional harassment by students and staff.

In addition to the coach’s alleged conduct, the players also claimed the district and superintendent Dan Lincord failed to take their claims seriously and properly investigate.

== Communities ==
Davis School District, which has the same boundaries as that of Davis County, serves the following communities:

- Bountiful
- Centerville
- Clearfield
- Clinton
- Farmington
- Fruit Heights
- Hill Air Force Base (most of the land area)
- Kaysville
- Layton
- North Salt Lake
- South Weber
- Sunset
- Syracuse
- West Bountiful
- West Point
- Woods Cross

== Schools ==
The following schools are part of Davis School District:

=== Elementary schools (Note: As of 2016, Fruit Heights was the only city within Davis County which does not have an elementary school located within the city. (All the communities within Davis County, except Hill Air Force Base are classified as cities.)) ===
- Adams Elementary - Layton
- Adelaide Elementary - Bountiful
- Antelope Elementary - Clearfield
- Bluff Ridge Elementary - Syracuse
- Boulton Elementary - Bountiful
- Bountiful Elementary - Bountiful
- Buffalo Point Elementary - Syracuse
- H.C. Burton Elementary - Kaysville
- Canyon Creek Elementary - Farmington
- Centerville Elementary - Centerville
- Clinton Elementary - Clinton
- Columbia Elementary - Kaysville
- Cook Elementary - Syracuse
- Creekside Elementary - Kaysville
- Crestview Elementary - Layton
- Doxey Elementary - Sunset
- Eagle Bay Elementary - Farmington
- East Layton Elementary - Layton
- Ellison Park Elementary - Layton
- Endeavour Elementary - Kaysville
- Farmington Elementary - Farmington
- Foxboro Elementary - North Salt Lake
- Heritage Elementary - Layton
- Hill Field Elementary - Clearfield
- Holbrook Elementary - Bountiful
- Holt Elementary - Clearfield
- Island View Elementary - West Point
- Kay's Creek Elementary - Kaysville
- Kaysville Elementary - Kaysville
- King Elementary - Layton
- Knowlton Elementary - Farmington
- Lakeside Elementary - West Point
- Layton Elementary - Layton
- Lincoln Elementary - Layton
- Meadowbrook Elementary - Bountiful
- Morgan Elementary - Kaysville
- Mountain View Elementary - Layton
- Muir Elementary - Bountiful
- Oak Hills Elementary - Bountiful
- Odyssey Elementary - Woods Cross
- Orchard Elementary - North Salt Lake
- Parkside Elementary - Clinton
- Reading Elementary - Centerville
- Sand Springs Elementary - Layton
- Snow Horse Elementary - Kaysville
- South Clearfield Elementary - Clearfield
- South Weber Elementary - South Weber
- Stewart Elementary - Centerville
- Still Elementary - West Syracuse, Utah
- Sunburst Elementary - Latyon
- Sunset Elementary - Sunset
- Syracuse Elementary - Syracuse
- Taylor Elementary - Centerville
- Tolman Elementary - Bountiful
- Vae View Elementary - Layton
- Valley View Elementary - Bountiful
- Wasatch Elementary - Clearfield
- West Bountiful Elementary - West Bountiful
- West Clinton Elementary - Clinton
- West Point Elementary - West Point
- Whitesides Elementary - Layton
- Windridge Elementary - Kaysville
- Woods Cross Elementary - Woods Cross

=== Junior high schools ===
- Bountiful Junior High School - Bountiful
- Centennial Junior High School - Kaysville
- Centerville Junior High School - Centerville
- Central Davis Junior High School - Layton
- Fairfield Junior High School - Kaysville
- Farmington Junior High School - Farmington
- Horizon Junior High - West Point
- Kaysville Junior High School - Kaysville
- Legacy Junior High School - Layton
- Millcreek Junior High School - Bountiful
- Mueller Park Junior High School - Bountiful
- North Davis Junior High School - Clearfield
- North Layton Junior High School - Layton
- South Davis Junior High School - Bountiful
- Sunset Junior High School - Sunset
- Syracuse Junior High School - Syracuse
- Shoreline Junior High School - Layton
- West Point Junior High School - West Point

=== High schools ===
- Bountiful High School - Bountiful
- Clearfield High School - Clearfield
- Davis Connect 7-12 - Layton
- Davis High School - Kaysville
- Farmington High School - Farmington
- Layton High School - Layton
- Northridge High School - Layton
- Syracuse High School - Syracuse
- Viewmont High School - Bountiful
- Woods Cross High School - Woods Cross

=== Special schools ===
- Family Enrichment Center - Kaysville
- Mountain High School - Kaysville
- Pioneer Adult Rehabilitation Center - Clearfield
- Renaissance Academy - Kaysville
- Vista education campus - Farmington

== See also ==
- List of the largest school districts in the United States by enrollment
- List of school districts in Utah
