= Syracuse High School (Syracuse, Utah) =

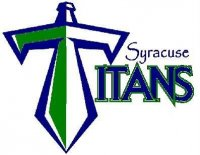

Location
- 665 South 2000 West; Syracuse, Utah 84075; United States; 41°06′16″N 112°03′46″W

Information
- Type: Public high school
- Motto: Ignite the Nation
- Principal: Jed Johansen
- Staff: 99.23 (FTE)
- Grades: 10 through 12
- Enrollment: 2,566 (2023–2024)
- Student to teacher ratio: 25.86
- Colors: Navy blue Forest green White
- Mascot: Titan
- Yearbook: Mnemosyne
- Website: shs.davis.k12.ut.us/o/syhs

Syracuse High School (also called Syracuse High or SHS) is a public high school in Syracuse, Utah, United States. It is part of the Davis School District.

Syracuse High School offers many Advanced Placement, concurrent enrollment and honors courses.

== History ==
In its first operating year, Syracuse High's student body consisted of only the sophomore and junior classes, with no senior class. The total enrolled number of students was approximately 1,100 for the first year, increasing to about 1,600 students in the second year.

== Culture ==
=== Yearbook ===
The school's yearbook is named Mnemosyne, the name of the Titan of memory.

=== Rivalries ===
Syracuse High has had a long-standing rivalry with Clearfield High School. This rivalry was a result of the first graduating classes having students who attended Clearfield High before Syracuse High opened. Other competitive athletic rivalries have formed with other Utah high school teams Davis High School and Farmington High School.

== Athletics ==
=== Overview ===
Syracuse High offers a variety of athletic programs, including football, boys' and girls' basketball, boys' and girls' soccer, baseball, softball, cross country running, Track and field, golf, boys' and girls' tennis, boys' and girls' volleyball, boys' and girls' lacrosse, boys' and girls' wrestling, swimming, dance line, cheerleading.

The school also participates in Unified Sports, an inclusive program partnering students with and without intellectual disabilities, offering unified teams in soccer, basketball, and track.

=== Achievements and events ===
==== 2011 ====
The Titans' football team made it to the semi-finals of the high school playoffs against Fremont High School. The Titans lost the match to Fremont 21 to 14 points due to an end-of-game play by Fremont.

==== 2012 ====
The Titans' football team returned for a victorious season, led by senior quarterback Brock Anderson and senior running back Mason Woodward. In a season of being undefeated, the Titans returned to the semi-finals against Bingham High School, winning games against Viewmont High School and Alta High School. At the end of the game, the Titans stopped Bingham on the 4-yard line, securing victory.

The state championship was against the Jordan Beetdiggers.The Titans lost the game to Jordan High School with a final score of 58–2.

== Notable events ==
=== March of the Titans ===
On September 11, 2009, the first ever March of the Titans took place. The March of the Titans was an overnight event, from 9:00 PM until 9:00 AM the next morning. The biyearly event was established to help raise money for the Huntsman Cancer Institute in Salt Lake City. The over-night event had students walking or running around the track that surrounds the high school's football field. Donations were raised by local companies and private individuals based on the number of laps completed by participating students or in lump sum donations. Students participated as individuals or in teams.

Volume 3 of Syracuse High's yearbook, Mnemosyne, states that nearly 700 students were seen in attendance, with $5,754.17 raised.

=== Syracuse Strong ===
During the 2014 summer break, four Syracuse High School students died in unrelated accidents. As a result, Syracuse High students created the social media hashtag #SyracuseStrong as a method to support their peers along with sharing positive and uplifting thoughts or stories.

=== Walk-out protest ===
On Friday, May 7, 2010, Syracuse High students walked out of class during regular school hours in protest of Davis School District budget cuts. The walk-out was to show school district officials and the community the student body's dissatisfaction of the oncoming changes to Syracuse High's teaching staff and in protest of the planned expansion of the Davis High School athletic facilities. By noon, hundreds of students (between 400 and 1000) were on the west edge of the school grounds, displaying signs and chanting for passing traffic to witness.

School officials attempted to mitigate the walk-out by explaining the budget cuts in a school-wide morning announcement. Students were told that they would be cited as truant if they walked out. However, no citations were issued to students returned to class or remained at the protest.

Other Davis School District schools planned to walk out, but only Syracuse High students carried out the planned protest.

== Notable alumni ==
- Hunter Woodhall, Track and field athlete.
- Kelsey Kaufusi, soccer player, defender.
- Jackson Spencer, Long-distance and cross country runner.
