= Bessinger =

Bessinger is a surname. Notable people with the surname include:

- Maurice Bessinger (1930–2014), American BBQ restaurateur and politician
- Niko Bessinger (1948–2008), Namibian politician and independence activist
- Tradon Bessinger (2008–), American football quarterback

== See also ==
- Bissinger
