= Roger E. Barrus =

American politician (born 1949)

Member of the Utah House of Representatives from the 18th district
- In office September 18, 2000 – December 31, 2014
- Preceded by: Susan Koehn
- Succeeded by: Timothy Hawkes

Personal details
- Born: October 4, 1949 (age 76) Blackfoot, Idaho, U.S.
- Party: Republican
- Education: Utah State University
- Profession: Retired

Roger E. Barrus (born 4 October 1949) is a former Republican member of the Utah State House of Representatives representing central Davis County, Utah.

== Early life and career ==
Barrus was born October 4, 1949, in Blackfoot, Idaho. He received his B.S. in Engineering at Utah State University and worked as an environment and safety engineer until he retired. He currently lives in Centerville, UT with his wife Laurel and four children. Barrus is a member of the Church of Jesus Christ of Latter-day Saints.

== Political career ==
Barrus was elected to the Utah House of Representatives for District 18 in 2000 and has served continuously since then. In 2012 he was re-elected after beating his Democratic opponent Doug Macdonald with 74.3% of the vote.

During the 2014 General Session he served on the House Ethics Committee, the House Natural Resources, Agriculture and Environment Committee and the House Public Utilities and Technology Committee.

== 2014 Sponsored Legislation ==
Bill number	Bill title	Status
HB0027	Interlocal Cooperation Act Amendments	Governor Signed - 2/19/2014
HB0086S01	Utah Energy Infrastructure Authority Act Amendments	Governor Signed - 4/1/2014
HB0125S02	Electrical Transmission Facility Siting Study Act	House/ filed - 3/13/2014
HB0136S01	Assisted Living Facility Surveillance Act	House/ filed- 3/5/2014

Representative Barrus also floor sponsored SB0242 Alternative Energy Amendments.
