= Holly Rowe =

American sports announcer (born 1966)

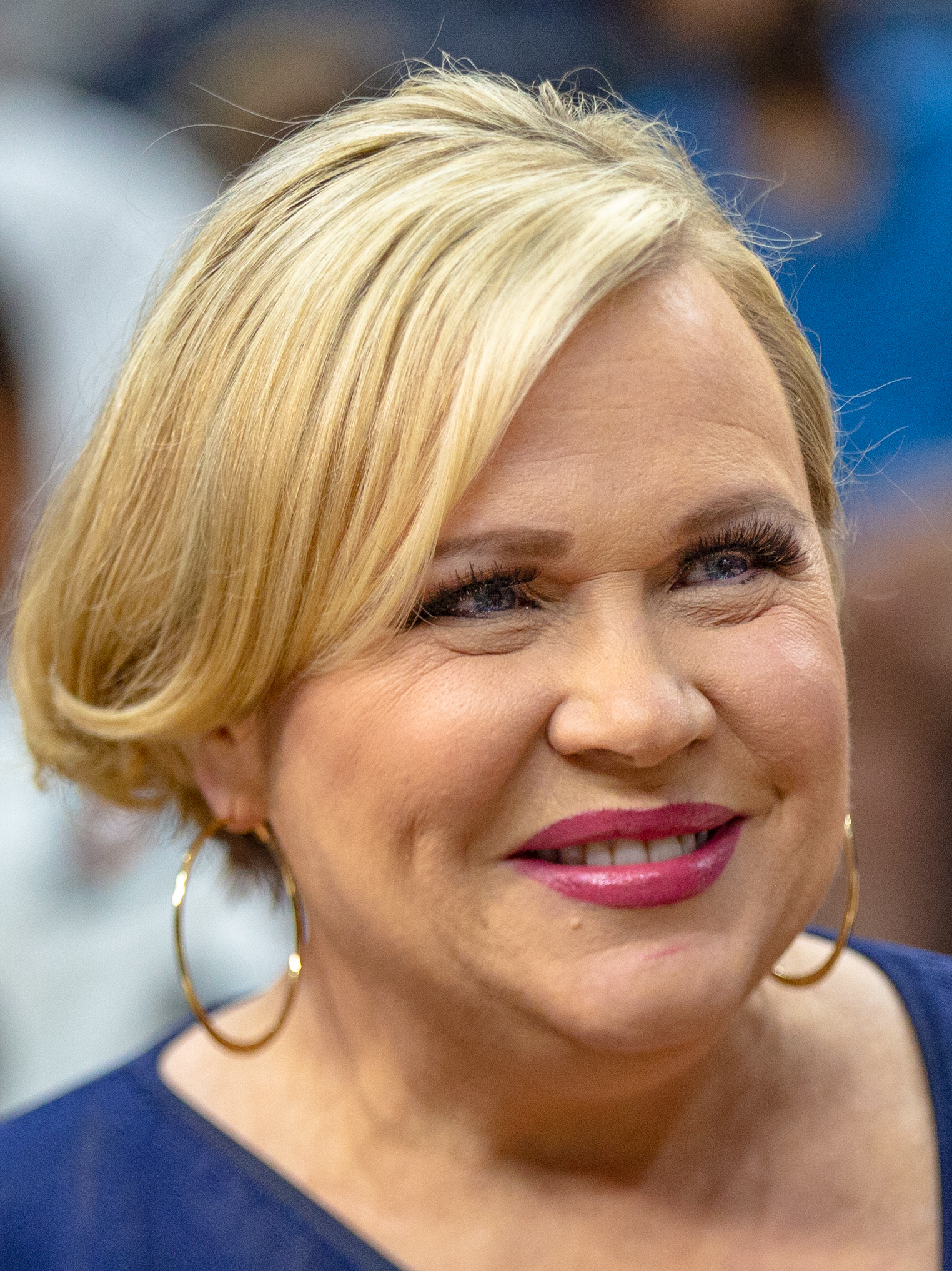
- Rowe in August 2018
- Born: June 16, 1966 (age 60); Woods Cross, Utah, U.S.
- Education: Brigham Young University (attended); University of Utah (BA)
- Occupation: Sports commentator
- Employer(s): The Walt Disney Company via ESPN Inc. including ABC; Utah Jazz; Smith Entertainment Group
- Children: 1

Holly Rowe (born June 16, 1966) is an American sports telecaster for ESPN and ABC, as a sideline reporter for college football and basketball games. Rowe made Utah Jazz history on October 22, 2021, as the team's first female commentator in a game against the Sacramento Kings.

== Early life and career ==
After graduating in 1984 from Woods Cross High School in Woods Cross, Utah, Rowe attended Brigham Young University. At BYU, she was the news anchor for the campus TV station, KBYU-TV. Rowe attended BYU for two years and then transferred to the University of Utah. While attending Utah, she worked as a sportswriter for the university's Daily Utah Chronicle and the Davis County Clipper. Rowe graduated in 1991 with a degree in journalism. Rowe then went on to an internship at CBS Sports and afterwards landed her first broadcasting role with the Blue and White Sports Network as an affiliate relations coordinator.

== Broadcasting career ==
=== ESPN ===
Rowe has been with ESPN in some capacity since 1995. Before becoming a full-time college football sideline reporter with ESPN in August 1998, she served as a part-time sideline reporter with ABC Sports in 1995 and 1996, and then for certain ESPN broadcasts during the 1997 season. She has been a part of numerous regular season games and post-season bowl games.

With ESPN, Rowe has worked women's college basketball games and women's college volleyball, generally in a play-by-play capacity (as opposed to her college football sideline duties). Other broadcasts that Rowe has been a part of during her time at ESPN include play-by-play for Women's World Cup matches, coverage of the Running of the Bulls, coverage of swimming, and broadcasts of track and field events.

Being a woman in the sports broadcasting industry, Rowe has been profiled by other media and news organizations.

She is the lead sideline reporter for ESPN's coverage of Saturday-night college football (including the College Football Playoff), women's college basketball (including the NCAA Division I women's basketball tournament), the WNBA and playoffs, the Women's College World Series and NCAA Division I women's volleyball tournament, and also works on men's college basketball and NBA.

=== Other work ===
Before and during her time with ESPN, Rowe has worked with several other broadcast organizations, as a broadcaster for women's college basketball games broadcast for Fox Sports starting in 1993. Rowe also worked as an analyst for the WNBA’s now-defunct Utah Starzz. Whilst working for the Blue & White Sports Network in Provo, Utah, Rowe covered several Western Athletic Conference (WAC) sporting events. She also held a position on the team at CBS, which produces the men's Final Four. Rowe joined the Utah Jazz broadcast team in 2021 as an analyst.

== Personal Life ==
Rowe is a Chicago Bulls fan who lives in Utah. She has a son, McKylin.
