= West Bountiful, Utah =

City in Utah, United States

- City
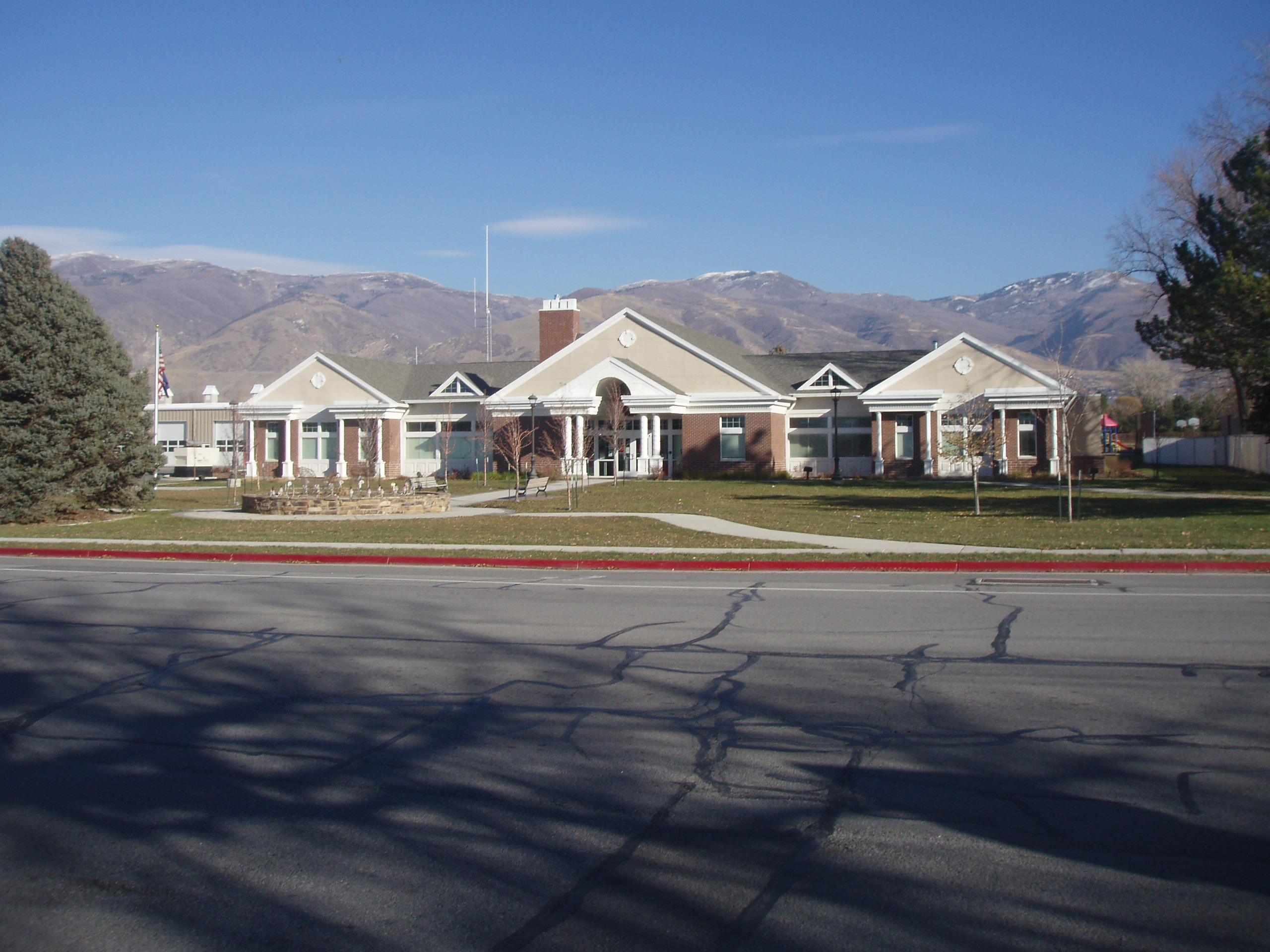
- West Bountiful City Hall

- Location in Davis County and the state of Utah
- Coordinates: 40°53′54″N 111°54′30″W
- Country: United States
- State: Utah
- County: Davis
- Settled: 1848
- Incorporated: January 28, 1949
- Became a city: November 12, 1962
- Founder: James Fackrell, Sr.
- Named for: Bountiful (Book of Mormon)

Area
  - Total: 3.32 sq mi (8.59 km^{2})
  - Land: 3.31 sq mi (8.56 km^{2})
  - Water: 0.012 sq mi (0.03 km^{2})
- Elevation: 4,232 ft (1,290 m)

Population (2020)
  - Total: 5,917
  - Density: 1,754.9/sq mi (677.57/km^{2})
- Time zone: UTC-7 (Mountain (MST))
  - Summer (DST): UTC-6 (MDT)
- ZIP code: 84087
- Area codes: 385, 801
- FIPS code: 49-82840
- GNIS feature ID: 2412217
- Website: wbcityut.gov

West Bountiful is a city in Davis County, Utah, United States. It is part of the Ogden–Clearfield, Utah Metropolitan Statistical Area. The population was 5,265 at the 2010 census, with an increased population of 5,917 by the 2020 census.

== History ==
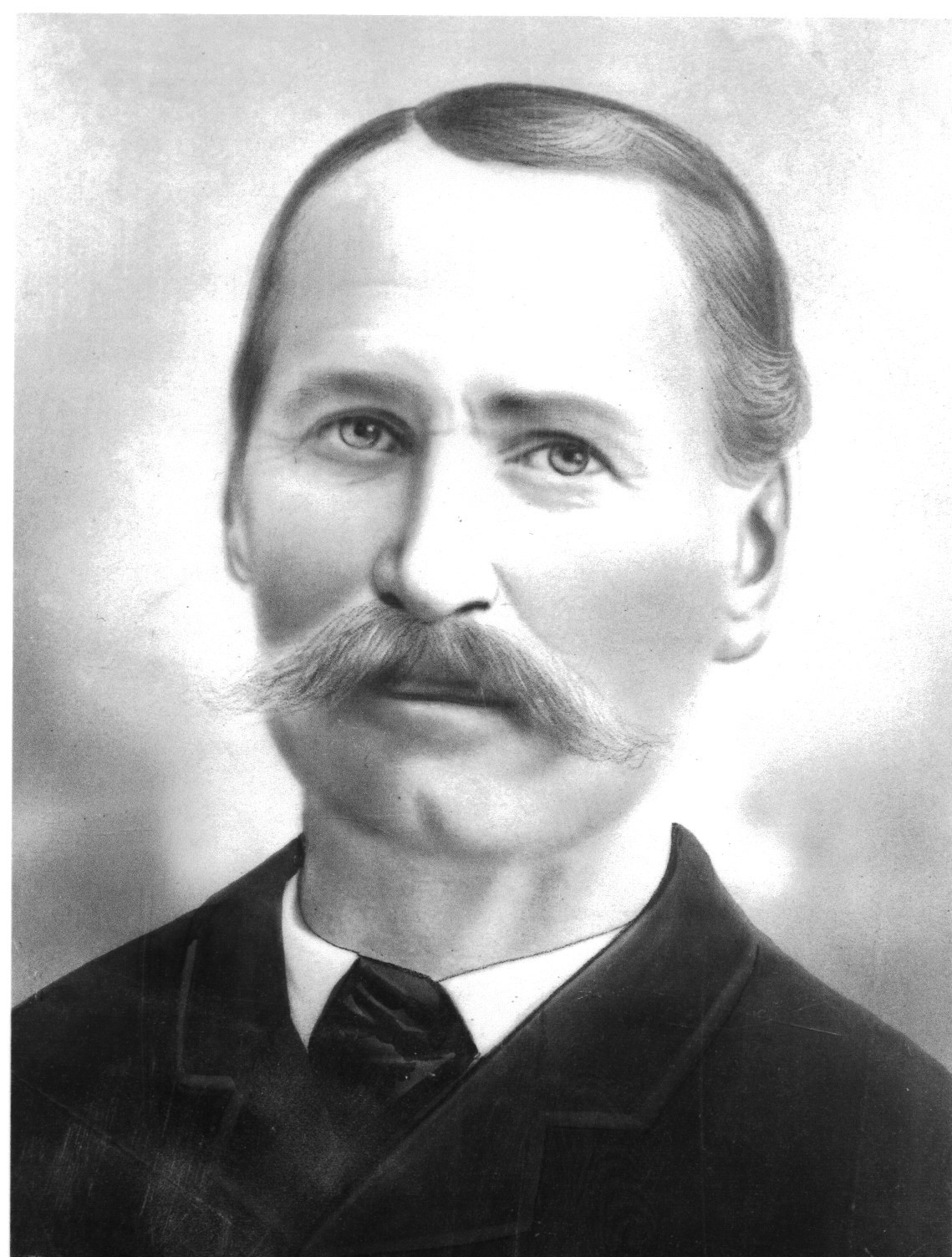
Photo of James Fackrell Senior (1787–1867)

West Bountiful was founded in 1848 by James Fackrell, Sr., a Mormon pioneer. Born in North Petherton, Somersetshire, England, in 1787, Fackrell immigrated to the United States, and after crossing the plains in 1848 with his family, settled in West Bountiful with his wife Amy Crumb.

West Bountiful was incorporated as a town on January 28, 1949, and became a third-class city on November 12, 1962.

== Geography ==
West Bountiful is located in southeastern Davis County and is bordered by Centerville to the north, Bountiful to the east, Woods Cross to the south, and Legacy Nature Preserve to the west. Interstate 15 passes through the eastern part of the city, with access from Exits 316 and 317. Downtown Salt Lake City is 11 miles (18 km) to the south.

According to the United States Census Bureau, West Bountiful has a total area of 3.2 square miles (8.4 km^{2}), of which 0.01 square miles (0.03 km^{2}), or 0.36%, is water.

== Education ==
West Bountiful is located in the Davis School District and has one school - West Bountiful Elementary. Students in the city attend Bountiful Junior High and Viewmont High School in Bountiful.

== Demographics ==
Historical population
Census	Pop.	Note	%±
1900	433		—
1910	534		23.3%
1920	573		7.3%
1930	608		6.1%
1940	951		56.4%
1950	682		−28.3%
1960	945		38.6%
1970	1,246		31.9%
1980	3,556		185.4%
1990	4,477		25.9%
2000	4,484		0.2%
2010	5,265		17.4%
2020	5,917		12.4%
U.S. Decennial Census

=== 2020 census ===
As of the 2020 census, West Bountiful had a population of 5,917. The median age was 34.9 years, with 31.0% of residents under the age of 18 and 12.9% aged 65 or older. For every 100 females there were 100.0 males, and for every 100 females age 18 and over there were 99.0 males age 18 and over.

98.4% of residents lived in urban areas, while 1.6% lived in rural areas.

There were 1,771 households in West Bountiful, of which 44.0% had children under the age of 18 living in them. Of all households, 73.6% were married-couple households, 10.6% were households with a male householder and no spouse or partner present, and 13.7% were households with a female householder and no spouse or partner present. About 12.3% of all households were made up of individuals and 6.2% had someone living alone who was 65 years of age or older.

There were 1,809 housing units, of which 2.1% were vacant. The homeowner vacancy rate was 0.4% and the rental vacancy rate was 3.3%.

Racial composition as of the 2020 census
Race	Number	Percent
White	5,277	89.2%
Black or African American	29	0.5%
American Indian and Alaska Native	22	0.4%
Asian	52	0.9%
Native Hawaiian and Other Pacific Islander	78	1.3%
Some other race	130	2.2%
Two or more races	329	5.6%
Hispanic or Latino (of any race)	358	6.1%

=== 2000 census ===
As of the census of 2000, there were 4,484 people, 1,250 households, and 1,102 families residing in the city. The population density was 1,510.6 people per square mile (582.9/km^{2}). There were 1,282 housing units at an average density of 431.9 per square mile (166.7/km^{2}). The racial makeup of the city was 96.23% White, 0.02% African American, 0.36% Native American, 0.56% Asian, 0.65% Pacific Islander, 0.83% from other races, and 1.36% from two or more races. Hispanic or Latino of any race were 2.03% of the population.

There were 1,250 households, out of which 55.0% had children under the age of 18 living with them, 76.9% were married couples living together, 8.8% had a female householder with no husband present, and 11.8% were non-families. 9.2% of all households were made up of individuals, and 2.9% had someone living alone who was 65 years of age or older. The average household size was 3.59 and the average family size was 3.84.

In the city, the population was spread out, with 35.6% under the age of 18, 12.5% from 18 to 24, 27.3% from 25 to 44, 20.4% from 45 to 64, and 4.2% who were 65 years of age or older. The median age was 27 years. For every 100 females, there were 97.8 males. For every 100 females age 18 and over, there were 99.0 males.

The median income for a household in the city was $61,063, and the median income for a family was $61,154. Males had a median income of $41,448 versus $26,168 for females. The per capita income for the city was $19,016. About 3.2% of families and 3.3% of the population were below the poverty line, including 5.2% of those under age 18 and 4.2% of those age 65 or over.

== See also ==
- Bountiful, Utah
