= Susan Koehn =

American politician (1961–2025)

Member of the Utah House of Representatives from the 18th district
- In office June 1, 1995 – August 16, 2000
- Preceded by: Karen Smith
- Succeeded by: Roger E. Barrus

Personal details
- Born: Susan Johnson; May 16, 1961
- Died: January 9, 2025 (aged 63)
- Political party: Republican
- Spouse: David Copeland
- Children: 3
- Parent(s): Brant and Janet Johnson

Susan Koehn (née Johnson; May 16, 1961 – January 9, 2025) was an American politician from the state of Utah. She served as a Republican member of the Utah House of Representatives from 1995 to 2000.

== Life and career ==
Koehn was born on May 16, 1961, the daughter of Brant and Janet Johnson. She married Gary Koehn, and they had three children. She became involved in politics, and was elected to the Woods Cross City Council in 1994.

Koehn was appointed by Governor Mike Leavitt to the Utah House of Representatives, effective June 1, 1995, to fill the seat left vacant by Karen Smith, who had moved. She was re-elected twice, and after she announced her retirement from the legislature in 2000, she co-founded a lobbying firm. After ethics concerns were raised, she resigned her seat, effective August 16, 2000.

At the age of 48, Koehn was diagnosed with breast cancer. She died from the disease on January 9, 2025, at the age of 63.

== Electoral history ==
=== 1996 ===
==== General election ====
Utah House of Representatives, District 18, 1996 general election * denotes incumbent Source:
Party	Candidate	Votes	%
Republican	Susan Koehn *	6,416	74.6
Democratic	Trudy D. Henderson	2,183	25.4
Total votes		8,599	100

=== 1998 ===
==== Primary election ====
Utah House of Representatives, District 18, 1998 primary election * denotes incumbent Source:
Party	Candidate	Votes	%
Republican	Susan Koehn *	1,579	68.8
Republican	Richard G. Brown	715	31.2
Total votes		2,294	100

==== General election ====
Utah House of Representatives, District 18, 1998 general election * denotes incumbent Source:
Party	Candidate	Votes	%
Republican	Susan Koehn *	5,400	100
Total votes		5,400	100
