= Biesinger =

Biesinger is a German surname. Notable people with the surname include:

- Rosemarie Biesinger, German canoeist
- Thomas Biesinger (1844–1931), German Mormon
- Ulrich Biesinger (1933–2011), German footballer

== See also ==
- Bissinger
