= In Our Mothers' House =

Children's book

- Author: Patricia Polacco
- Illustrator: Patricia Polacco
- Publisher: Philomel Books
- Publication date: 2009
- Pages: 48
- ISBN: 978-0-399-25076-7

In Our Mothers' House is a 2009 children's picture book written and illustrated by Patricia Polacco. It follows the story of an African American girl recounting her childhood with her two adoptive mothers and siblings. It takes on contemporary topics such as race, religion, sexuality, and family structures. Polacco's book was a point of controversy in many school districts over its progressive content, causing it to be banned across the United States. The book has also received positive feedback, being noted as a promotion of love and acceptance. Polacco's background in art aided in the telling of this story, allowing for the images to reinforce the cheerful tone of the story.

== Background ==
Polacco was born in Lansing Michigan to a Russian Jewish mother and an Irish father. She grew up in a family of storytellers who valued the oral tradition of passing their heritage verbally. She notes how her childhood shaped her to be observant and see the world through the perspective of a storyteller.

Following her childhood she attended many universities. She has earned a bachelors in fine arts, for painting, from Monash University in Melbourne Australia. She then completed her education at Royal Melbourne Institute of Technology, earning both a Masters of Art and a PhD in art history.

== Art style ==
Despite her training as a painter, in In Our Mothers' House, Polacco uses marker and pencil for her illustrations. She uses many warm toned markers to make the images bold. She then contrasts this by softening them again with pencil line work and the happy feeling of the characters' faces. She makes the characters simultaneously goofy and joyful, with their free movements creating an overall cheerful tone that coincides with the text. Polacco derives these drawings from her own experiences as a child, creating images of laughter and fun. She pays close attention to the expressions on each character's face, trying to encapsulate both their overall expressions and the finer details such as wrinkles and smiling eyes. Polacco's art style adds to the emotion of each character, allowing them to embody the role she wants them to play.

== Summary ==
In Our Mothers' House is about an African American girl who recounts her life growing up with her two adoptive mothers, Meema and Marmee, and siblings, Will and Millie. In all there are three children in her family, including herself. She has a younger brother of Asian descent, and a white little sister with red hair. The book starts with each child's adoption followed by an introduction of the mothers and their home in Berkeley, California. The narrator talks about her favorite childhood memories. The story then continues with when their extended extended family would come to visit, always entering through the kitchen. When the narrator's grandparents would visit, the kitchen was the center of the house. Her Italian grandfather was in charge of cooking, and they would all make gnocchi with ox tail, tomatoes, pork shank, and brisket. Once the food was done they would all gather as a family around the table and eat, laugh, and talk about everything under the sun. Once dinner was over all the kids would be on the steps listening to stories from their grandmothers while their mothers sat back and smiled. The story then continues with the first of their annual block parties, planned by the narrator's Marmee. She recalls how her sister Millie hand-made all of the invitations and would hand them out door to door. While doing this they come up to a house in which the mother would glare at the narrator's two mothers, showing her clear dislike. Then came the actual party. Every family had invented a game for their lawn and made food from their own cultures. As the party ends, the displeased mother from before publicly states "I don't appreciate what you two are!" The kids were confused as to why the lady hated their mothers, which was explained by Meema as "She's afraid of what she cannot understand." The narrator moves on from this to recounting how much love she felt throughout her childhood. This was highlighted by the time she and her sister volunteered to host the mother daughter tea, in which everyone gets all dressed up and has a tea party. Despite having never seen her mothers in dresses, they still went all out for their daughters, hand-making gowns for all of them. The book then ends with all of the children growing up and marrying spouses of their own, only to come back with their children to their mothers' house and feel all the same love, and watch them grow old together.

== Reception ==
There was a wide range of reception to In Our Mothers' House, both positive and negative. The book was banned or restricted in some school libraries. One such instance took place in May 2012 in Utah's Davis School District. The book was ordered to be kept behind the library's desk and not to be lent out to children without explicit written consent from their parents. The ban originated from a parental complaint made after seeing their kindergartener come home with the book, citing that it "normalizes a lifestyle we don't agree with." The book was to be moved from free reading material for all ages to fiction for third to sixth graders. The parent and 23 others pushed for the book to be banned from the library. There was then a vote by the district's reconsideration committee in which it was decided 6–1 on May 8th to put the book under restricted access, citing a Utah state law that prohibits "the advocacy of homosexuality" in school materials. This prompted further banning of books with homosexual themes. This decision was eventually overturned altogether in January 2013 after another parent filed a lawsuit under the First Amendment to the United States Constitution. This elicited positive reactions towards the book. In reaction to the Utah banning, the Salt Lake Tribune released a piece commenting that the book was a promotion of "love of family, friends, and community" that belonged on library shelves.

Multiple school districts in Texas banned In Our Mothers' House, including Granbury Independent School District, San Antonio North East Independent School District, and McKinney Independent School District. The Granbury banning included 133 other books. This came directly from the school board following State Representative Matt Krause targeting 839 books, in which he asked for audits from the schools on how much was spent to obtain them. Most of the books banned in this district had themes of racism, homosexuality, sex education, or abortion. The San Antonio banning followed similar reasons. In this case the book was banned alongside 430 other books following Krause's list. The official banning came just after Senator Greg Abbott called for an investigation into many school books, citing "pornography." In McKinney two parents challenged 280 titles that were also all on Krause's list. All of these challenges cited the same objection: "Contains 1 or more of the following: Marxism, incest, sexual explicit material—in written form and/ or visual pictures, pornography, CRT, immoral activities, rebellious against parents, and the material contradicts the ISD’s student handbook". This was then backed up by State representative Jared Patterson who said "I’ve been the face of this movement for the last six months."

In addition to these negative responses the book has also received positive attention. The book has been noted as celebrating diversity of races, religions, and sexual identities as well as their commonality. It has been described as being able to "help youngsters better understand their world."

== Honors ==
- 2010 Rainbow Book List
- 2010 Notable Social Studies Trade Books For Young People
