= Kevin Dyson =

American football player (born 1975)

No. 87, 85
- Position: Wide receiver

Personal information
- Born: June 23, 1975 (age 51); Logan, Utah, U.S.
- Listed height: 6 ft 1 in (1.85 m)
- Listed weight: 208 lb (94 kg)

Career information
- High school: Clearfield (Clearfield, Utah)
- College: Utah
- NFL draft: 1998: 1st round, 16th overall pick

Career history
- Tennessee Oilers/Titans (1998–2002); Carolina Panthers (2003); San Diego Chargers (2004)*; Washington Redskins (2005)*
- * Offseason or practice squad member only

Awards and highlights
- Senior Bowl MVP (1998); 2× first-team All-WAC (1996, 1997); Freedom Bowl champion (1994)

Career NFL statistics
- Receptions: 178
- Receiving yards: 2,325
- Receiving touchdowns: 18
- Stats at Pro Football Reference

Kevin Tyree Dyson (born June 23, 1975) is an American former professional football player who was a wide receiver in the National Football League (NFL). He played college football for the Utah Utes. He was selected by the Tennessee Oilers 16th overall in the 1998 NFL draft.

Dyson is best known for his part in two historic NFL plays – the Music City Miracle and The Tackle. He and his brother Andre were the first brothers in NFL history to score touchdowns in the same game.

After his football career ended, Dyson earned two master's degrees and a doctorate, and became the principal of a middle school, then a high school.

== Early life and college ==
Born in Logan, Utah, Dyson graduated in 1993 from Clearfield High School in Clearfield, Utah. In the fall of his senior year, he helped his team win the 1992 State 4A championship.

At the University of Utah, Dyson played on the Utah Utes football team for five seasons (1993–1997) and graduated in 1997 with a Bachelor of Science in sociology. In his four seasons as a starter, Dyson caught 192 passes for 2,726 yards and 18 touchdowns.

== Professional football career ==
Pre-draft measurables
Height	Weight	Arm length	Hand span
6 ft 1 1/8 in (1.86 m)	199 lb (90 kg)	34 1/4 in (0.87 m)	10 1/8 in (0.26 m)
All values from NFL Combine

Dyson played for the Tennessee Titans from 1998 to 2002, wearing #87. In the 1999 playoffs, he was involved in two of the most memorable plays in NFL history. Dyson was the recipient of Frank Wycheck's lateral known by many as the Music City Miracle, and he was tackled by Mike Jones one yard short of scoring the probable game-tying/winning touchdown as time expired in Super Bowl XXXIV, in a play known as The Tackle.

Dyson played for the Carolina Panthers in 2003 but saw very little action due to injury. He did appear briefly in Super Bowl XXXVIII. The San Diego Chargers acquired Dyson for the 2004 season, but later released him. In 2005 he signed with the Washington Redskins but was cut on September 3 when teams reduced their rosters to the final 53 players. He finished his 6 NFL seasons with 178 receptions for 2,325 yards and 18 touchdowns in 59 regular-season games.

== NFL career statistics ==
Year	Team	Games		Receiving					Rushing				
Year	Team	GP	GS	Rec	Yds	Avg	Lng	TD	Att	Yds	Avg	Lng	TD
1998	TEN	13	9	21	263	12.5	45	2	1	4	4.0	4	0
1999	TEN	16	16	54	658	12.2	47	4	1	3	3.0	3	0
2000	TEN	2	2	6	104	17.3	30	1	—	—	—	—	—
2001	TEN	16	16	54	825	15.3	68	7	—	—	—	—	—
2002	TEN	11	11	41	460	11.2	40	4	2	-4	-2.0	5	0
2003	CAR	1	0	2	15	7.5	9	0	—	—	—	—	—
Career		59	54	178	2,325	13.1	68	18	4	3	0.8	5	0

== Coaching and education career ==
After retiring from football, Dyson went on to earn a Master of Education degree from Trevecca Nazarene University in 2007, and followed that up with a doctorate from the same school.

Dyson was a counselor and wide receiver coach at Glencliff Comprehensive High School in Nashville from 2007 to 2009. Since 2008, Dyson has been on the board of the organization Students Taking A Right Stand. He later left to serve as the receivers and backs coach for Independence High School at Thompson's Station, Tennessee as well as the athletic director, eventually ascending to head coach in 2010. Dyson served as an assistant principal at Independence High School and as the principal of Grassland Middle School in Franklin, Tennessee. On April 22, 2021, he was named principal at Centennial High School in Franklin.

== Personal life ==
Dyson is the older brother of NFL cornerback and former Titans teammate Andre Dyson. He lived in Nashville and Salt Lake City during his football career.
