= Colby Bockwoldt =

American football player (born 1981)

No. 57, 52, 50
- Position: Linebacker

Personal information
- Born: April 14, 1981 (age 45); Ogden, Utah, U.S.
- Listed height: 6 ft 1 in (1.85 m)
- Listed weight: 237 lb (108 kg)

Career information
- High school: Northridge (Layton, Utah)
- College: BYU
- NFL draft: 2004: 7th round, 240th overall pick

Career history
- New Orleans Saints (2004–2005); Tennessee Titans (2006); San Francisco 49ers (2007)*; Cleveland Browns (2007); Florida Tuskers (2009)
- * Offseason or practice squad member only

Career NFL statistics
- Total tackles: 160
- Sacks: 2
- Fumble recoveries: 3
- Pass deflections: 4
- Defensive touchdowns: 1
- Stats at Pro Football Reference

Colby Aaron Bockwoldt (born April 14, 1981) is an American former professional football player who was a linebacker in the National Football League (NFL). He played college football for the BYU Cougars and was selected by the New Orleans Saints in the seventh round of the 2004 NFL draft with the 240th overall pick.

Bockwoldt was also member of the Tennessee Titans, San Francisco 49ers, Cleveland Browns and Florida Tuskers.

== Early life ==
Colby played linebacker and tight end during the 1996–1998 football seasons at Northridge High School in Layton, Utah. He was a two-year starter and earned All-State honors in both years. In 1998 Colby was selected as the States Defensive MVP. He still holds many defensive records at Northrige High School. Colby's Jersey, #46, was retired in early 2007.

== College career ==
Attended Brigham Young University from 1999 to 2004. Colby started for 2 1/2 seasons and was a special teams contributor throughout his career. He received numerous awards including USA Today HM All-American, All-Conference, Academic All-Conference, and many team awards.

== Professional career ==
=== New Orleans Saints ===
He started his career with the New Orleans Saints where he played 2004, starting half of the season, and 2005, leading the team in tackles with over 100.

=== Tennessee Titans ===
In 2006, he signed a one-year deal with the Tennessee Titans.

=== San Francisco 49ers ===
On March 19, 2007, he signed a one-year deal with the San Francisco 49ers. On September 1, 2007 the 49ers cut him.

=== Cleveland Browns ===
He signed with the Cleveland Browns on December 5, 2007 when linebacker Kris Griffin was placed on injured reserve. On December 12, 2007, he was released from the Browns.

=== Florida Tuskers ===
Bockwoldt was signed by the Florida Tuskers of the United Football League on August 25, 2009.

== NFL career statistics ==
Legend
**Bold**	Career high

Year	Team	Games		Tackles					Interceptions					Fumbles			
Year	Team	GP	GS	Cmb	Solo	Ast	Sck	TFL	Int	Yds	TD	Lng	PD	FF	FR	Yds	TD
2004	NOR	**16**	7	46	40	6	**1.0**	1	0	0	0	0	1	0	**1**	**6**	**1**
2005	NOR	**16**	**16**	**89**	**60**	**29**	0.0	**6**	0	0	0	0	**3**	0	**1**	0	0
2006	TEN	**16**	1	23	14	9	**1.0**	1	0	0	0	0	0	0	**1**	0	0
2007	CLE	1	0	2	2	0	0.0	0	0	0	0	0	0	0	0	0	0
		49	24	160	116	44	2.0	8	0	0	0	0	4	0	3	6	1
