= Davis High School (Utah) =

Location
- 325 South Main Street; Kaysville, Utah 84037; 41°01′45″N 111°55′50″W

Information
- Type: Public, coeducational
- Principal: Lori Hawthorne
- Teaching staff: 85.57 (FTE)
- Grades: 10–12
- Enrollment: 2,225 (2023–2024)
- Student to teacher ratio: 26.00
- Color
- Mascot: Dart Man
- Website: dhs.davis.k12.ut.us

Davis High School is a public school located in Kaysville, Utah, United States. It is operated by the Davis School District. Known as the Davis Darts, the mascot of the school is Dart Man. One of the largest and oldest high schools in the state, the school was established in 1914 and underwent reconstruction during the 2003–2004 school year.

== Academics ==
In 2019, U.S. News & World Report ranked Davis as the #1 traditional high school and #4 overall high school in the state of Utah with a 98% graduation rate. In 2007, Davis High School had the highest number of AP exams taken (1,598) as well as the highest percent of AP exams passed (89.1%) in Utah. The school had a 99% graduation rate in the 2013–2014 school year.

== Clubs ==
Davis offers many student-sponsored and school-sponsored activities and clubs, including DECA, FBLA, FCCLA, Hope Squad, HOSA, Speech & Debate (NSDA), Interact, Key Club, Latinos in Action, Model UN, National Honor Society, Skills USA, and VEX Robotics.

== Marching Band ==
The Davis High School Marching Band has been a 2000 and 2008–2015 Bands of America regional finalist (in which it finished in the top 5). It participated in the Rose Parades of 2003 and 2013 and marched in the Macy's Thanksgiving Day Parade in New York City in 2017.

The 2011 field show, Boo! In the Hall of the Mountain King, took either first or second in every Utah competition, as well as a third-place finish in the Bands of America Regional Championship. The 2016 show, Power of One, took second or third in every Utah competition and sixth-place at the Bands of America Regional Championship. The 2017 show, I Thank You for the Music, took second in every Utah competition and fourth place at the Bands of America Regional Championship. The school's drumline has won multiple IMPA state championships.

== Theatre ==
The Davis Theatre program has won a number of awards from Utah Festival Opera and Musical Theatre, including:

- 2019, Best Ensemble for its production of Newsies
- 2020, Best Musical for its production of Matilda
- 2022, Best Musical for its production of Bright Star
- 2023, Best Scenic Design and Best Costume Design for its production of A Christmas Story
- 2025, Best Scenic Design for Beauty and the Beast
- 2026, Best Choreography for Catch Me If You Can
- 2026, Best Musical for the production of Catch Me If You Can (musical)

In 2023 Davis High School was awarded the Best of State Award for Theatrical Instruction in the State of Utah from the Best of State awards organization. Quote from best of State program: “Davis High Theatre is the premier High School Theatre program in the state of Utah. Led by teacher and director, Michael Wright, a lifelong performer and a member of the Screen Actors Guild (SAG), the program has reached a new level.”

== Athletics ==
Davis has won the second highest number of Utah high school athletic championships (94) in the state of Utah. In football, Davis has the most victories in state history (590+), has won 8 state titles, and celebrated 100 years of competition in 2015. In boys' basketball, Davis has also won 8 state titles—the first being in 1920.

The Darts participate in class 6A, the highest classification of high school athletics in the state. The 2017–18 boys' golf team was the first team to win a 6A state title in any sport when 6A was introduced in the state in 2017. Davis won the state 5A football championship in 2004 and the boys 5A state basketball championship in 2002 led by Utah Mr. Basketball Brody Van Brocklin. Most recently, they won the 2024-25 basketball state championship.

Boys' track and field has won 20 state championship titles since 1941—the most in the state. Girls' track and field has 11 state championship titles. Numerous track and field athletes hold individual state records.

Boys' and girls' cross country, golf, and soccer teams have won multiple state titles. Girls' soccer has repeatedly been nationally ranked in the top 10 by USA Today and MaxPreps. The drill team, known as the Davis High D'ettes, won three consecutive state championships from 1990–1992. In club sports, Davis won back-to-back state hockey championships in 2001 and 2002.

Davis has been the recipient of the Deseret News All-Sports Award for the 2004–2005, 2009–2010, 2011–2012, and 2014–2015 school years.

In 2025, Davis won the 6A State Championship for varsity basketball against Herriman High School.

== School Store ==

Davis High School has a student-run school store called the Dart Mart that is open A days at lunch. The store sells Davis swag and is operated by student body officers.

The school's former building, which stood from 1914 until 2003, housed a store called the Canteen. In the new building, the store was renamed The Point and has since closed due to federal government restrictions on what food items could be sold. It offered food and beverage items as well as school-related merchandise.

== Rivalries ==
Davis has several rivalries, including with Layton High School, Farmington High School, Viewmont High School, and American Fork High School. The Layton and Farmington rivalry is a typical high school rivalry, while the American Fork rivalry is primarily in marching band and the Viewmont Rivalry has abated due Davis moving up to 6A and Viewmont staying in 5A.

Davis-Layton rivalry began when Layton opened in 1966. Incidents have included vandalism of playing fields, graffiti on school buildings, fights between students, and pranks among players at competitive events.

The Davis-American Fork rivalry is primarily between the schools' marching bands and cross country programs. In the Battle of the Bands, Davis and American Fork are regularly competing for the top spot in Utah competitions. In cross country, the schools are always close in competitions and both have been ranked nationally in the top 25.

== Notable alumni ==
- Tradon Bessinger, college football quarterback for the Iowa Hawkeyes
- Rob Bishop, former member of the U.S. House of Representatives
- Nolan Bushnell, businessman and electrical engineer; co-founder of Atari, Inc.; developer of Pong; founder of Chuck E. Cheese
- Mikayla Cluff, professional soccer player for the Utah Royals
- James Cowser, former professional football player
- Will Ferrin, college football kicker for the BYU Cougars
- Bernard Francis Fisher, first living member of the United States Air Force to receive the Medal of Honor
- Takuo Miyagishima, design engineer who worked for Panavision
- Cal Rampton, 11th Governor of Utah
- Jill Stevens, Miss Utah 2007
- Daniel Summerhays, professional golfer
- Matthew Simmons, investment banker and author; founder of Simmons & Company International
- Olivia Wade-Katoa, professional soccer player for Portland Thorns FC
- Jared Ward, long-distance runner who competed at the 2016 Summer Olympics
- Koko Warner climate scientist
- Courtney Wayment, professional runner and 4x NCAA champion
