= Andre Dyson =

American football player and coach (born 1979)

- Dyson during his tenure with the Jets

Personal information
- Born: May 25, 1979 (age 47); Las Vegas, Nevada, U.S.
- Listed height: 5 ft 10 in (1.78 m)
- Listed weight: 183 lb (83 kg)

Career information
- College: Utah
- NFL draft: 2001: 2nd round, 60th overall pick

Career history

Playing
- Tennessee Titans (2001–2004); Seattle Seahawks (2005); New York Jets (2006–2007)

Coaching
- Weber State (2009–2011) Assistant coach; Weber HS (UT) (2012–2013) Defensive coordinator; Clearfield HS (UT) (2014–2020) Head coach; Weber State (2021–2025) Cornerbacks coach

Awards and highlights
- First-team All-MW (2000); Second-team All-MW (1999)

Career NFL statistics
- Total tackles: 320
- Sacks: 1
- Forced fumbles: 4
- Pass deflections: 81
- Interceptions: 22
- Defensive touchdowns: 5
- Stats at Pro Football Reference

Andre Dyson (born May 25, 1979) is an American college football coach and former player who is the cornerbacks coach for Weber State University, a position he has held since 2021. He played professionally as a cornerback in the National Football League (NFL). He played college football for the Utah Utes and was selected by the Tennessee Titans in the second round of the 2001 NFL draft.

== Early life ==
Andre Dyson was born on May 25, 1979, in Las Vegas, Nevada. He grew up most of his life in Clinton, Utah, and attended West Clinton Elementary School. He also attended Syracuse Junior High School, and Clearfield High School. While attending Clearfield, Dyson lettered in football, soccer, and basketball. In football, as a senior, he was named the team's Defensive Most Valuable Player, and was an All-Region selection, an All-Area selection, and an All-State selection. In soccer, he was a second-team All-State selection.

== Professional career ==
Pre-draft measurables
Height	Weight	Broad jump
5 ft 10 in (1.78 m)	179 lb (81 kg)	9 ft 11 in (3.02 m)
All values from NFL Combine

Dyson received the NFC defensive player of the week in 2005 for his performance on Monday Night Football in week 13. Dyson returned both an interception (72 yards) and fumble (25 yards) for touchdowns in a 42-0 Seattle Seahawks win against the Philadelphia Eagles on December 5, 2005. On February 26, 2008, the New York Jets released him.

== Coaching career ==
In 2009, Dyson joined Weber State as an assistant coach.

In 2012, Dyson was hired as the defensive coordinator for Weber High School.

In 2014, Dyson was hired as the head football coach for Clearfield High School. He resigned following the 2020 season.

In 2021, Dyson was hired as the cornerbacks coach for Weber State.

== Career statistics ==
=== NFL ===
Legend
	Led the league
**Bold**	Career high

==== Regular season ====
Year	Team	Games		Tackles					Interceptions					Fumbles			
Year	Team	GP	GS	Cmb	Solo	Ast	Sck	TFL	Int	Yds	TD	Lng	PD	FF	FR	Yds	TD
2001	TEN	14	12	59	55	4	0.0	1	3	36	0	36	**16**	1	0	0	0
2002	TEN	**16**	**16**	61	**56**	5	**1.0**	**3**	3	27	1	16	14	**2**	0	0	0
2003	TEN	**16**	**16**	**65**	54	**11**	0.0	0	4	62	**2**	51	14	0	0	0	0
2004	TEN	**16**	**16**	41	35	6	0.0	0	**6**	**135**	0	44	15	0	0	0	0
2005	SEA	10	5	21	20	1	0.0	0	1	72	1	**72**	10	1	**1**	**25**	**1**
2006	NYJ	15	15	62	51	**11**	0.0	1	4	-3	0	0	8	0	0	0	0
2007	NYJ	9	0	11	11	0	0.0	0	1	0	0	0	4	0	0	0	0
		96	80	320	282	38	1.0	5	22	329	4	72	81	4	1	25	1

==== Playoffs ====
Year	Team	Games		Tackles					Interceptions					Fumbles			
Year	Team	GP	GS	Cmb	Solo	Ast	Sck	TFL	Int	Yds	TD	Lng	PD	FF	FR	Yds	TD
2002	TEN	2	**2**	2	2	0	0.0	0	0	0	0	0	1	0	0	0	0
2003	TEN	2	**2**	**5**	**5**	0	0.0	0	**1**	0	0	0	**3**	0	0	0	0
2005	SEA	**3**	**2**	3	3	0	0.0	**1**	0	0	0	0	2	0	0	0	0
2006	NYJ	1	1	2	2	0	0.0	0	0	0	0	0	0	0	0	0	0
		8	7	12	12	0	0.0	1	1	0	0	0	6	0	0	0	0

=== Head coaching record ===
Year	Team	Overall	Conference	Standing	Bowl/playoffs
**Clearfield Falcons** () (2014–2020)
2014	Clearfield	2–8	1–5	6th	
2015	Clearfield	0–10	0–6	7th	
2016	Clearfield	2–9	1–6	7th	
2017	Clearfield	5–5	2–4	5th	
2018	Clearfield	1–8	0–6	7th	
2019	Clearfield	1–9	1–5	6th	
2020	Clearfield	3–8	2–5	7th	
Clearfield:		14–57	7–37		
Total:		14–57			

== Personal life ==
Dyson is the younger brother of former NFL wide receiver and Titans teammate Kevin Dyson. They were the first brothers in NFL history to score touchdowns in the same game.
