= Koko Warner =

US environmental scientist

- Education: University of Vienna (PhD); George Washington University (MA); Brigham Young University (BS)
- Scientific career
- Fields: Climate change Sustainability
- Workplaces: United Nations University; University of Pennsylvania; Swiss Federal Institute for Snow & Avalanche Research; Munich Climate Insurance Initiative; United Nations Framework Convention on Climate Change
- Website: global.upenn.edu/perryworldhouse/expert/koko-warner

Koko Warner is a climate change expert who specializes in human migration and displacement and who holds a PhD in economics from the University of Vienna. In 2014, the International Council for Science named Warner as one of the top 20 women making contributions to climate change debate.

== Education ==
Warner attended Davis High School in Kaysville, Utah, and graduated in 1990. After graduation, Warner attended Brigham Young University and completed her bachelor's degree in both international relations and economic development. She attended the George Washington University and completed a master's degree in development and environmental economics and international development.

In 1996, Warner was selected as a Fulbright scholar and studied at the University of Vienna where she gained a doctorate degree in economics in 2001. She continued research at the University of Vienna until 2003.

== Academic career ==
In 2006, Warner joined the United Nations University as an expert and section head in the Institute for Environment and Human Security. Since 2019, Warner has been a visiting fellow at the University of Pennsylvania's Perry World House. There, she speaks to students about the interdisciplinary aspects of climate-induced displacement and the challenges that current and future policymakers will face as climate change continues to alter the social and legal definitions of refugees.

== Professional career ==
=== Climate insurance ===
Warner joined the Swiss Federal Institute for Snow and Avalanche Research, a program within ETH Zurich, a public research university in Switzerland in 2003. There, she contributed to studies that analyzed the connections between economics and climate change. From 2003 to 2006, Warner researched how global financial structures could be changed to help climate-related adaptation efforts, particularly in developing regions.

Warner's work with climate finance and the ratification of the Kyoto Protocol in 2005 led her to found the Munich Climate Change Insurance Initiative (MCII) in April 2005, where she served as executive director until 2016. MCII's role as a think tank is to devise insurance strategies that can appropriately address climate change-related impacts.

=== Migration and displacement ===
The Environmental Change and Forced Migration Scenarios (EACH-FOR) project, under the European Commission, brought on Warner as a contributing member in 2007. There, she and other experts studied how climate change affected human migration around the world. One year later, in 2009, Warner helped to bring together the Climate Change, Environment, and Migration Alliance (CCEMA), an informal coalition to create and sustain a dialogue surrounding the complex nature of climate change. CCEMA member organizations included the likes of the World Wildlife Fund, the Munich Re Foundation, and the United Nations University, among others, but the project was discontinued.

Warner was a lead author for the IPCC Fifth Assessment Report and sixth IPCC assessment reports on climate change in 2014 and 2021, respectively. The same year, the International Council for Science named Warner as one of the top 20 women making contributions to climate change debate prior to the Paris climate accord discussions that would occur in 2015.

In 2016, Warner left her positions at the United Nations University and MCII to join the United Nations Framework Convention on Climate Change (UNFCCC) as a Manager on the Impacts, Vulnerability, and Risks subprogram. There, she provides counsel to scientists and policymakers in their efforts to create climate-related mitigation and adaptation plans around the world. In her role as a Climate Secretariat with the UNFCCC, Warner attends and speaks at the Conference of the parties convention (COP) yearly. She has spoken on human migration as a response to climate change at the yearly COP since at least 2017. In 2021, Warner was a part of an effort to bring more indigenous voices to the COP to bring about the legitimization of local and traditional knowledge. This initiative led to a greater emphasis on bringing local expertise to the conference in 2022.

In August 2022, three months before COP27, Warner stressed the importance on following through with recommended migration and financial policies from past conferences and asked the United Nations to be a network that allows its member nations to lessen the impact of human displacement. At COP27, Warner moderated a multinational panel on the broad impacts of human displacement and migration caused by climate change.

== Notable published works ==
- Warner, K. (2012). Human Migration and Displacement in the Context of Adaptation to Climate Change: The Cancun Adaptation Framework and Potential for Future Action. Environment and Planning C: Government and Policy, 30(6), 1061–1077. https://doi.org/10.1068/c1209j
- IPCC, 2014: Climate Change 2014: Synthesis Report. Contribution of Working Groups I, II and III to the Fifth Assessment Report of the Intergovernmental Panel on Climate Change [Core Writing Team, R.K. Pachauri and L.A. Meyer (eds.)]. IPCC, Geneva, Switzerland, 151 pp.
- IPCC, 2022: Climate Change 2022: Impacts, Adaptation, and Vulnerability. Contribution of Working Group II to the Sixth Assessment Report of the Intergovernmental Panel on Climate Change [H.-O. Pörtner, D.C. Roberts, M. Tignor, E.S. Poloczanska, K. Mintenbeck, A. Alegría, M. Craig, S. Langsdorf, S. Löschke, V. Möller, A. Okem, B. Rama (eds.)]. Cambridge University Press. Cambridge University Press, Cambridge, UK and New York, NY, USA, 3056 pp., doi:10.1017/9781009325844
