= Northridge High School (Layton, Utah) =

Coordinates: 41°05′44″N 111°58′15″W

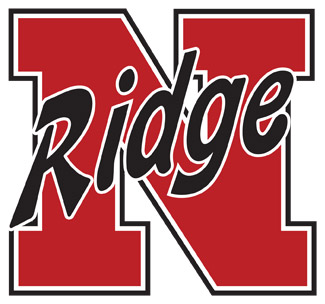

Location
- 2430 N Hillfield Road; Layton, Utah 84041; United States

Information
- Type: Public
- Established: 1992
- School district: Davis School District
- Principal: Tyler Poll
- Teaching staff: 75.42
- Grades: 10-12
- Enrollment: 1,955 (2023–2024)
- Student to teacher ratio: 25.92
- Colors: Cardinal Red,Silver,Black and White
- Athletics: Baseball, basketball, cross country, football, golf, soccer, swimming, tennis, track, volleyball, wrestling
- Mascot: Knights
- Website: https://nhs.davis.k12.ut.us/

Northridge High School (NHS) is a publicly funded high school located in Layton, Utah, United States. It was opened in 1992 and is part of the Davis School District.

Its attendance boundary includes the on-post housing at Hill Air Force Base.

== History ==
Northridge High School opened in the fall of 1992 as one of seven comprehensive 5A high schools within the Davis School District.

== Extracurricular activities ==
The Knights have been good in athletics in their history. From 2001 to 2003, they won three Utah class 5-A state football championships, and finished just short of a fourth consecutive title in 2004, after starting the season 11-0 and Losing to Skyline High School 21–7 in the state semifinals. The Knights also held a 5A State Title in men's track and field during the school's inaugural year in 1994.

Northridge placed second in the 5A Men's Golf Championships in 2002, and placed second in the 5A Men's Wrestling Championships in 2005. The school's club varsity hockey team placed third in the 2002 state championship.

They also have a four-year championship AFJROTC Ranger team, and their AFJROTC program has a national championship drill team.

The cheerleaders were West Coast Champions in 2010.

The Cardinelles were Region Champions in 2007, 2008, and 2010. They placed in the top 5 in state in 2007, and 2008. Their military routine took first in state in 2007. Their kick routine took fourth in state in 2010. They were National Champions in 2007, and Grand National Champions in 2008, and 2010.

The Knights boys' basketball team won the Region 1 title in 2012.

The school has an active ROTC, and has also participated in the Science Olympiad.

The school also has a cinema club, an Eco club, an ultimate club, a young democrats and a young conservatives club, a multicultural club, a d&d club, journalism, swing dance, uplift studios, GSA, gaming, and a sign language club.

The school host DECA, FBLA, FCCLA, HOSA, SkillsUSA, TSA, MESA, HOPE squad, and a REAL team. They also have an honor society.

The school has a theater program that has won 1st place in choreography from the Utah high school musical theater awards for three consecutive years for Anything Goes, Newsies, and West Side Story. They have been ranked in the top 10 of the best musical pits in the state of Utah.

== Notable alumni ==
- James Parker, Olympian
- Colby Bockwoldt, NFL football player
- Daniel Coats, NFL football player
- Tiffany Coyne, model
- Dayan Lake, NFL football player
- LeafyIsHere, Content Creator
