= Hope Squad =

Youth mental health program

Hope Squad is an evidence based peer-to-peer suicide prevention program with a purpose of fostering human connection, community, and hope. Hope Squad is recognized by the Suicide Prevention Resource Center’s Best Practices Registry.

Thousands of schools across the United States and Canada benefit from Hope Squad's educational program developed to address mental health and suicide prevention in schools. It was founded in 2004.

== The Hope Squad Approach ==
CDC data indicates that suicide is a leading cause of death among youth. Hope Squad aims to reduce youth suicide through peer intervention, education, and stigma reduction.

A Hope Squad is a group of students nominated by their peers who meet regularly with trained advisors to talk and learn about mental health. Members are trained to note signs of distress and intentionally reach out, connecting peers to help and hope. Hope Squads connect with the entire student body, working to reduce stigma and have a positive impact on their community's culture.

The Hope Squad suicide prevention model connects gatekeeper training, psychoeducation, a peer-to-peer approach, and community engagement to reduce the risk of suicide. Core suicide prevention competencies are woven throughout each element to build the knowledge and skills that empower students to connect peers to trusted adults.

== Learning Objectives ==
Through Hope Squad programming, age-appropriate content aims to help members learn and share with their peers about topics important for mental wellness:

- Gatekeeper Training: Students learn in age-appropriate ways about suicide warning signs and what to do when a peer is in crisis.
- Building Relationships: Students learn about effective communication and how to mediate conflict.
- Cultivating Empathy: Students work to foster kindness and create welcoming environments for all.
- Developing Resilience: Students aim to manage emotions, expectations, and change.
- Understanding Ourselves: Students build healthy habits for self-care and stress management.
- Bullying Prevention: Students understand the impact of bullying and how to prevent it.
- Developing Emotional Intelligence: Students increase awareness to strengthen leadership capabilities.
- Constructive Choices: Students learn to face challenges and develop good decision-making skills.

== Hope Squad Impact ==
Research has indicated that Hope Squad has a positive impact on the schools and communities that implement the program:

- A peer reviewed study found that schools with Hope Squads experience significantly less suicide-related stigma.
- 98% of school administrators with a Hope Squad agree that Hope Squad programming promotes a positive school climate for their students.
- Over 95% of mental health referrals in schools with Hope Squads come from non-Hope Squad members, demonstrating the program's school-wide impact on increasing help-seeking behaviors.

== History ==
It was founded by Greg Hudnall, a former principal in Provo, Utah, following a series of student suicides, the most notable occurring in 1997 involving a 14-year-old student.

The program's development involved collaboration with Brigham Young University, Wasatch Mental Health, and other organizations, leading to the formation of Hope4Utah. Initially focused on high schools, the scope of Hope Squad expanded to include elementary schools after the suicide of a fourth-grade student.

Hope Squad's approach involves training students to recognize and respond to mental distress and suicidal ideation among their peers. Its establishment was a response to high rates of youth suicide in the western United States, particularly in Utah, where it has become the leading cause of death among individuals aged 10 to 18.

The program began in Utah, where it was implemented in 70 percent of schools, and subsequently expanded to other states including Wyoming and Alaska. Its growth continued across the United States and Canada, leading to the formation of numerous Hope Squad chapters.
