= Tradon Bessinger =

American football player (born 2008)

Iowa Hawkeyes
- Position: Quarterback
- Class: Freshman

Personal information
- Born: March 1, 2008 (age 18)
- Listed height: 6 ft 4 in (1.93 m)
- Listed weight: 210 lb (95 kg)

Career information
- High school: Davis (Kaysville, Utah)
- College: Iowa (2026–present)

Tradon Bessinger (born March 1, 2008) is an American college football quarterback for the Iowa Hawkeyes.

== Early life ==
Bessinger attended and played football for Davis High School in Kaysville, Utah. He was a three-year starting quarterback for the Darts and committed to Boise State in May 2025. As a junior, he led the Darts to 8 wins while passing for 3,674 yards, 46 total touchdowns and just five interceptions. On October 27, 2025, Bessinger decommitted from Boise State. During his senior season, he completed 76 percent of his passes while amassing 4,313 passing yards and 53 touchdowns. He also broke the state record for most completions in a season with 333.

Over the course of his high school career, he was named the Utah Player of the Year in 2025, the ALL-USA West Football Team offensive captain in 2025, first-team all-state in 2024, and an honorable mention all-state selection in 2023.

On November 8, 2025 Bessinger committed to Iowa and signed with the team on December 3.

College recruiting
Name	Hometown	School	Height	Weight	Commit date
Tradon Bessinger; QB	Kaysville, Utah	Davis	6 ft 4 in (1.93 m)	210 lb (95 kg)	Nov 8, 2023
Tradon Bessinger; QB	Recruit ratings: Rivals: 247Sports: ESPN: (81)				

== Personal life ==
Bessinger is the son of Chad and Tenaya Bessinger. He has two siblings, an older brother and a younger sister.
