= Henry Blood =

Henry Blood may refer to:

- Henry Ames Blood (1836–1892), American historian
- Henry H. Blood (1872–1942), 7th Governor of Utah, USA
