= Timothy Hawkes (politician) =

American politician

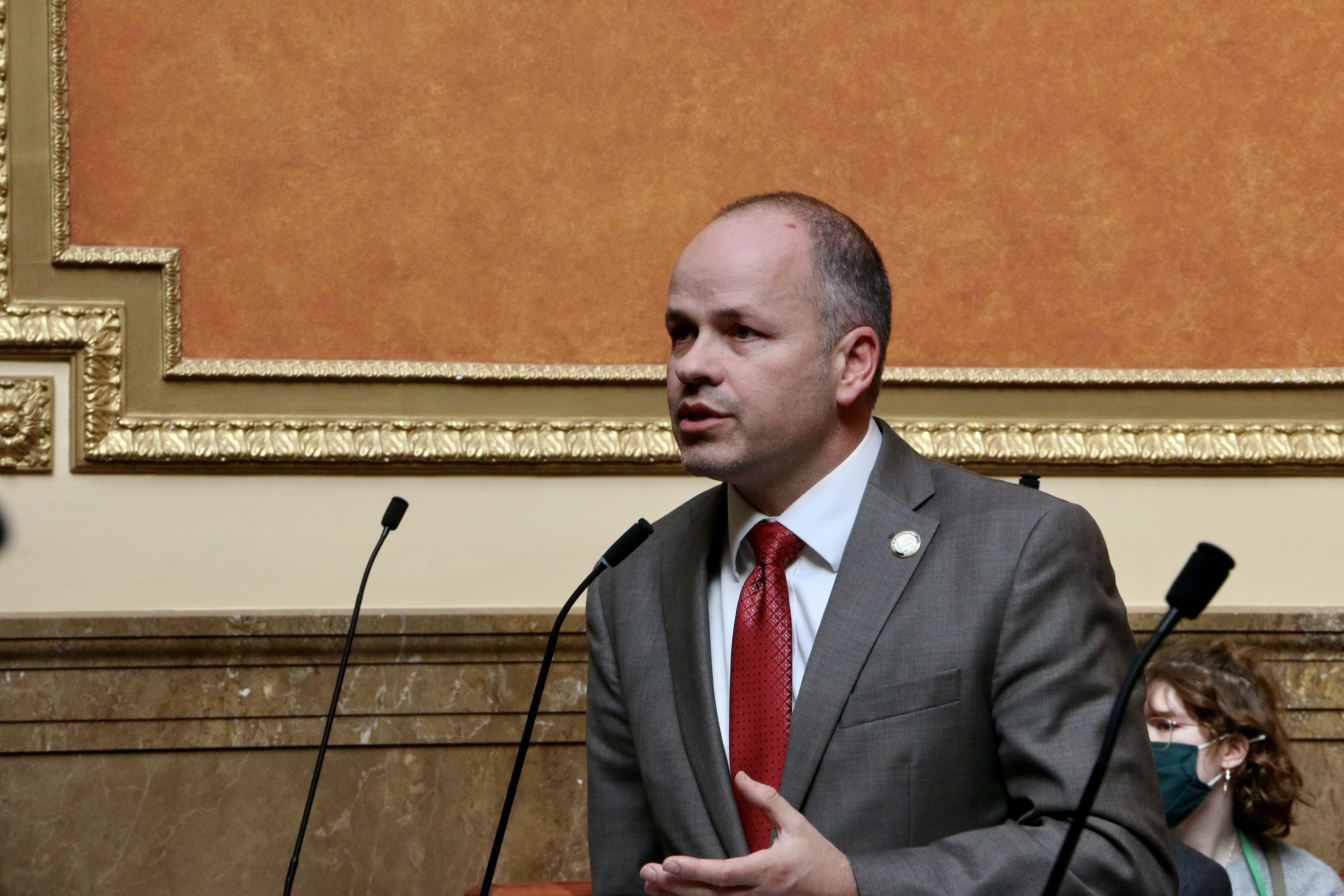

Member of the Utah House of Representatives from the 18th district
- In office January 1, 2015 – December 31, 2022
- Preceded by: Roger E. Barrus
- Succeeded by: Paul Cutler

Personal details
- Party: Republican
- Spouse: Rebecca
- Children: 4
- Education: Brigham Young University (BA); Columbia University (JD)

Timothy D. Hawkes is an American attorney, lobbyist and politician who served as a member of the Utah House of Representatives from the 18th district. Elected in November 2014, he assumed office on January 1, 2015.

== Education ==
Hawkes earned a Bachelor of Arts degree in political science from Brigham Young University and a Juris Doctor from Columbia Law School.

== Career ==
Hawkes works as a public interest lawyer. He also works as the state director for Trout Unlimited. He was first elected to the Utah House of Representatives in 2014 and began serving on January 1, 2015.

Currently his legislative career, Hawkes serves as the House Rules Chair. He serves on the House Natural Resources, Agriculture, and Environment Committee, House Business and Labor Committee, House Rules Committee, Natural Resources, and the Agriculture, and Environmental Quality Appropriations Subcommittee. Since 2019, Hawkes has served as chair of the House Rules Committee.

He has expressed concern about the potential for the Great Salt Lake to dry up, comparing the effect to California's Owens Lake.

=== Current legislation ===
2022 legislation
Bill	Status
HB0129 Navigable Water Determinations	sent to House filing for bills not passed 3/4/22
HB0157 Sovereign Lands Revenue Amendments	signed by the Governor 3/21/22
HB0245 Occupational Safety and Health Amendments	signed by the Governor 3/24/22
HB0333 Economic and Workforce Development Amendments	signed by the Governor 3/24/22
HB0334 State Engineer Modifications	signed by the Governor 3/21/22
HB0350 State Historic Preservation Office Amendments	signed by the Governor 3/24/22
HCR017 Concurrent Resolution Supporting Utah's Economic and Cultural Relationship with Taiwan	signed by the Governor 3/24/22
HJR014 Joint Rules Resolution - Legislative Procedure Revisions	sent to Lieutenant Governor's office for filing 3/15/22
HJR016 Joint Resolution Approving Exchange of School and Institutional Trust Lands	sent to House filing for bills not passed 3/4/22

In 2022, Hawkes announced that he would be retiring from the legislature after his fourth consecutive term.

== Personal life ==
Hawkes lives in Centerville, Utah with his wife, Rebecca, and their four children.
