= Woods Cross High School =

Coordinates: 40.8683°N 111.8951°W

- 600 West 2200 South; Woods Cross, Utah 84087; United States

Information
- Type: Public high school
- Motto: Everybody is Somebody
- School district: Davis School District
- Principal: Deanne Kapetanov
- Staff: 66.80 (FTE)
- Grades: 10–12
- Enrollment: 1,613 (2023–2024)
- Student to teacher ratio: 24.15
- Color
- Mascot: Wildcat
- Feeder schools: Millcreek Junior High, Mueller Park Junior High, South Davis Junior High, Legacy Preparatory Academy
- Website: WXHS Website

Woods Cross High School is a public high school (serving grades 10–12) in Woods Cross, Utah, in the Davis School District. It is sometimes abbreviated as WXHS. As of the 2024–25 school year, the principal is Deanne Kapetanov. 1,485 students were enrolled at that time.

== Sports ==
Woods Cross High School students have the option to participate in many sports, such as baseball, basketball, cross country, drill team, football, golf, soccer, softball, swimming, tennis, track and field, volleyball, and wrestling. They have one big game every year for each sport with their cross town rival, Bountiful High School.

== CTE ==
Woods Cross High School participates in the Career and Technical Education program. CTE provides technical training to prepare for a successful career. Classes begin in seventh grade and continue until a student's senior year in high school. Throughout the course of the program, students can choose different courses, depending on where their interests lie. These courses include Agriculture, Business, Marketing, Family and Consumer Science, Health Science, Information Technology, Skilled and Technical Sciences, and Technology and Engineering.

== Arts ==
Woods Cross Students excel in many music programs throughout the school. The band, choir, orchestra, and drama programs have received numerous state and national awards at competitions in and out of the state. Visual art students can choose from a wide variety of courses from in ceramics, painting, sculpting, jewelry making, and graphic arts.

== Notable alumni ==
- Matthew Davis (Class of 1996) - Actor known for his roles in Legally Blonde, Blue Crush, and The Vampire Diaries
- Holly Rowe (Class of 1984) - Sportscaster for ESPN and AT&T SportsNet Rocky Mountain
