= Clinton, Utah =

City in Utah, United States

- City
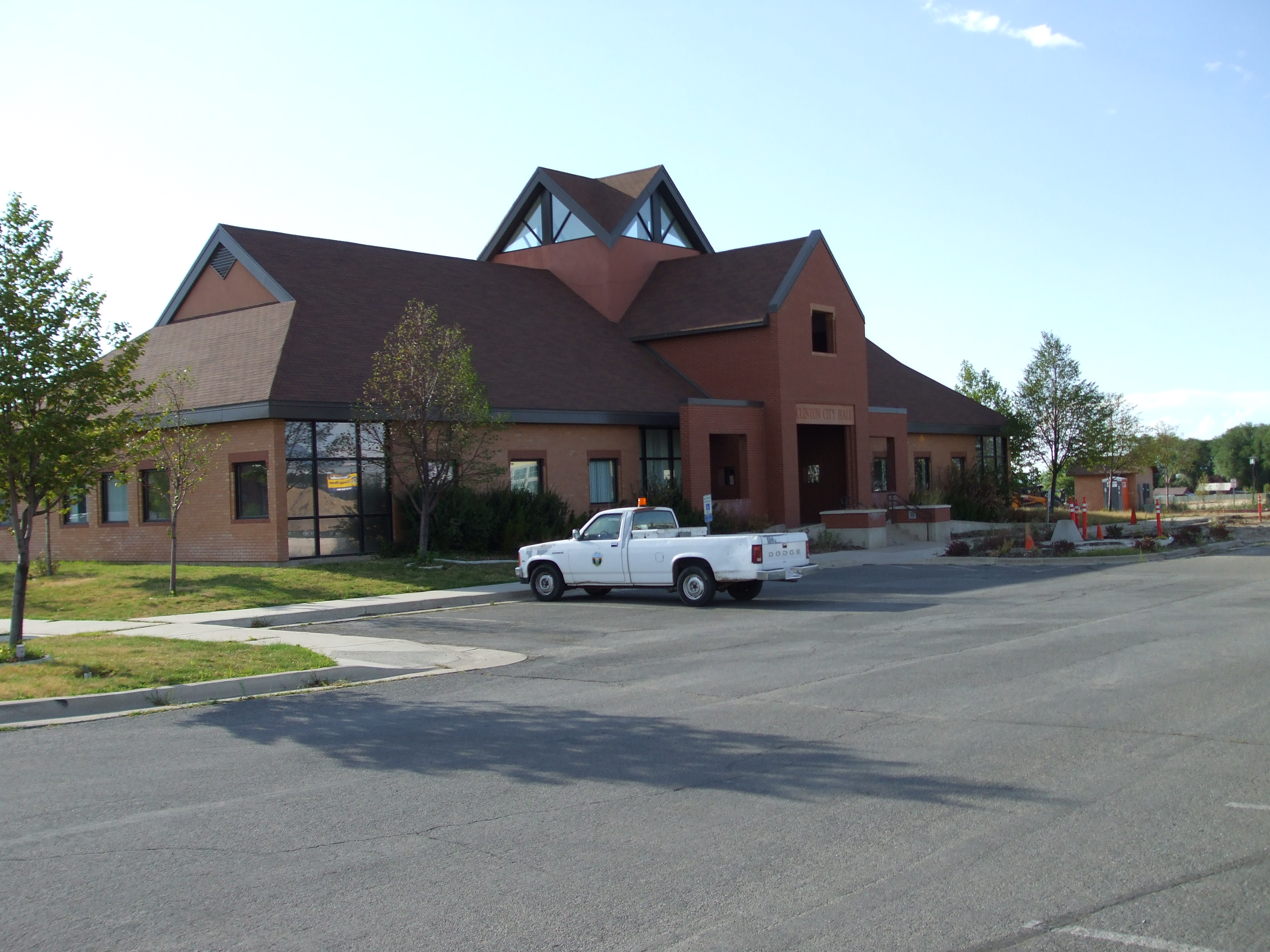
- Former Clinton City Hall

- Location in Davis County and the state of Utah
- Coordinates: 41°07′52″N 112°03′34″W
- Country: United States
- State: Utah
- County: Davis
- Incorporated: 1896

Area
  - Total: 5.93 sq mi (15.37 km^{2})
  - Land: 5.93 sq mi (15.36 km^{2})
  - Water: 0 sq mi (0.00 km^{2})
- Elevation: 4,334 ft (1,321 m)

Population (2020)
  - Total: 23,386
  - Estimate (2021): 23,597
  - Density: 3,938.9/sq mi (1,520.83/km^{2})
- Time zone: UTC-7 (Mountain (MST))
  - Summer (DST): UTC-6 (MDT)
- Postal code: 84015
- Area codes: 385, 801
- FIPS code: 49-14290
- GNIS feature ID: 2409486
- Website: www.clinton.utah.gov

Clinton is a city in Davis County, Utah, United States. It is part of the Ogden–Clearfield, Utah Metropolitan Statistical Area. The population was 23,386 at the 2020 United States census, up from 20,426 in 2010 census. Clinton started off as a sleepy farm town and grew rapidly during the 1990s and continues to experience rapid growth, with an estimated population of 23,597 in 2021.

== Geography ==
Clinton is located in northern Davis County, bordered by Sunset to the east, Clearfield to the southeast, and West Point to the southwest. The northern border of Clinton is the Weber County line, with the city of Hooper to the northwest and Roy to the north and northeast. According to the United States Census Bureau, Clinton has a total area of 5.8 square miles (15.1 km^{2}), all land.

== History ==
The area, then part of Layton, was settled in the 1870s by James Hill and his family. Early settlers used it to graze their animals but, even though the land was fertile, culinary water had to be hauled in from the Weber River. The area was commonly called The Range, Sand Ridge, The Basin and The Summit. Dry farming began in the area of Clinton in 1879. By 1881 there was a railroad station. In 1884 the Summit Basin Branch of the Church of Jesus Christ of Latter-day Saints was organized in Clinton.

The first school was built in 1885 just south of the cemetery. The first ward in Clinton was organized on May 29, 1897. It was called The Clinton Ward.

Clinton would not become an official town until 1936, and its growth was relatively small until the 1960s. In 1950, the total population of Clinton City was only 670, and it would be 19 years before the city even established its own police department.

== Demographics ==
Historical population
Census	Pop.	Note	%±
1900	247		—
1910	611		147.4%
1920	846		38.5%
1930	795		−6.0%
1940	581		−26.9%
1950	670		15.3%
1960	1,025		53.0%
1970	1,768		72.5%
1980	5,777		226.8%
1990	7,945		37.5%
2000	12,585		58.4%
2010	20,426		62.3%
2020	23,386		14.5%
U.S. Decennial Census

The median income for a household in the city was $90,397 and a per capita income of $29,934. About 2.9% of the population were below the poverty line.

=== 2020 census ===
As of the 2020 census, Clinton had a population of 23,386. The median age was 30.7 years, with 33.4% of residents under the age of 18 and 8.9% of residents 65 years of age or older. For every 100 females there were 103.9 males, and for every 100 females age 18 and over there were 100.3 males age 18 and over.

100.0% of residents lived in urban areas, while 0.0% lived in rural areas.

There were 6,801 households in Clinton, of which 50.8% had children under the age of 18 living in them. Of all households, 69.7% were married-couple households, 11.6% were households with a male householder and no spouse or partner present, and 14.8% were households with a female householder and no spouse or partner present. About 12.1% of all households were made up of individuals and 4.9% had someone living alone who was 65 years of age or older.

There were 6,930 housing units, of which 1.9% were vacant. The homeowner vacancy rate was 0.7% and the rental vacancy rate was 3.9%.

Racial composition as of the 2020 census
Race	Number	Percent
White	19,009	81.3%
Black or African American	292	1.2%
American Indian and Alaska Native	211	0.9%
Asian	532	2.3%
Native Hawaiian and Other Pacific Islander	184	0.8%
Some other race	1,126	4.8%
Two or more races	2,032	8.7%
Hispanic or Latino (of any race)	3,180	13.6%

=== 2010 census ===
Based on 2010 census data, the population was spread out, with 33.6% under 18, 11.7% from 18 to 24, 31.8% from 25 to 44, 14.8% from 45 to 64, and 4.0% who were 65 years of age or older. The median age was 25 years. For every 100 females, there were 101.9 males. For every 100 females aged 18 and over, there were 99.3 males.

== See also ==
- List of cities and towns in Utah
