= Bountiful High School =

Public high school in Utah, United States

Location
- 695 S. Orchard Dr. Bountiful, Utah 84010; United States

Information
- Type: Public High School
- Established: 1951
- School district: Davis School District
- Principal: Travis M. Warnick
- Teaching staff: 60.16 (FTE)
- Grades: 10-12
- Enrollment: 1,526 (2023–2024)
- Student to teacher ratio: 25.37
- Colors: Red and gray
- Athletics: Baseball, Basketball, Cross-country, Football, Golf, Soccer, Softball, Swimming, Tennis, Track, Volleyball, Wrestling
- Mascot: Redhawks
- Nickname: BHS
- Website: Bountiful High School website

Bountiful High School is a public high school in Bountiful, Utah, United States, for grades 10 to 12. The school is one of eleven high schools in the Davis School District.

== History ==
Bountiful High opened in 1951. It underwent reconstruction in 2013, and a new cafeteria and commons were built in place of an outdoor courtyard as well as the addition of air conditioning. Other remodels include new hallways, entrance, foyer, and bathrooms. A renovation of the parking lot was finished in 2015.

=== Mascot controversy ===
From its opening in 1951 to the end of the 2020–2021 school year, Bountiful High's mascot was the Braves. In July 2020, a petition circulated asking the Davis School District to retire the mascot. A separate petition to keep the mascot was started by an alum from Salt Lake City. School district spokesperson Christopher Williams announced on July 13 that principal Aaron Hogge indicated that the practice of having students at athletic events dressed up in Native American costumes would be discontinued. The controversy is part of a larger national issue about the use of Native Americans as mascots since the 1970s. After months of deliberation and conversations between community members and the school and district administration, it was announced on November 30, 2020, that the Brave mascot would be retired. The community was allowed to vote for a replacement mascot from a list of potential new mascots compiled by the school. In April 2021, the school officially changed its name to "The Redhawks."

== Academics ==
In 2024, the school had a 96% graduation rate and a total enrollment of 1,489 students. Bountiful High offers concurrent enrollment courses through Weber State University, Salt Lake Community College and Utah State University, through which students may receive college credit. Bountiful High also offers Advanced Placement (AP) credit, as well as International Baccalaureate courses whose participants can earn an IB Diploma at the end of their senior year of high school.

== Sports ==
BHS competes in 5A sports including soccer, basketball, baseball, wrestling, volleyball, cross country, track and field, Mountain biking, golf, tennis, swimming, lacrosse, and football. They share a rivalry with the Woods Cross High School Wildcats and the Viewmont Vikings, most notably being the rivalry between the Woods Cross High School Wildcats.

The Redhawks have a rich history in the student section supporting the athletics. The section is commonly referred to as the BASS. The BASS has been featured on many television programs and social media outlets.

The Redhawks won back-to-back state football championships in 2002 and 2003, and most recently won the Utah 5A state championship in 2024. They have also won three state baseball championships in 1981, 1988 and 2014. The boys' baseball team has generated many top players in the state, including back-to-back state MVPs Mark Shaffer (1991) and Brad Beck (1992). Its later 90s teams are said to have been some of its best led by all-state players such as Mike Miller, Zac Jacobs, Matt Shaffer and Nate Weese, who was drafted by the then Montreal Expos in 2002.

The boys' soccer team has won a total of eight state championships, most recently in 2007, 2008, and 2013.

The boys' basketball program at this school has historically been quite notable. Led by longtime coach Mike Maxwell, the Redhawks won the 1969, 1982, 1997, 2014, and 2015 4A state basketball title. Maxwell, who has been called a cheater for violating district rules against recruiting players from outside school boundaries brought probation and fines to the school after a UHSAA investigation showed he violated the rules. Maxwell's practice of inappropriate recruiting continued into the 2019–2020 season in which three of the five starters were from outside the school boundaries.

The girls' basketball team won the 4A state championship for the 2015–2016 season, only having three losses. They also have three consecutive 5A state championships for the 2022–2023, 2023-2024 and 2024–2025 seasons.

Bountiful won the girls' soccer state championship in 2000, 2003, 2006, and 2025.

The girls' tennis team won the state championship in 2003 and 2004.

The Mandonelles (drill team) have won first place at their region for 10 years in a row since 2008 and have won first place state competition in the years 2009, 2010, 2011, 2012, 2013, 2014, 2015, 2017, and 2018. Their "seven-peat" streak was broken in 2016 with Bountiful placing third overall in the state competition. In 2025, the Mandonelles snapped a five-year state title drought and captured the 5A state championship.

== Notable alumni ==
- Amy Bender (Class of 1983) - sports reporter and producer for the Utah Jazz Radio Network
- Dave Checketts (Class of 1973) - former Sports franchise owner of Utah Jazz, New York Knicks, New York Rangers, and St. Louis Blues
- Brady Christensen - NFL offensive lineman for the Carolina Panthers
- Jake Gibb - Olympic volleyball player
- Sam Merrill - NBA player for the Cleveland Cavaliers
- Aaron Roderick - college football coach (BYU)
- Faletau Satuala - college football safety for the BYU Cougars
- Max Tooley - NFL linebacker for the Houston Texans
