= Viewmont High School =

Public high school in Utah, United States

Location
- 120 West 1000 North; Bountiful, Utah 84010; 40°54′N 111°53′W

Information
- Type: Public
- Motto: A Tradition of Excellence
- Founded: 1964
- School district: Davis School District
- Principal: Travis Lund
- Teaching staff: 61.76 (FTE)
- Grades: 10–12
- Enrollment: 1,568 (2024–2025)
- Student to teacher ratio: 25.39
- Colors: Cardinal and gold
- Mascot: Viking
- Website: vhs.davis.k12.ut.us

Viewmont High School is a public high school located in Bountiful, Utah. The school is a member of the Davis School District. The principal, as of 2024, is Travis Lund.

In 2011, VHS was identified by Newsweek magazine and The Washington Post as being in the top 5% of all public high schools in the United States. Viewmont students average 23.44 on the ACT. In addition, Viewmont graduates 96% of its seniors, with over 40% earning college credit through Advanced Placement and Concurrent Enrollment classes. In 2019 5,300 CE Credits were earned by the junior and senior classes. In 2020, the senior class generated approximately $10.7 million in scholarship offers. Viewmont also offers a full range of artistic, athletic, and career and technical programs. Over the years there have been 41 state titles and 219 regional titles.

== School information ==
=== Sports ===
Viewmont High School offers many sports, such as lacrosse, soccer, basketball, baseball, wrestling, volleyball, cross country, track and field, golf, tennis, swimming and American football.

The Viewmont Drill Team has won the state title in 2022 and 2023.

The Viewmont Softball team earned the state title in 2003.

Viewmont has won the state title in wrestling in seven out of the last ten years.

The Viewmont men's tennis team has won three state titles in recent years.

The Viewmont men's and women's swimming teams have won two state titles each in recent years. Swimmer Drew Bonner set the state record on February 12, 2016, in 500-yard Freestyle at 4:32.53.

Viewmont is a 5A school, along with nearby schools such as Bountiful and Woods Cross.

The Viewmont Hockey team have State wins in 1977, 1978, 2014, 2016, 2018, 2019.

The Viewmont women's cross country won the 5A state title in 2026.

=== Bookstore ===
The Viewmont Bookstore is a student run store open every day at lunch. They sell a variety of food items, such as Frazil frozen drinks, Tacotime Burritos, Chick-fil-A, Dominos Pizza, and Joy Luck. They also sell a variety of Viewmont apparel.

=== Danegeld ===
The Danegeld, the Viewmont school newspaper, is written and published by students several times a year. The newspaper has been in print since 1964, and in 1968 its name was changed from The Big V to the Danegeld. The Danegeld staff has also created an online blog that allows students to openly discuss articles.

=== Vikings Give ===
For years, Viewmont held a fundraiser to support students in Salt Lake City who attend Guadalupe Elementary School. The monetary amount differed from year to year, but consistently reached upwards of $25,000 in its final years 4–5 years. The money was used to buy Christmas presents that the children would otherwise not receive. Other local charities were also given part of the students' fundraising efforts. Students who wished to attend the trip to Guadalupe must participate in fundraising activities and help shop for the children's wish lists. In 2016, the Guadalupe was replaced with a new program called Viking Gives. In the most recent years of establishing the new program of “Vikings Give”, Viewmont has been able to earn upwards of $80,000.

=== VHS Marching Band ===
The VHS Marching Band competes in local marching band competitions in the 4A class. They also march in a number of local parades. They took third in 2A in 2015 at the state championship in Red Rocks, St. George. In several other competitions that year, they placed third.

=== Pathways, advisory and SRC ===
For the 2007–2008 school year, each student at Viewmont was placed into one of five pathways: Arts, Business, Humanities, Science, or Technology. The pathways "allow students to develop their interests and specialize as much as they would like". Students go to an advisory class twice a month based on their grade and pathway. SRC (Study Hall–Remediation–Collaboration) is a mandatory study hall for students that failed one or more classes the previous term. SRC is also mandatory for all sophomores during the first term of each school year, or for any age student who desires to receive help in any particular subject. It is held during the first part of lunch every school day except Fridays. In addition, Viewmont has "Link Crew", a new sophomore transition program, which matches incoming students with a group of upperclassmen to help connect and educate and facilitate inclusion for all new students.

=== Notable historical incidents ===
On the night of November 8, 1974, Viewmont High School was the site of serial killer Ted Bundy's abduction of 17-year-old Viewmont High School student Debra Kent. That night, Viewmont High School Drama club was presenting the play The Redhead. During the play, Bundy was seen repeatedly inside Viewmont High School auditorium, asking students as well as the Viewmont dance teacher to go outside with him. At one point Bundy was sitting watching the play behind the Kent family, and at another point pretending to be a theater usher, both before and after Kent was abducted in the school parking lot and presumably locked in Bundy's car parked there. Bundy later confessed that he did not finally kill Kent at Viewmont High School, but abducted her to his apartment where he later killed her. Another Viewmont High School student, 15-year-old Susan Curtis, who also attended the school play that night, was abducted and killed by Bundy on June 27, 1975.

== Notable alumni ==
- Dave Downs, former Major League Baseball pitcher for the Philadelphia Phillies
- Kelly Downs, former Major League Baseball pitcher for the San Francisco Giants. Known for being on the October 1989 cover of Sports Illustrated magazine.
- Greg Clark, former National Football League tight end for the San Francisco 49ers
- Alex Jensen, professional basketball coach and former professional basketball player
- Ben McAdams, former member of the U.S. House of Representatives
- Kyle Morrell, former BYU football DB; member of 1984 national champion; AP first-team All-American; former National Football League DB for the Minnesota Vikings
