= Bissinger =

Bissinger is a surname. Notable people with the surname include:

- Buzz Bissinger (born 1954), American journalist and author
- Florian Bissinger (born 1988), German cyclist
- John Bissinger (1879–1941), American gymnast and athlete
- Karl Bissinger (1914–2008), American photographer
