= Woods Cross, Utah =

City in Utah, United States

- City
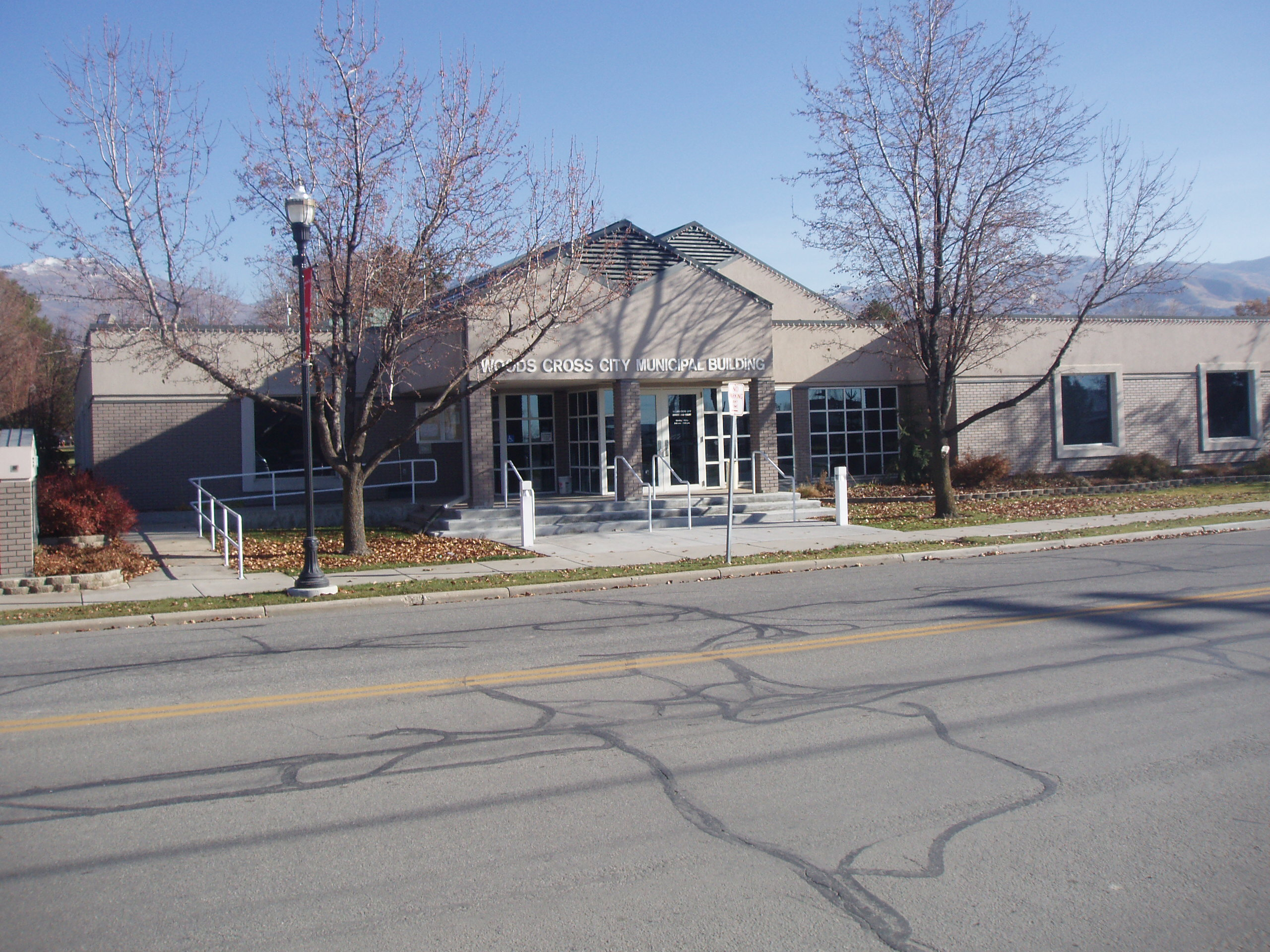
- Woods Cross City Municipal Building

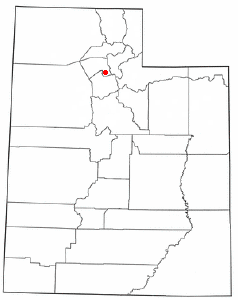
- Location of Woods Cross, Utah
- Coordinates: 40°52′36″N 111°54′58″W
- Country: United States
- State: Utah
- County: Davis
- Settled: 1865
- Incorporated: 1935
- Named for: Daniel C. Wood

Area
  - Total: 3.84 sq mi (9.94 km^{2})
  - Land: 3.83 sq mi (9.91 km^{2})
  - Water: 0.0077 sq mi (0.02 km^{2})
- Elevation: 4,249 ft (1,295 m)

Population (2020)
  - Total: 11,410
  - Density: 2,986.7/sq mi (1,153.18/km^{2})
- Time zone: UTC-7 (Mountain (MST))
  - Summer (DST): UTC-6 (MDT)
- ZIP codes: 84010, 84087
- Area codes: 385, 801
- FIPS code: 49-85370
- GNIS feature ID: 2412304
- Website: www.woodscross.gov

Woods Cross is a city in Davis County, Utah, United States. It is part of the Ogden–Clearfield, Utah Metropolitan Statistical Area. The population was 11,410 at the 2020 census.

== History ==
=== Daniel Wood ===
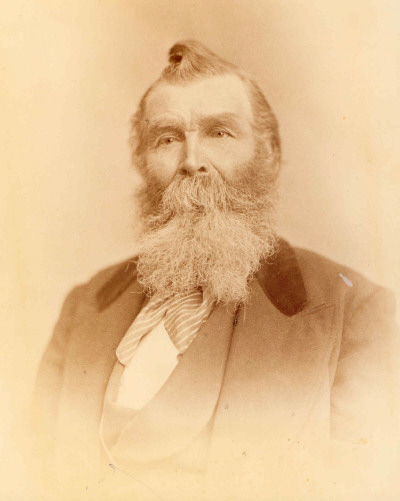
Photo of Daniel Wood

Woods Cross is named after Daniel Wood, an early settler in the Utah Territory. Wood (October 16, 1800 - April 15, 1892) was a Mormon pioneer and a settler of the western United States. He was the son of Henry Wood and Elizabeth Demelt. He was born in Dutchess County, New York and died in Woods Cross.

== Geography and climate ==
Woods Cross is located in southeastern Davis County, bordered to the north by West Bountiful, to the east by Bountiful, and to the south by the city of North Salt Lake. The city lies along the Wasatch Front next to the Wasatch Mountain Range. Water is supplied by mountain springs and snowpack running off of the Wasatch Mountains. The climate varies greatly throughout the year, with very hot summers and mildly cold winters, with very pleasant spring and fall seasons separating the two. Precipitation is mainly accumulated in the winter and spring, but there is not enough to sustain any aquifers. According to the United States Census Bureau, Woods Cross has a total area of 3.9 square miles (10.0 km^{2}), all land.

== Demographics ==
Historical population
Census	Pop.	Note	%±
1940	211		—
1950	273		29.4%
1960	1,098		302.2%
1970	3,124		184.5%
1980	4,263		36.5%
1990	5,384		26.3%
2000	6,419		19.2%
2010	9,761		52.1%
2020	11,410		16.9%
U.S. Decennial Census

=== 2020 census ===
As of the 2020 census, Woods Cross had a population of 11,410. The median age was 30.5 years. 34.0% of residents were under the age of 18 and 7.4% of residents were 65 years of age or older. For every 100 females there were 101.0 males, and for every 100 females age 18 and over there were 96.4 males age 18 and over.

100.0% of residents lived in urban areas, while 0.0% lived in rural areas.

There were 3,468 households in Woods Cross, of which 49.1% had children under the age of 18 living in them. Of all households, 63.4% were married-couple households, 12.9% were households with a male householder and no spouse or partner present, and 18.2% were households with a female householder and no spouse or partner present. About 14.6% of all households were made up of individuals and 4.5% had someone living alone who was 65 years of age or older.

There were 3,552 housing units, of which 2.4% were vacant. The homeowner vacancy rate was 0.5% and the rental vacancy rate was 4.0%.

Racial composition as of the 2020 census
Race	Number	Percent
White	9,253	81.1%
Black or African American	106	0.9%
American Indian and Alaska Native	108	0.9%
Asian	222	1.9%
Native Hawaiian and Other Pacific Islander	284	2.5%
Some other race	482	4.2%
Two or more races	955	8.4%
Hispanic or Latino (of any race)	1,221	10.7%

== Education ==
Woods Cross is part of Davis School District. The city has one high school, Woods Cross High School, and two elementary schools, Odyssey Elementary and Woods Cross Elementary.
