= Clearfield High School =

Public high school in Clearfield, Utah, US

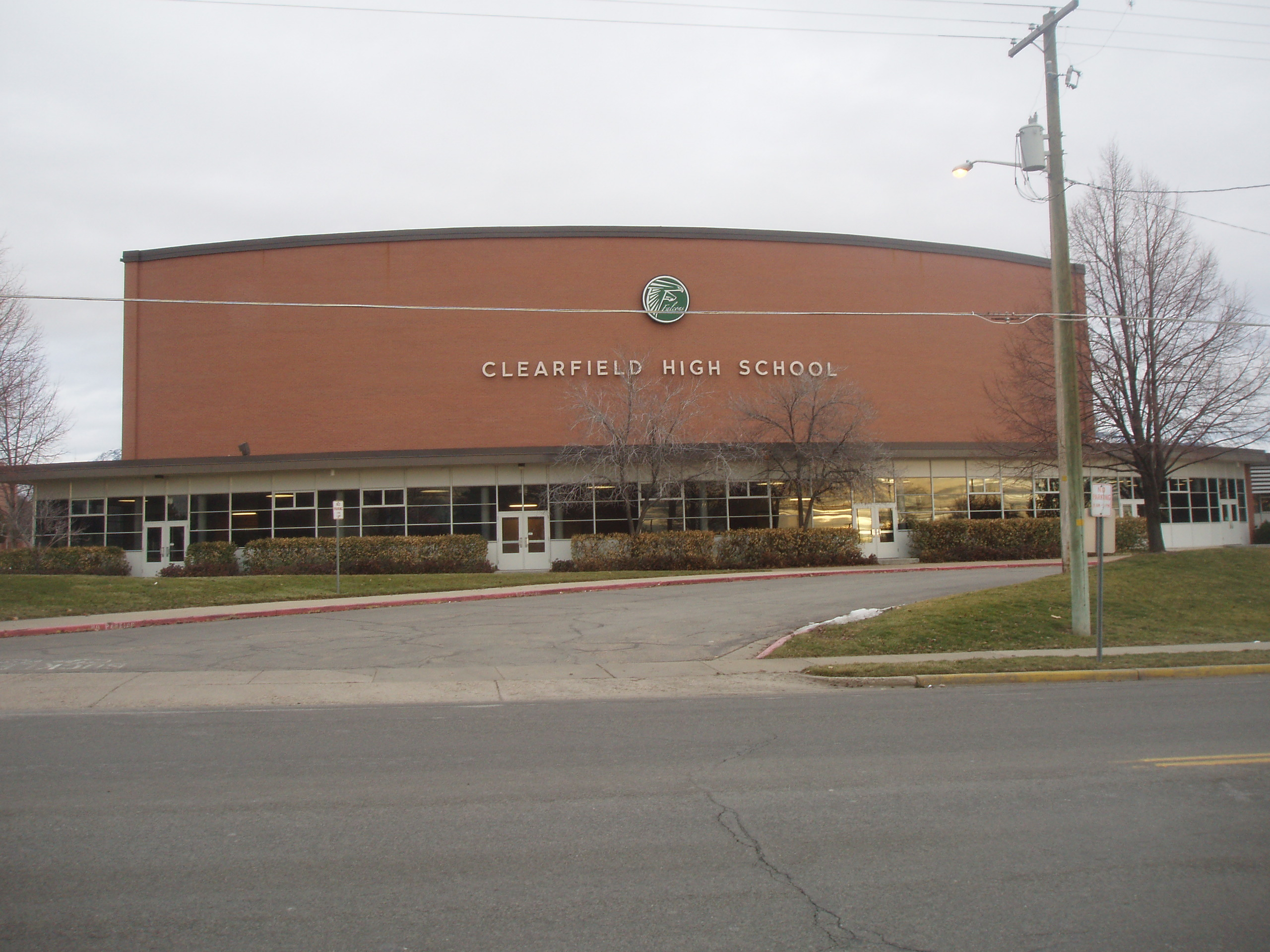
- View of auditorium from the west

Location
- 931 S. 1000 E. Clearfield, Utah 84015; 41°06′00″N 112°00′19″W

Information
- Type: Public, Senior High School
- Principal: TJ Barker
- Teaching staff: 80.65 (FTE)
- Grades: 10-12
- Enrollment: 2,058 (2023–2024)
- Student to teacher ratio: 25.52
- Color
- Mascot: Falcon
- Website: chs.davis.k12.ut.us

Clearfield High School is a secondary school in Clearfield, Utah, United States. It is part of the Davis School District. The school's mascot is the peregrine falcon, and its colors are green and white with an accent of gold. In 1960-61 students opened the doors of the new Clearfield High School, with the first class graduating in spring 1963. The current principal is TJ Barker.

== Athletics ==
Clearfield High participates in many sports. It has teams that compete in baseball, basketball, cross-country, football, golf, soccer, softball, swimming, track, tennis, volleyball, debate, and wrestling.

== Notable alumni ==
- Andre Dyson, defensive back (NFL)
- Kevin Dyson, wide receiver (NFL)
- Ken Gardner, retired professional basketball player
- Brandon Mitchell, member of the Idaho House of Representatives
- Dallon Weekes, former member of Panic! at the Disco and frontman of the music duo I Dont Know How but They Found Me.
