= Enterprise, Morgan County, Utah =

Enterprise
- CDP
- Location in Morgan County and the state of Utah
- Coordinates: 41°06′25″N 111°43′51″W
- Country: United States
- State: Utah
- County: Morgan
- Settled: 1861
- Founder: Henry and Stephen Hales

Area
  - Total: 3.8 sq mi (9.8 km^{2})
  - Land: 3.8 sq mi (9.8 km^{2})
  - Water: 0.0 sq mi (0 km^{2})
- Elevation: 5,246 ft (1,599 m)

Population (2020)
  - Total: 575
  - Density: 150/sq mi (58/km^{2})
- Time zone: UTC-7 (Mountain (MST))
  - Summer (DST): UTC-6 (MDT)
- ZIP code: 84050
- Area codes: 385, 801
- GNIS feature ID: 2584766

Enterprise is a census-designated place (CDP) in northwestern Morgan County, Utah, United States. The population was 575 at the 2020 census.

== Geography ==
Enterprise is located in the western part of Morgan Valley, along Interstate 84. Peterson is just to the west, across I-84 and the Weber River. Mountain Green is about 4 miles (6.4 km) to the northwest, and Morgan, the county seat, is some 6 miles (9.7 km) southeast. Most of the homes in Enterprise are clustered along the main street, Old Highway Road (part of the former Highway 30), which roughly parallels I-84 to the north on the benchland between Morgan and Mountain Green. The community's northern boundary is the crescent of foothills from Dry Hollow on the north to Roswell Canyon on the south. According to the United States Census Bureau, the CDP has a total area of 3.8 square miles (9.8 km^{2}), all land.

== History ==
The first settlers in Enterprise were Henry and Stephen Hales, who arrived in 1861. They found fertile land on the bench, but little water for irrigation. They dug a 2-mile (3.2 km) ditch from the Weber River to water their farmland. A canal company was organized in 1863 to irrigate the whole area, but Enterprise was short on water for many years as thieves diverted water upstream. The first schoolhouse was built in 1863. A townsite with official blocks was surveyed and laid out in 1865. A sawmill operated in Roswell Canyon in the 1870s. Although it was not an official census precinct, the 1880 census enumerated 81 residents in Enterprise.

== Demographics ==
Historical population
Census	Pop.	Note	%±
2010	605		—
2020	575		−5.0%

As of the census of 2010, there were 605 people, 147 households, and 133 families residing in the CDP. There were 155 housing units, of which 147 were occupied. The racial makeup of the population was 96.2% White, 0.5% Black or African American, 1.3% American Indian and Alaska Native, 0.3% Asian, 0.2% Native Hawaiian and Other Pacific Islander, 0.2% from some other race, and 1.3% from two or more races. Hispanic or Latino of any race were 4.0% of the population.

There were 147 households, out of which 62.6% had children under the age of 18 living with them. 84.4% had married couples living together. 8.2% of all households were made up of individuals, and 6.8% had someone living alone who was 65 years of age or older. The average household size was 4.12, and the average family size was 4.38.

The population was 50.6% female, and the median age was 22.9 years.

== See also ==
- List of census-designated places in Utah
