= National Register of Historic Places listings in Morgan County, Utah =

Location of Morgan County in Utah

This is a list of the National Register of Historic Places listings in Morgan County, Utah.

This is intended to be a complete list of the properties and districts on the National Register of Historic Places in Morgan County, Utah, United States. Latitude and longitude coordinates are provided for many National Register properties and districts; these locations may be seen together in a map.

There are 7 properties and districts listed on the National Register in the county, and one former listing.

This National Park Service list is complete through NPS recent listings posted March 21, 2025.

== Current listings ==
	Name on the Register	Image	Date listed	Location	City or town	Description
1	Devil's Gate-Weber Hydroelectric Power Plant Historic District	Devil's Gate-Weber Hydroelectric Power Plant Historic District	April 20, 1989 (#89000276)	I-84 east of its junction with US-89, in Weber Canyon; 41°08′18″N 111°52′02″W	Uintah	
2	Daniel Heiner House	Daniel Heiner House	December 20, 1978 (#78002664)	543 N. 700 East; 41°03′03″N 111°40′36″W	Morgan	
3	Morgan High School Mechanical Arts Building	Morgan High School Mechanical Arts Building	April 9, 1986 (#86000738)	20 N. 100 East; 41°02′13″N 111°40′31″W	Morgan	
4	Morgan Historic District		April 29, 2022 (#100007519)	Roughly bounded by 700 East, 350 North, 400 West and 300 South; 41°02′10″N 111°40′39″W	Morgan	
5	Morgan Union Pacific Depot	Morgan Union Pacific Depot	October 20, 2011 (#11000757)	98 N. Commercial St. 41°02′28″N 111°39′58″W	Morgan	
6	Mormon Flat Breastworks	Mormon Flat Breastworks	October 27, 1988 (#88001943)	Along Jeremy Ranch Rd. at the mouth of Little Emigration Canyon; 40°48′55″N 111°35′15″W	Porterville	
7	South Round Valley School	South Round Valley School	April 27, 2011 (#11000233)	1925 E. Round Valley Rd. 41°02′35″N 111°37′51″W	Morgan vicinity	One-room schoolhouse.

== Former listings ==
	Name on the Register	Image	Date listed	Date removed	Location	City or town	Description
1	Morgan Elementary School	Morgan Elementary School	April 9, 1986 (#86000737)	March 26, 2018	75 N. 100 East; 41°02′17″N 111°40′20″W	Morgan	Demolished in August 1994

== See also ==
- List of National Historic Landmarks in Utah
- National Register of Historic Places listings in Utah
