= Porterville, Utah =

Unincorporated community in the state of Utah, United States

Porterville
- Unincorporated community
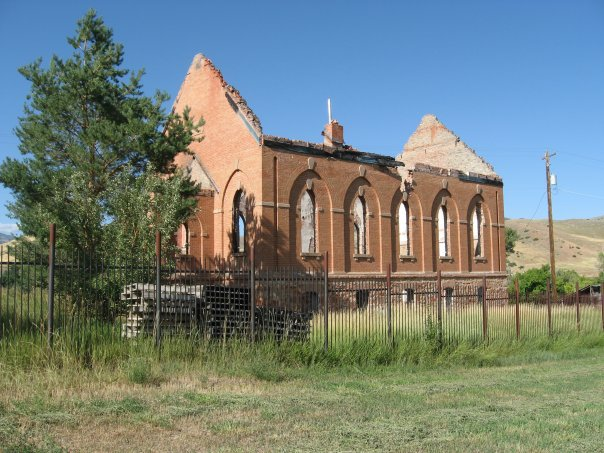
- Porterville Church in 2009

- Location within the state of Utah
- Coordinates: 40°58′53″N 111°40′42″W
- Country: United States
- State: Utah
- County: Morgan
- Settled: 1859
- Founded by: Sanford and Warriner Porter
- Elevation: 5,151 ft (1,570 m)
- Time zone: UTC-7 (Mountain (MST))
  - Summer (DST): UTC-6 (MDT)
- ZIP code: 84050
- Area code: 435
- GNIS feature ID: 1444594

Porterville is an unincorporated community in Morgan County, Utah, United States.

== Geography ==
Porterville is located at the south end of Morgan County, four miles southwest of Morgan. It is situated at a junction between Hardscrabble Canyon and East Canyon.

== History ==
Porterville was first settled by Centerville residents Sanford and Nancy Warriner Porter in 1859. The area had abundant timber, so they built a sawmill, the first in Morgan County. A town resident began teaching school out of her home in 1862, until a schoolhouse was built in 1867.

Western Shoshone, led by Chief Washakie, continued to hunt in the area and gather berries for several years after settlement began.

=== Porterville Church ===
The original church house was erected in 1898 and subsequently dedicated in 1908 by President Joseph F. Smith. Eventually, the costs of maintenance and needed repairs led the congregation to remodel the old schoolhouse and convert it for use as a church. Although the schoolhouse was sold to the ward in 1936, it was not until 1946 that regular meetings were held in the refinished space, mostly due to World War II. The church was sold to Marvin and Grace Kilbourn, who, despite efforts at preservation, were unable to prevent vandalism over the next several decades. In 1970, the Bergman family purchased the church and remodeled it into a home while keeping the exterior intact. In 1971, it was added to the Utah State Register of Historic Sites, which is now inactive. In the conversion to a private home, the steeple tower that was wood-framed with Gothic-arched frames on each side was removed. After being seen in Troll 2, filmed in the area in 1989, a fire in 2000 destroyed all but a shell of the original building. The Crawlers was also filmed in the area.

The Utah State Historical Society Classified Photo Collection contains a photograph of the "Porterville Meeting House" taken in 1920. Also, there is a LeConte Stewart painting of the church from 1948 titled "Country Funeral, Porterville" that was featured in an LDS Church History Museum exhibit called Landscape & Life: The Rural Setting of Latter-day Saints from 24 October 2003 to 18 April 2004.

== Mormon Flat Breastworks ==
- Mormon Flat Breastworks
- U.S. National Register of Historic Places
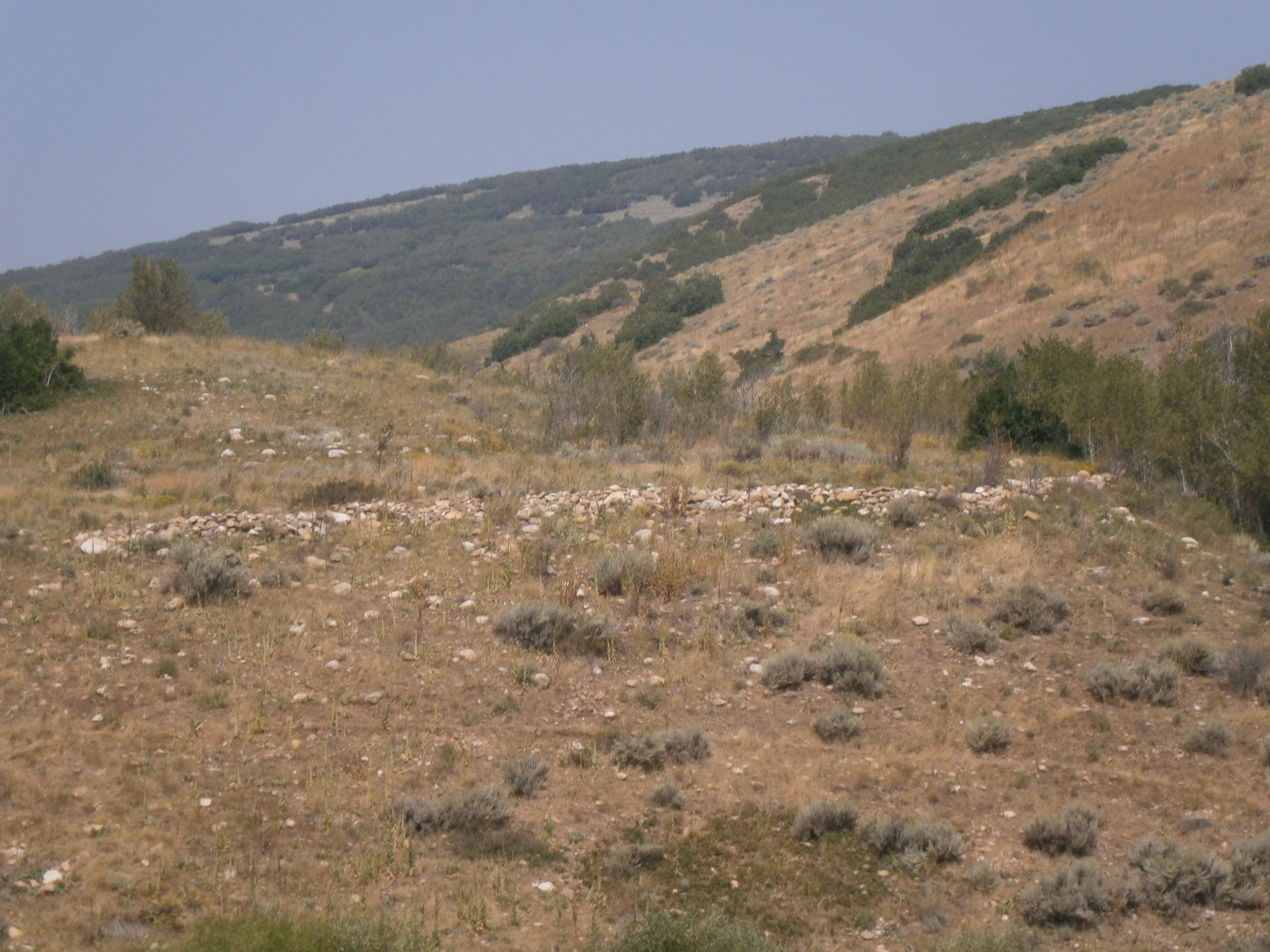
- Nearest city: Porterville
- Built: 1857
- Architectural style: Stone breastworks
- MPS: Utah War Fortifications MPS
- NRHP reference No.: 88001943
- Added to NRHP: October 27, 1988

The Mormon Flat Breastworks, fortification structures listed on the National Register of Historic Places, are located along the north side of Jeremy Ranch Road on both sides of the mouth of Little Emigration Canyon. They consist of horizontal rock breastworks built by Mormons in 1857 to defend against "Johnston's Army" in the Utah War. The walls were originally built about 4 feet (1.2 m) high, with trenches dug for riflemen.
