= Provo Canyon Guard Quarters =

- U.S. National Register of Historic Places
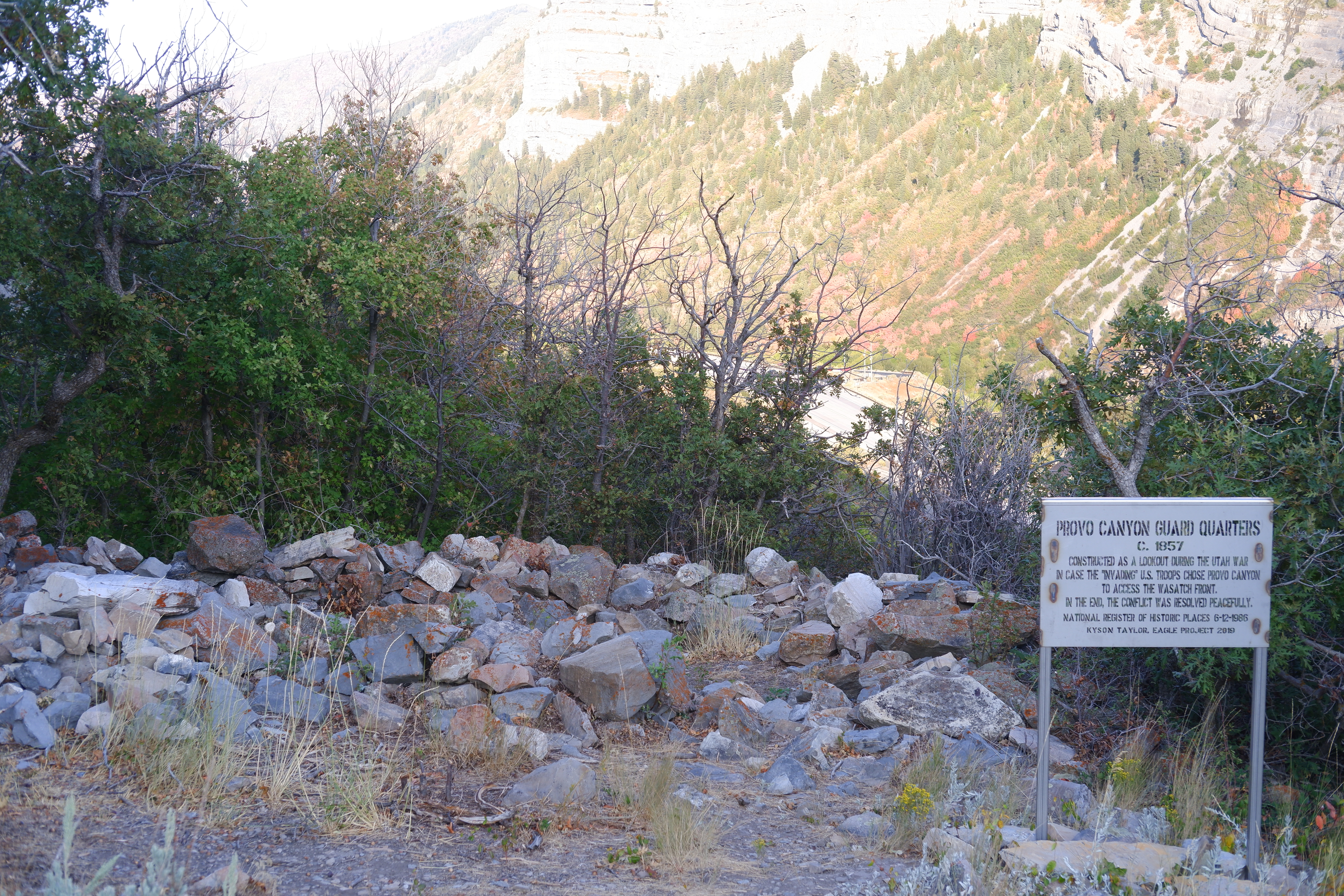
- Provo Canyon Guard Quarters, September 2020

- Location within Utah Location within the United States
- Location: U.S. Route 189; Provo Canyon, Utah; United States
- Coordinates: 40°20′23″N 111°36′44″W
- Area: 2 acres (0.81 ha)
- Built: 1857; 169 years ago
- NRHP reference No.: 86001291
- Added to NRHP: 1986

The Provo Canyon Guard Quarters is a historic building located in Provo Canyon in northeastern Utah County, Utah, United States, that is listed on the National Register of Historic Places (NRHP).

== Description ==
The Provo Canyon Guard Quarters is an important historical site, preserving the conflict held during the Utah War, a bloodless standoff between the federal government and The Church of Jesus Christ of Latter-day Saints which lasted from 1857 to 1858. These guard quarters were one of three fortifications built by the Church members in response to the threat they perceived from the federal government during the Utah War. The Provo Canyon Quarters, due to its location, was not likely to be involved in any battles and was assigned a mere ten men to keep up the defenses. After the Utah War this fortification served as a station to observe Native American activity until the end of the Black Hawk Indian War in 1868, after which the Guard Quarters have served little purpose.

The Provo Canyon Guard Quarters are built off of U.S. Route 189 a couple hundred feet above the canyon floor and on the north side of Provo Canyon. he elevation the Guard Quarters are built upon is about 5,330 feet (1,620 m). Although several of the walls remain intact, much of the architecture has deteriorated, giving way to scrub oak and additional vegetation. The quarters remain easily identifiable, however.

== History ==
In the year 1857, president James Buchanan sent a two-thousand-five-hundred-man army into the state of Utah to fight off a rumored Mormon rebellion. There was no rebellion, however, in order to protect the Church, Brigham Young responded to this action by declaring martial law and gathering in the local militia known as the Nauvoo Legion, comprising approximately one thousand two hundred men. It was at this time that fortifications were built in Echo Canyon (Summit County, Utah), Mormon Flat, and in Provo Canyon.

The Utah War was resolved in 1858 as colonel Thomas L. Kane, a respected man both among the Church members and among the federal troops, helped with negotiations. New governmental officials were set in place within the territory, including Alfred Cumming replacing Brigham Young as governor, and federal troops were staged forty miles (64 km) outside of Salt Lake City, at Camp Floyd. When the American Civil War arose in 1861, the army was forced to abandon their encampment and leave. This turned out to advantage the Church members, as the army sold many of their supplies to them at a very low cost.

== See also ==
- National Register of Historic Places listings in Utah County, Utah
