= Charles Sreeve Peterson =

American politician and bishop (1818–1889)

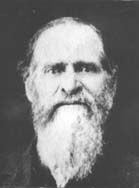

Utah Territorial Legislature 1864–1866

Personal details
- Born: July 28, 1818 Mount Holly, New Jersey, US
- Died: September 26, 1889 (aged 71) Mesa, Arizona
- Resting place: City of Mesa Cemetery
- Spouse(s): Ann Dennis; Mary Ann Patten; Ann Patten; Margaret Crispin; Mary Thompson

Charles Sreeve Peterson (July 28, 1818 – September 26, 1889) was an early Mormon leader who was the first settler of Utah's Morgan Valley, a member of the Utah Territorial Legislature, and one of the first settlers in the Mormon colonies in Mexico.

== Early life ==
Peterson was born to a poor family in Mount Holly, New Jersey. One of ten children, he went to work at age 10 to help support the family, hauling brick at a kiln during the summers and chopping wood with his father in the winters. At age 14, he apprenticed as a blacksmith.

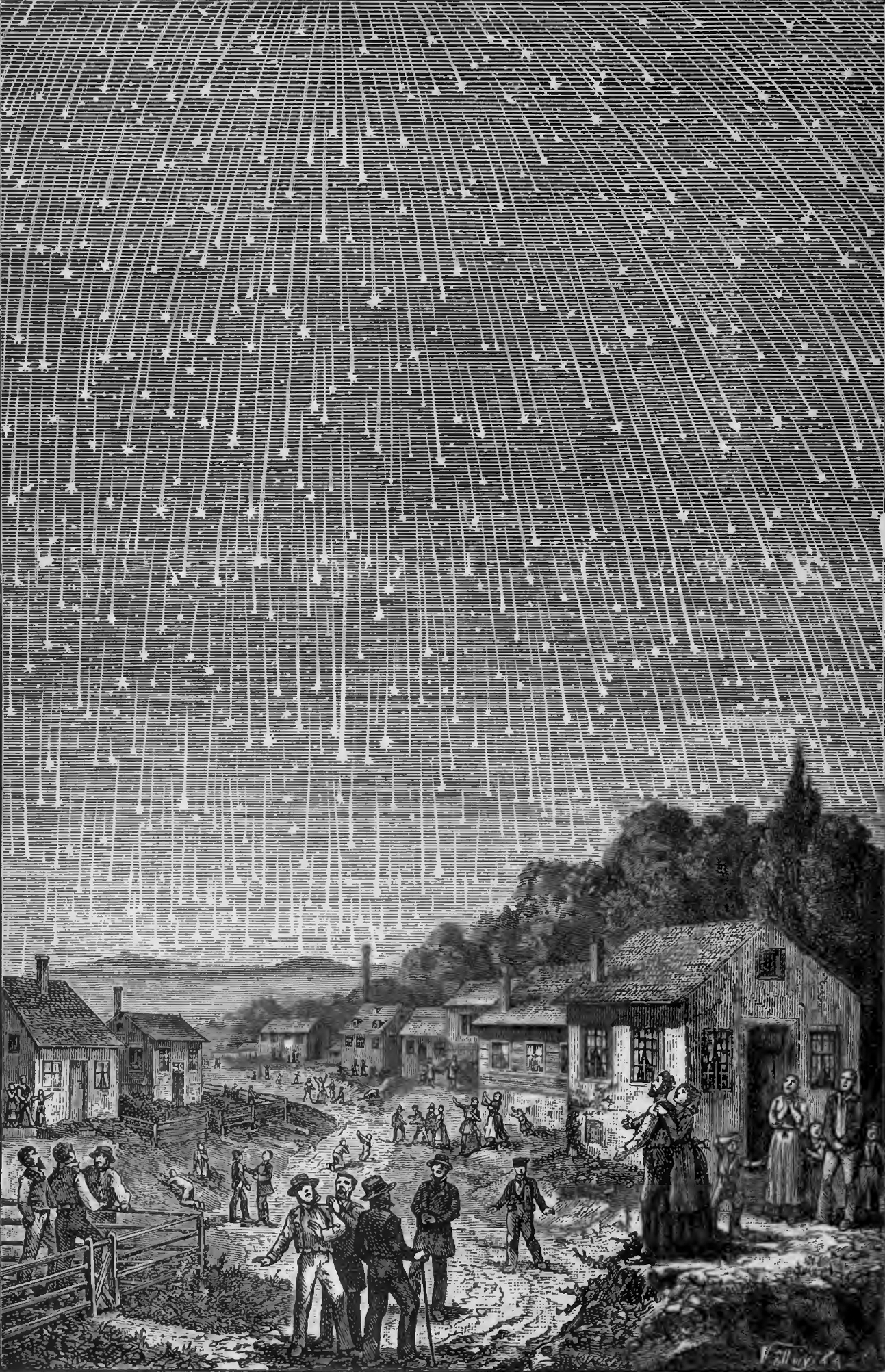
The great Leonid shower storm of 1833

On the night of November 12, 1833, one of the more spectacular Leonid meteor showers on record (dubbed the "Falling Stars Phenomenon") hit the East Coast of the United States. In the middle of the night, Peterson woke to mobs screaming the end of the world was at hand. Similar scenes played out up and down the Eastern Seaboard. But instead of rushing to the nearest church like most people, Peterson, who was not religious at the time—he later described himself as "almost an infidel"—went back to bed.

At age 17, Peterson went to work on a farm, where he attended some school. While at school, he met his future wife, Ann Dennis.

== Marriage and family ==
Peterson and his wife moved to Sreeveville, New Jersey, where he worked on a farm near town. He recalled that he "did not have an enemy that I knew of, and was respected by everyone that knew me, as an honest, respectable man with a reasonable amount of intelligence." At the age of 24, Peterson hauled coal for a man in Burlington who told him "of a strange people, whom he had just visited in Illinois." The man had been converted to their faith. He provided Peterson with a pamphlet from the group, the Mormons. That night, Peterson read the pamphlet aloud while his wife sewed. They were both convinced to join the religion. He later recalled that after joining "all turned against me, and I was ridiculed, called a fool and shunned by nearly everyone." His employer even staged an intervention, where he was told to leave the religion or lose his employment. Peterson chose the latter.

== Conversion ==
The family determined to join the Latter Day Saints in Nauvoo. On the way, they met short-lived leader John C. Bennett on a steamboat in Ohio, who warned Peterson that Joseph Smith would take his wife as soon as he arrived.

Once in Nauvoo, Charles found work with William Law, breaking hemp for one cent a day. He eventually found more-lucrative employment in a lead mine in Galena, Illinois, about 150 miles to the north. This new job required him to leave his family in Nauvoo. When he returned to Nauvoo for good in the Spring of 1844, he joined the Nauvoo Legion.

On September 12, 1844, Ann died at age 26, leaving him with 4 small children, six years and under. Charles was also 26. Stricken by grief, Peterson wondered how he could look after the children and continue to provide them a living, which included working most of the day and fishing at night. Brigham Young suggested something Peterson had not thought of: "Hunt another wife."

On March 22, 1845, Charles married Mary Ann Patten, a 23-year-old from rural Pennsylvania. They eventually had three children together. In 1849, he began practicing plural marriage when he married Mary's younger half-sister, Ann, in Iowa. They eventually had 11 children together.

== Settling Utah ==
The Petersons were driven from Nauvoo with the rest of the Mormons in 1846. Charles gave his team and wagon to the first company of pioneers and stayed behind to put his blacksmithing skills to work making more wagons. Finally, in 1849 Charles and his family crossed the plains. In 1852 they settled in Alpine, Utah, where he served as that settlement's first leader.

In 1855, Charles and his families moved to Morgan Valley in northern Utah. Unlike most other Utah settlements at the time, Charles wasn't sent by Brigham Young to begin a new community. Instead, he was persuaded by Thomas Jefferson Thurston, who had discovered the valley a short time earlier. Brigham Young later encouraged others to settle there as well.

The Petersons were the first settlers in the valley, which is surrounded on all sides by steep mountains. To get their wagons into the valley, Peterson and his sons dug and graded a new road through a narrow entrance to Weber Canyon known as "Devil's Gate". In 1846, early adopters of the Hastings Cutoff had used the same entrance only in reverse, as an exit on their way from Fort Bridger to California. Passing through was so difficult that Hastings advised the Donner Party to avoid it in the hope of saving time. However, their alternate route through Emigration Canyon slowed them down even more. The Transcontinental Railroad later came through Weber Canyon.

A few other families soon joined the Petersons, and the first white child born in Morgan County was born in a cabin built in 1857 by Charles' oldest son, George Henry. Their settlement became a town called Weber City, and was later renamed to Peterson in honor of Peterson. In 1861, Charles became the Bishop over the settlement. The Utah Territorial Legislature appointed him probate judge. He also served as the postmaster and operated a tannery and a blacksmith shop in the town.

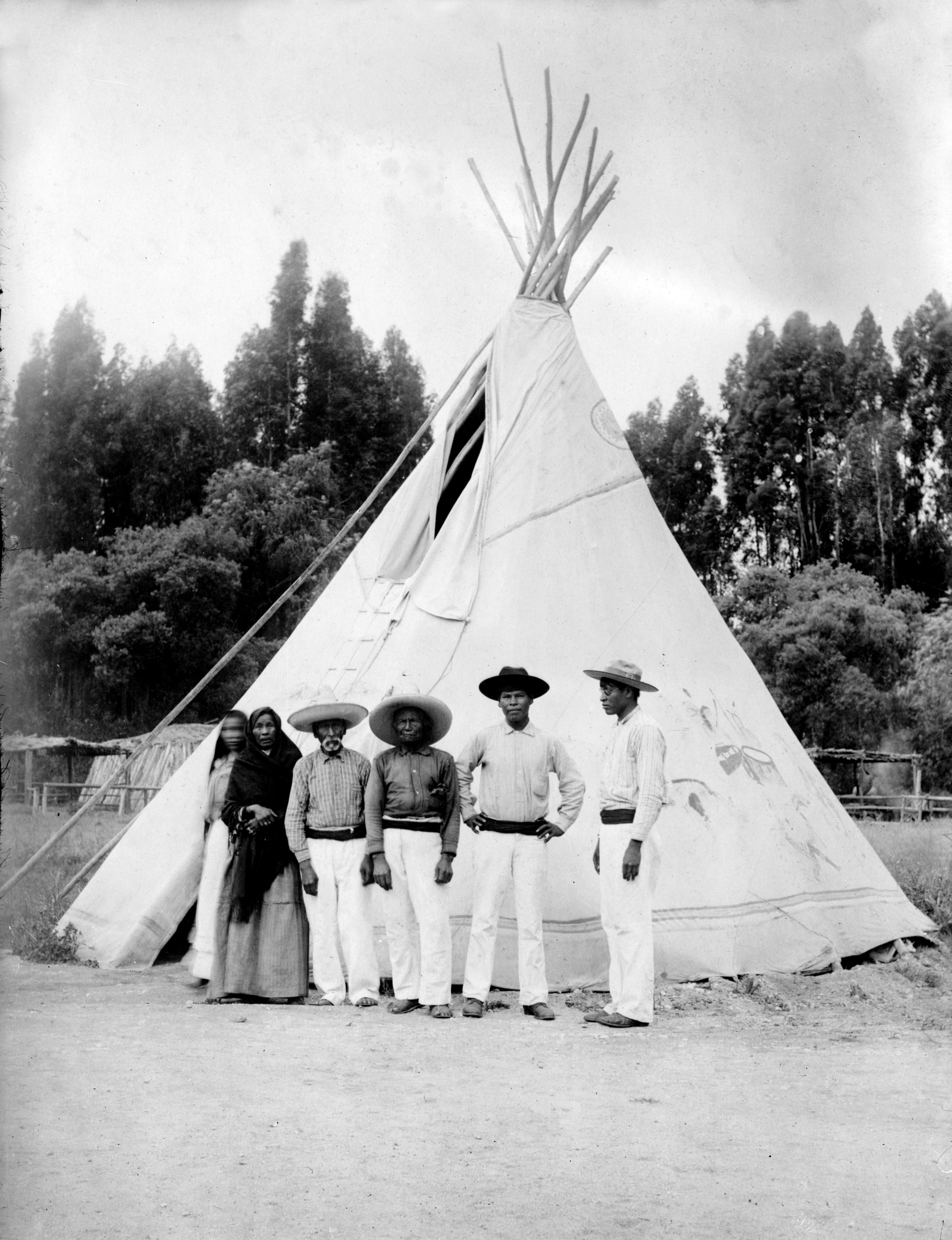
Early photograph, members of the Yaqui tribe

When the Legislature made the valley its own county in 1862, Peterson organized the county court. He served as a representative in the Legislature from 1864 to 1866. In the Spring of 1870, he married another wife, Margaret Crispin, who bore him three children. Two years later, he married Mary Thompson, who bore him 10 children.

== Settling Arizona ==
In his early sixties, Peterson moved to Fielding, Utah, in the hope of setting up a large farming operation for his families. When none of them liked the area, he joined two of his oldest sons in Mesa, Arizona, to scout for a new site. He moved his families to Mesa in August 1883.

In November 1881, Peterson was the first in a search party to spot David Patten Kimball, the head of the church in Arizona who had become lost near Seymour in the Salt River Valley.

== Mormon colonies in Mexico ==
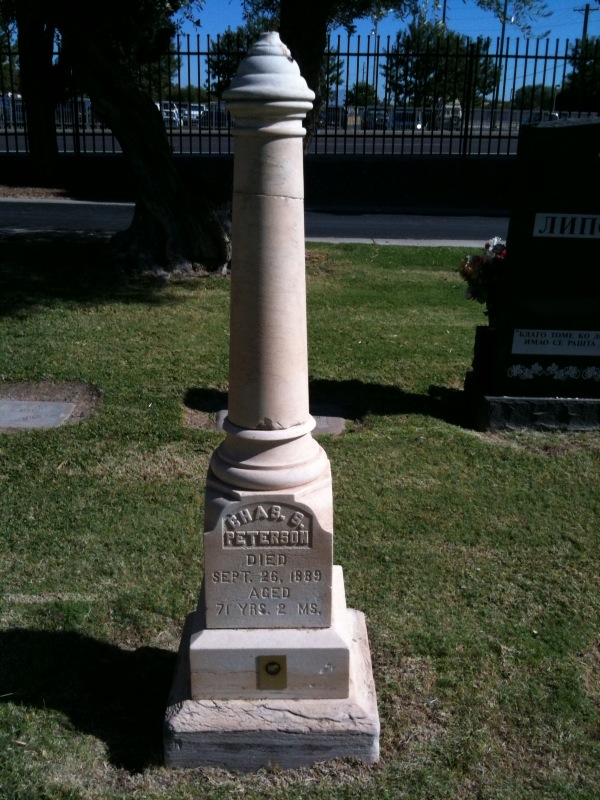
Peterson's grave in Mesa, Arizona, 2009

In 1884, David K. Udall and a few others were indicted in Arizona for unlawful cohabitation. As pressure mounted from the recently passed Edmunds Act, Peterson went to Mexico with Brigham Young, Jr., and others to negotiate land purchases for Mormon settlers in Mexico with the Mexican government and the Yaqui tribe. When Udall was convicted on perjury charges the next year (after serving three months in federal prison, he was granted a full pardon by Grover Cleveland), Charles moved with his families to Mexico. They returned to Mesa two years later, where Charles died in 1889 at the age of 71.
