= Devil's Gate-Weber Hydroelectric Power Plant =

- Devil's Gate-Weber Hydroelectric Power Plant Historic District
- U.S. National Register of Historic Places
- U.S. Historic district
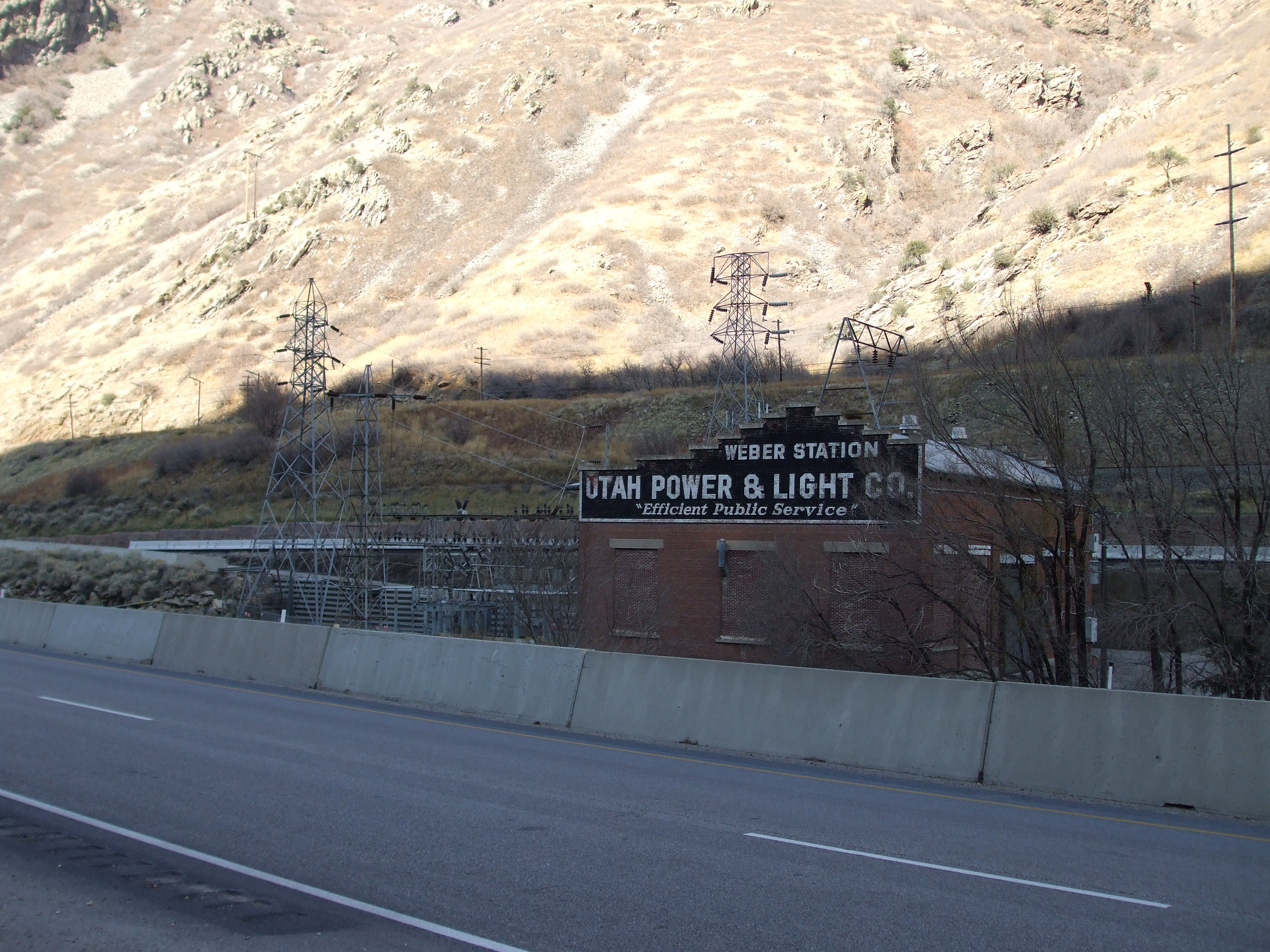

- Location within Utah Location within the United States
- Location: I-84 East of junction with US-89, power plant in Weber County; dam in Morgan County, Utah; United States
- Coordinates: 41°08′15.3″N 111°53′05″W
- Area: 3.3 acres (1.3 ha)
- Built: 1908
- Architect: Multiple
- Architectural style: Late 19th And Early 20th Century American Movements
- MPS: Electric Power Plants of Utah MPS
- NRHP reference No.: 89000276
- Added to NRHP: April 20, 1989

The Devil's Gate-Weber Hydroelectric Power Plant was built in 1909–1910 on the Weber River in northeastern Utah, United States, about 10 miles (16 km) southeast of Ogden. It was built by the Utah Light and Railway Company under the direction of E.H. Harriman, a director of the Union Pacific Railroad. It was one of the first powerplants in Utah designed to feed an electrical grid rather than as a source of power of a single locality.

== History ==
Work had begun on an intake structure in Weber Canyon in the early 1900s at the Devil's Gate location under the direction of C.K. Bannister, an engineer from Ogden. Bannister's plan for a hydroelectric station was contested by the Union Pacific, whose line ran through the canyon. Bannister died shortly after, and his business associates sold the property rights to the Utah Light and Railway Company. Work continued on a penstock to feed the power plant until Harriman acquired sixty percent of the UL&R. With Harriman's ownership Union Pacific opposition to the plant ceased, on the condition that a retaining wall be built to protect the railroad grade. The powerhouse was built in 1909–1910, along with three residences for plant operators. Harriman died in 1914 and the UL&P became the locally owned Utah Light and Traction Company, which leased the station to the Utah Power and Light Company. The dam was rebuilt in 1916–1917 to better accommodate flood flows. Another operator's residence was built in 1922, together with some utility structures in ensuing years. The plant was upgraded from 2.5 MW to 3.5MW in 1948. Automation allowed a reduction in staff in the 1960s, and two of the residences were demolished. The remaining two were damaged by flood in 1982. A fire in 1983 resulted in renovations and alterations to the powerhouse.

== Description ==
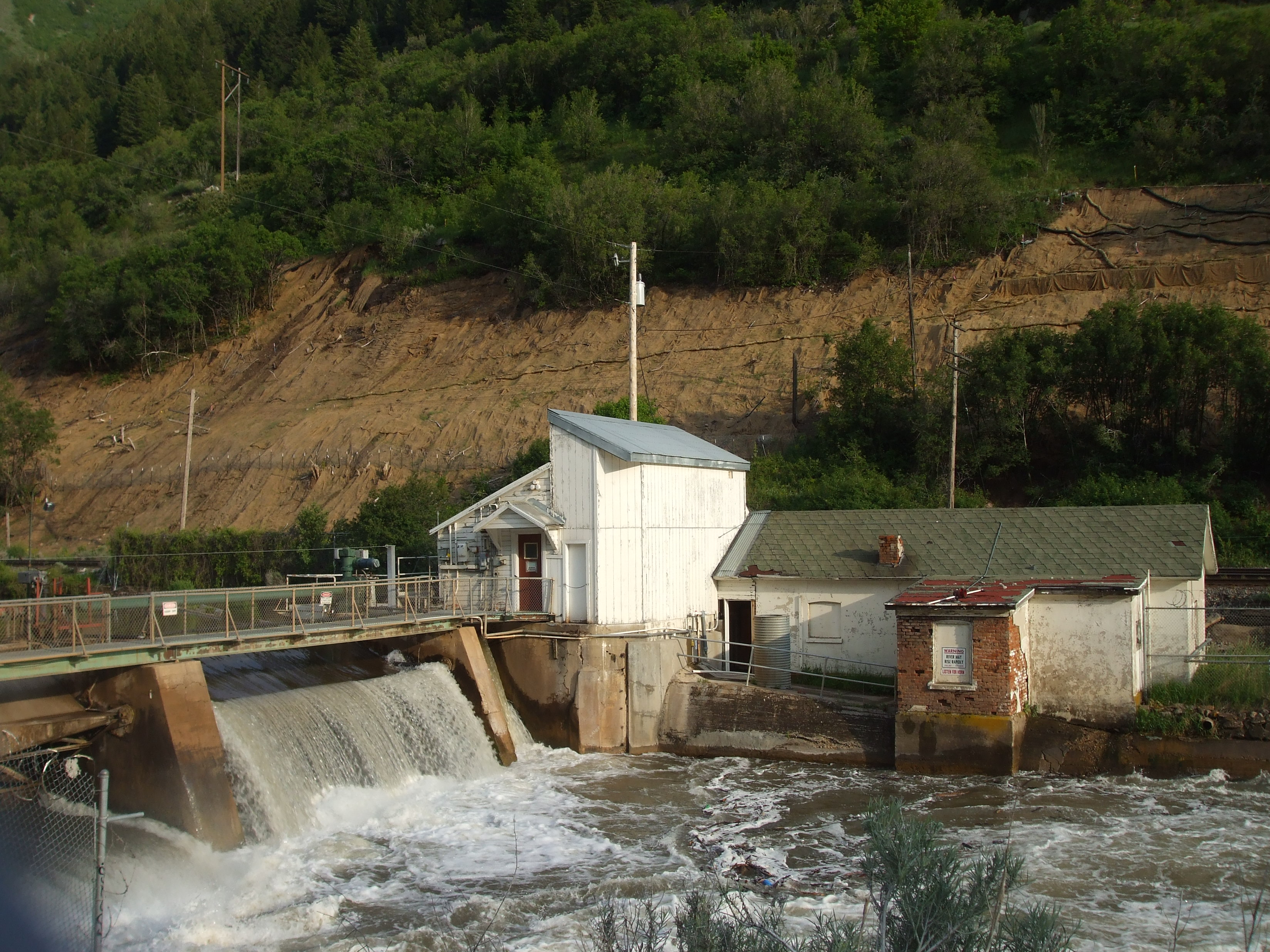
Weber Dam

Water is fed to the powerplant from a low dam about 1.75 miles (2.82 km) upstream. Overflow is controlled by two tainter gates between concrete piers. A 3-foot (0.91 m) wide fish ladder climbs the north side of the dam. On the south side a large sluice gate allows the small reservoir to be drained. The intake structure is between the sluice gate and the south buttress wall, housed in a small wood frame intake house. A one-story wood-frame watchman's house is just downstream from the intake house, and is joined to the intake house. The power plant intake conduit is a 74-inch (1.9 m) diameter reinforced concrete pipe for the first 125 feet (38 m), transitioning to a welded steel pipe. This replaced 2,000 feet (610 m) of concrete pipe and 7,075 feet (2,156 m) of wood stave pipe in 1949. The conduit is buried along most of its length. It crosses the river on a 99-foot (30 m)-span riveted steel Howe truss bridge made by the American Bridge Company downstream from the dam. Total head is about 120 feet (37 m) to 140 feet (43 m). Since the conduit has been altered and is partly buried under the rail line it is not included in the historic district designation.

The powerhouse is a rectangular brick building with a gabled concrete roof supported by riveted steel Fink trusses. The end walls are five bays wide with stepped parapets at the gables. Original window openings have been bricked in. Side elevations are three bays wide, also with infilled window openings. The structure sits on a concrete foundation that incorporates outflow works. The main room in the powerhouse accommodates a Pelton wheel turbine and a 2300 volt generator made by Western Electric, together with a small 125VDC exciter generator. The main generator was rewound during upgrade work in the 1940s. The turbine room is served by a 20-ton traveling crane made by the Whiting Foundry Equipment Company. Three other rooms house batteries, a workshop, and a third room formerly housed switchgear.

The operator's camp once had four houses. Two remain, a one-story brick house and a 1922 wood cottage. Both houses retain landscaping and garden areas with outdoor fireplaces. There are several outbuildings associated with the property. The Davis and Weber Canal Company maintains a diversion dam just downstream from the powerhouse that is not part of the historic district.

The powerhouse and associated structures were placed on the National Register of Historic Places on April 20, 1989. It is visible from Interstate 84 in Weber Canyon, between the lanes of the highway, whose westbound lanes pass just to the north.

== See also ==
- National Register of Historic Places listings in Morgan County, Utah
- National Register of Historic Places listings in Weber County, Utah
