= South Round Valley School =

- U.S. National Register of Historic Places
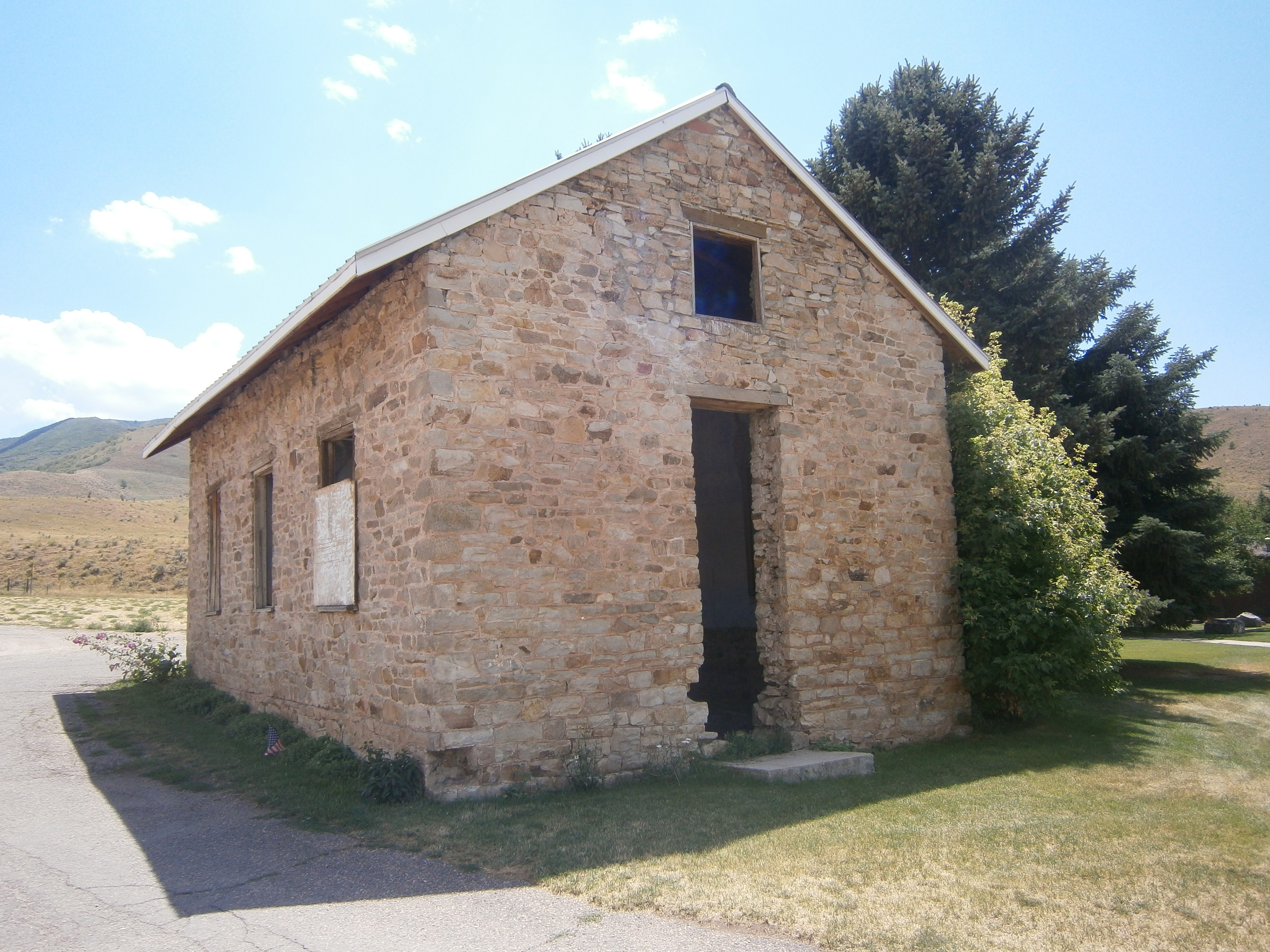
- Photo from 2013

- Location within Utah Location within the United States
- Nearest city: Morgan, Utah
- Coordinates: 41.043188°N 111.630917°W
- Area: less than one acre
- Built: 1873
- Built by: Henry Olpin, mason
- Architectural style: Classical
- NRHP reference No.: 11000233
- Added to NRHP: April 27, 2011

The South Round Valley School, in Morgan County, Utah near Morgan, Utah, was built in 1873 by stonemason Henry Olpin. It was listed on the National Register of Historic Places in 2011.

It is asserted to have elements of Classical architectural style.

It is a one-room schoolhouse.

It is located east of Morgan at 1925 E. Round Valley Rd. adjacent to, or on the grounds of, what is now the Round Valley Golf Course.
