= Daniel Heiner House =

- U.S. National Register of Historic Places
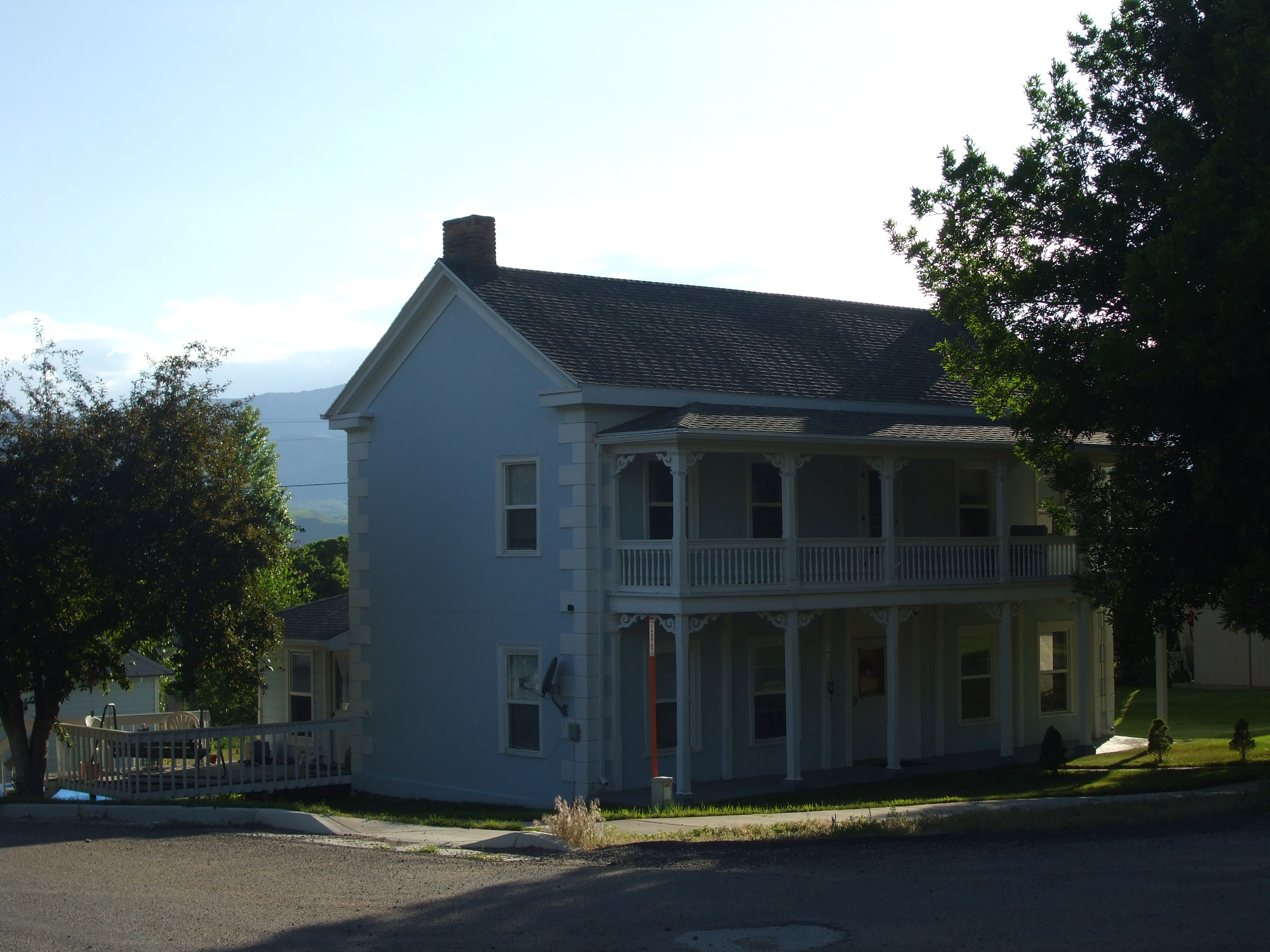

- Location within Utah Location within the United States
- Location: 543 N. 700 East, Morgan, Utah
- Coordinates: 41°03′03″N 111°40′36″W
- Area: less than one acre
- NRHP reference No.: 78002664
- Added to NRHP: December 20, 1978

The Daniel Heiner House, at 543 N. 700 East in Morgan, Utah, was listed on the National Register of Historic Places in 1978.

It is a five-bay two-story I-form central hall plan house with a two-story porch, with porch columns matching the five bays on each floor.

It was the home of pioneer Daniel Heiner, a member of the Church of Jesus Christ of Latter-day Saints who married his brother's widow and also married another woman, together in a double ceremony in 1873. He was mayor of Morgan for two years and was president of the First National Bank of Morgan for 16 years.
