= Peterson, Utah =

Unincorporated community in the state of Utah, United States

- Unincorporated community
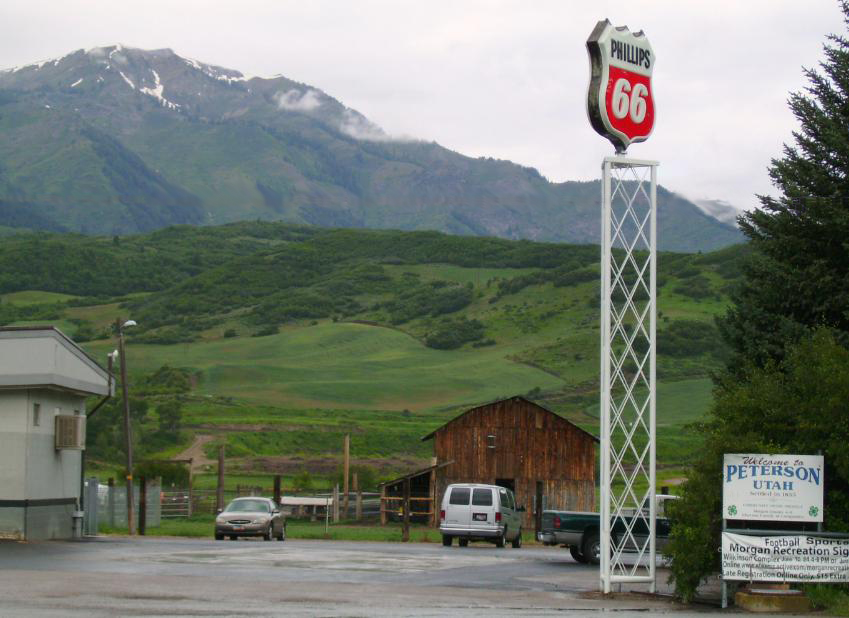
- An intersection in Peterson, Utah, June 2009

- Location within Utah
- Coordinates: 41°07′05″N 111°46′04″W
- Country: United States
- State: Utah
- County: Morgan
- Settled: 1855
- Named after: Charles Sreeve Peterson
- Elevation: 4,885 ft (1,489 m)
- Time zone: UTC-7 (Mountain (MST))
  - Summer (DST): UTC-6 (MDT)
- GNIS feature ID: 1444301

Peterson is an unincorporated community in northwestern Morgan County, Utah, United States.

== History ==
Peterson was settled in 1855, and was originally named Weber City after the nearby Weber River. The first public building, a combination school and LDS Church, was opened in 1861. The town was designated county seat in 1862, and remained so for four years, until it was replaced by Littleton in 1866, and then Morgan in 1868. The Peterson General Store, which also housed a U.S. post office, opened in 1869. Other businesses included the Dexter Hotel, a train station, and a stockyard.

In 1872, the town's name was changed to Peterson to honor an early settler, Charles Sreeve Peterson. Peterson was a Mormon leader, and the first settler of Morgan County.

== Geography ==
Peterson is located in northwest Morgan Valley, near Peterson Creek and Interstate 84, 7 miles (11 km) northwest of the town of Morgan.

Thurston Peak, the highest peak in the county at an elevation of 9,706 feet (2,958 m), is located near Peterson.

== Demographics ==
Historical population
Census	Pop.	Note	%±
1880	301		—
1890	271		−10.0%
1900	302		11.4%
1910	277		−8.3%
1920	312		12.6%
1930	308		−1.3%
1940	400		29.9%
1950	289		−27.7%
Source: U.S. Census Bureau
