= Morgan Union Pacific Depot =

- U.S. National Register of Historic Places
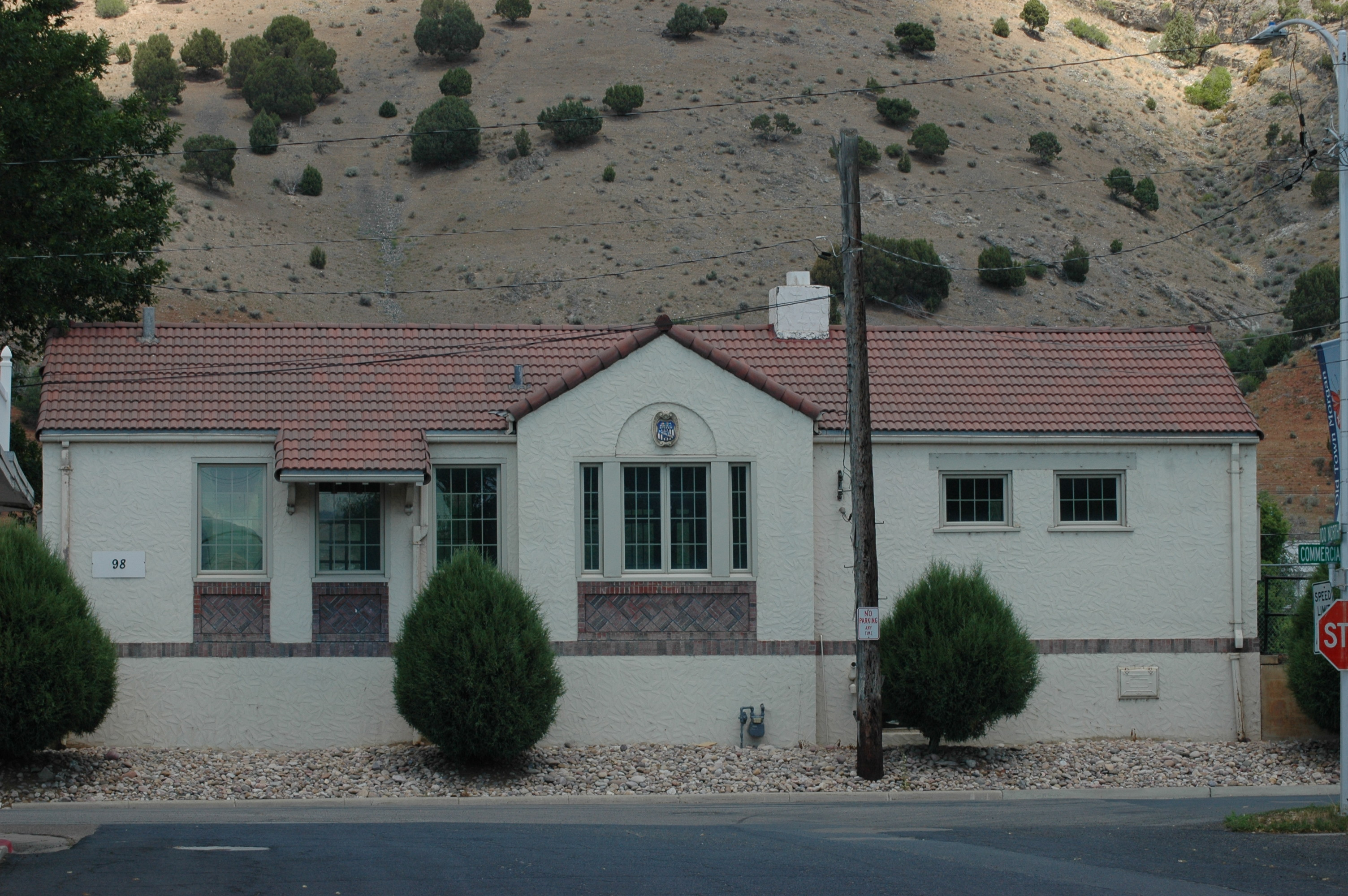

- Location within Utah
- Location: 98 N. Commercial St., Morgan, Utah
- Coordinates: 41°02′28″N 111°39′58″W
- Area: less than one acre
- Built: 1926
- Built by: Ryberg-Sorenson Inc.
- Architectural style: Mission/spanish Revival
- NRHP reference No.: 11000757
- Added to NRHP: October 20, 2011

The Morgan Union Pacific Depot, at 98 N. Commercial St. in Morgan, Utah, was built in 1926.

It was listed on the National Register of Historic Places in 2011.

It has also been known as the Morgan Union Pacific Railroad Depot and as Morgan Station.

It may have been designed by Gilbert Stanley Underwood.

It was used as a passenger depot until 1972. A freight portion of the depot was moved to a new location.

== After Union Pacific's Ownership ==
The Depot got transferred to Morgan County's ownership in 1982 after The Union Pacific Railroad found no use in the Depot.

It was used as Morgan's Planning & Zoning office for an unknown amount of years. Possibly from the early 1980's after transfer of ownership from Union Pacific to its "Abandonment" in the early 2000's.

== Restoration ==
The Restoration of the Depot starts in the early 2020's. It's restoration completed in early 2024, that's when The Morgan County Historical Society gained control of the station.

== Union Pacific #25822 ==
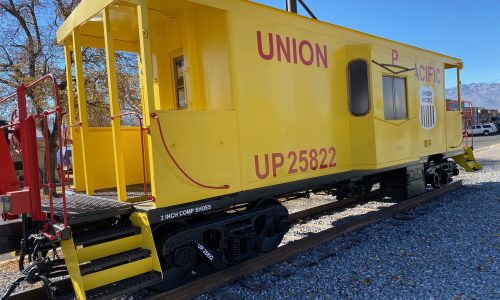
Morgan's UP Caboose

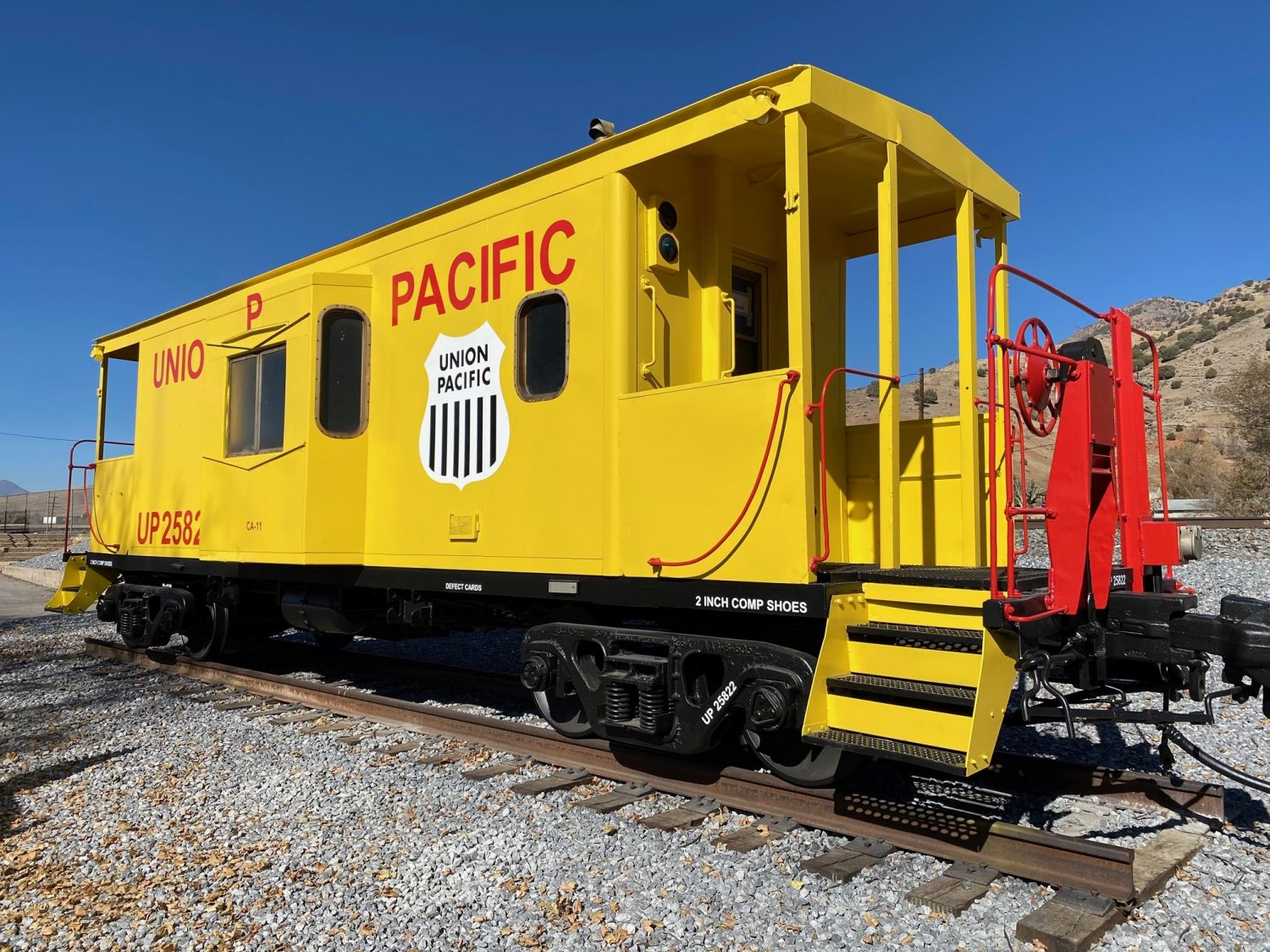
Morgan's UP Caboose

Union Pacific 25822 is a Class CA-11 steel caboose, built in 1979 by International Car, which served as a "snow bus" crew shuttle in Ogden, Utah, before being retired and donated to the city of Morgan, Utah, in 2019. It is now preserved on display near the historic Morgan Union Pacific Train Depot.

Preceding station	Union Pacific Railroad	Following station
Uintah toward Ogden	Overland Route	Echo toward Council Bluffs Transfer
