= Mountain Green, Utah =

Mountain Green
- CDP
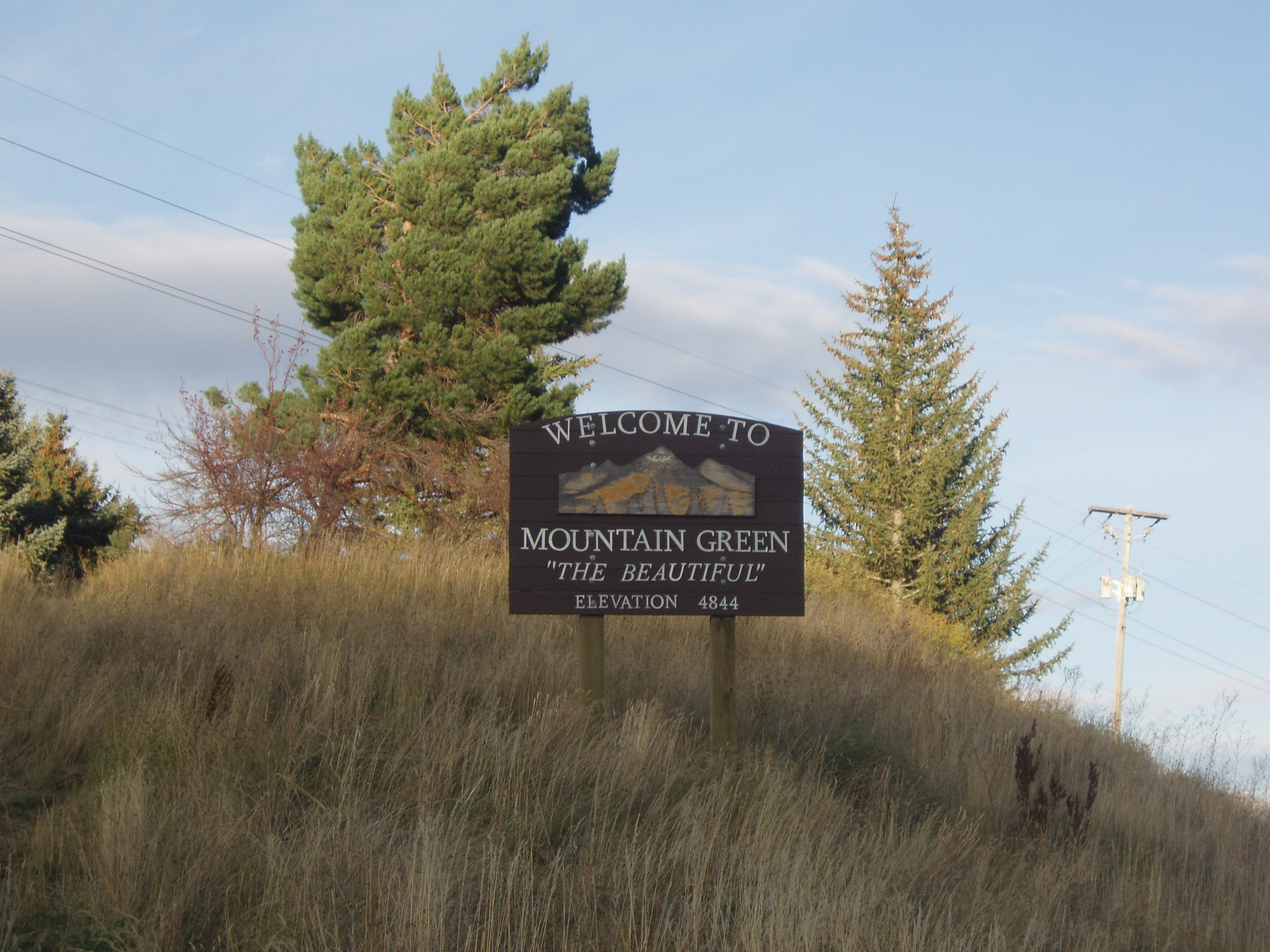
- Welcome sign

- Location in Morgan County and the state of Utah
- Coordinates: 41°08′44″N 111°47′11″W
- Country: United States
- State: Utah
- County: Morgan

Area
  - Total: 5.5 sq mi (14 km^{2})
  - Land: 5.4 sq mi (14 km^{2})
  - Water: 0.1 sq mi (0.26 km^{2})
- Elevation: 4,915 ft (1,498 m)

Population (2020)
  - Total: 4,231
  - Density: 780/sq mi (300/km^{2})
- Time zone: UTC-7 (Mountain (MST))
  - Summer (DST): UTC-6 (MDT)
- ZIP code: 84050
- Area codes: 385, 801
- GNIS feature ID: 2584772

Mountain Green is a census-designated place in northwestern Morgan County, Utah, United States. The population was 4,231 at the 2020 census. Located 16 miles (26 km) up the Weber River from Ogden, Mountain Green is the world headquarters of the Browning Arms Company.

== Geography ==
Mountain Green lies in Morgan Valley at the east end of lower Weber Canyon, just north of I-84 at the interchange with Utah State Route 167 (Trappers Loop). The community is located in the northwest corner of Morgan County, and includes the lowest point in the county.

== History ==
=== Deserters Point ===
The present-day site of Mountain Green was the location of a historic meeting of three groups of mountain men in May 1825. Peter Skene Ogden, leading 58 trappers from the British Hudson's Bay Company, camped here on May 22, 1825. The next day, 25 American Rocky Mountain Fur Company trappers belonging to John Henry Weber's brigade arrived under the command of Johnson Gardner. Étienne Provost was also encamped in the area, with his own company of 15.

On May 24, 1825 John Gray, a half-Iroquois leader of the freemen trappers who were dissatisfied with the conditions and pay under the Hudson's Bay Company, declared their intention to leave Ogden's brigade. The HBC freemen had spent the previous several days with Johnson Gardner's group, and had brought the Americans back with them to support the freemen's plan to desert, seeking higher payments for their furs and lower prices for supplies. Several men who had previously deserted HBC encouraged others to come along. In the end 23 Hudson's Bay Company trappers deserted, taking some 700 pelts with them. Ogden and his remaining men left the area the next day.

This encounter led to a territorial dispute. Gardner and his men claimed the Hudson's Bay Company trappers were violating United States soil, while Ogden insisted the area was jointly controlled by the U.S. and the United Kingdom. Provost, who remained neutral in the argument, was in fact the only one with a valid claim. The Adams–Onís Treaty of 1819 had recognized Spain's rights to the territory south of the 42nd parallel. Control had then passed in 1822 to newly independent Mexico, whose government had granted Provost a license for his activities in the region.

The deserting HBC freemen joined the American trappers on their way to Henrys Fork (Green River) about 120 miles to the east for the first of what was to be sixteen Rocky Mountain Rendezvous, organized by fur trade entrepreneur William H. Ashley, which took place on July 1, 1825. For some years prior, American trappers and mountain men had traveled as much as 2,000 miles to transport their furs to markets in St. Louis. For the Spanish, Taos was a common destination.

The site became known as Deserters Point. Today there is a rest stop there, with a historical marker. The highway which connects Mountain Green with the Ogden Valley over the ridge to the north is named Trappers Loop.

=== Settlement ===
When Mormon pioneers began to arrive in Morgan County in the 1850s, they found a man named Ben Simon already in possession of the land in the Mountain Green area. The Mexican government had granted Simon the use of this land for grazing cattle, sometime before the 1848 Treaty of Guadalupe Hidalgo. He and his brother James had apparently been trading with the Shoshone in the vicinity for some 20 years. Such early settlers as George W. Higley and Gordon Beckstead moved to Mountain Green in the 1850s with permission from the Simons and the Native Americans. The settlement was named Mountain Green due to its abundant green grass. In 1877 the population was about 150, but a number of families left in fear of conflict with the Indians, and the 1880 census showed only 75 residents.

=== Modern era ===
Circa 1960, the Ogden-based Browning Arms Company found the need for a rural test-firing facility. They purchased a Mountain Green farm in 1961, and by 1968 Browning had relocated its executive offices, research and development, sales and data processing to the Morgan County location.

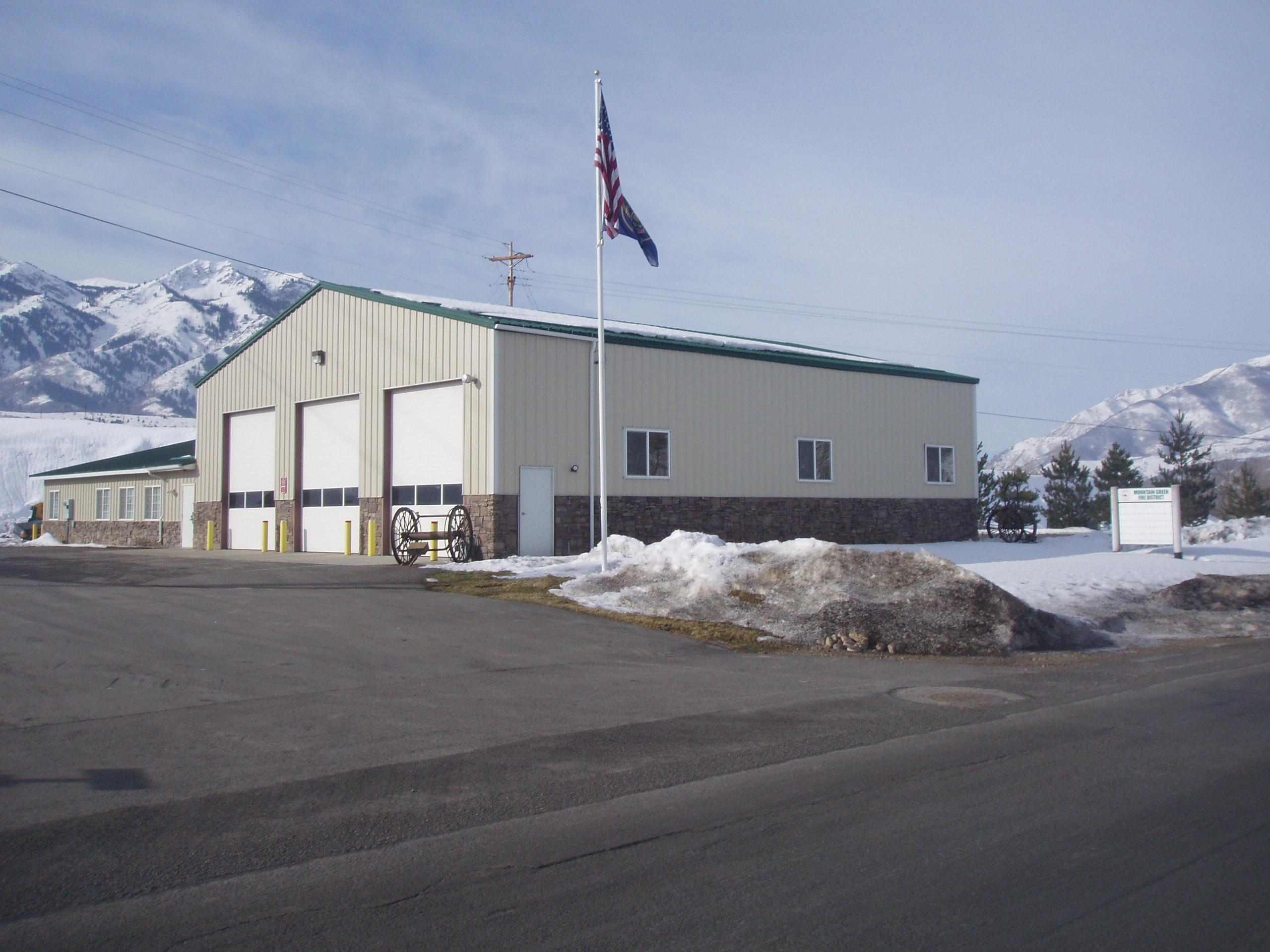
Mountain Green Fire District

A volunteer fire department called the Mountain Green Fire District was established here in July 1971. It was started due to a perceived need for faster response times than the county fire station some 10 miles (16 km) away in Morgan could provide. A separate fire station was built in 1973. In 1997, the Insurance Services Office evaluated the Mountain Green Fire District and gave it a Fire Suppression Rating Schedule rating of class 6, equal to the grade of the Morgan Fire Department.

Mountain Green has remained unincorporated and largely undeveloped, but is growing quickly. In 2007 the northern Utah section of the American Institute of Architects offered a design assistance team to develop guidelines for a new Mountain Green town center.

== Demographics ==
=== 2020 census ===
As of the 2020 census, Mountain Green had a population of 4,231. The median age was 33.6 years. 37.5% of residents were under the age of 18 and 10.0% of residents were 65 years of age or older. For every 100 females there were 107.2 males, and for every 100 females age 18 and over there were 104.5 males age 18 and over.

0.0% of residents lived in urban areas, while 100.0% lived in rural areas.

There were 1,147 households in Mountain Green, of which 53.4% had children under the age of 18 living in them. Of all households, 85.1% were married-couple households, 7.3% were households with a male householder and no spouse or partner present, and 6.5% were households with a female householder and no spouse or partner present. About 7.5% of all households were made up of individuals and 4.0% had someone living alone who was 65 years of age or older.

There were 1,167 housing units, of which 1.7% were vacant. The homeowner vacancy rate was 0.3% and the rental vacancy rate was 1.5%.

Racial composition as of the 2020 census
Race	Number	Percent
White	4,029	95.2%
Black or African American	2	0.0%
American Indian and Alaska Native	14	0.3%
Asian	27	0.6%
Native Hawaiian and Other Pacific Islander	0	0.0%
Some other race	8	0.2%
Two or more races	151	3.6%
Hispanic or Latino (of any race)	125	3.0%

=== 2010 census ===
As of the census of 2010, there were 2,309 people living in the CDP. There were 688 housing units. The racial makeup of the CDP was 97.8% White, 0.1% American Indian and Alaska Native, 0.9% Asian, 0.5% from some other race, and 0.7% from two or more races. Hispanic or Latino of any race were 2.1% of the population.

== Education ==
Mountain Green has its own elementary school and middle school, Mountain Green Elementary School and Mountain Green Middle School. Older students attend Morgan High School in Morgan.

== See also ==
- List of census-designated places in Utah
