= John Henry Weber =

American explorer (1779–1859)

- Born: c. 1779; Altona, Duchy of Holstein, Holy Roman Empire
- Died: 1859 (aged c. 80); Bellevue, Jackson County, Iowa
- Occupations: Frontiersman, trapper, fur trader, hunter, explorer
- Employer: Rocky Mountain Fur Company
- Known for: Namesake of the Weber River

John Henry Weber (1779–1859) was an American fur trader and explorer active in the early years of the fur trade, exploring the Rocky Mountains and other areas in Utah. The Weber River, Weber State University, and Weber County, Utah were named after Weber.

== Early life ==
John Henry Weber was born in Altona, then ruled by the King of Denmark as the Duke of Holstein and now a borough of Hamburg in Germany. Weber immigrated to the United States in 1807, where he was hired by the United States Army Ordnance Department to keep records for the government-owned lead mines in Sainte Genevieve, Missouri.

== Into the Fur Trade ==
Weber became acquainted with William Henry Ashley and Andrew Henry who conducted the beaver trade in the drainage basin of the Upper Missouri River. He joined a Rocky Mountain Fur Company expedition which departed St. Louis, Missouri in the spring of 1822. Other trappers in this group included Jim Bridger, David Jackson, Jedediah Smith, Thomas Fitzpatrick, Hugh Glass, James Clyman, Daniel T. Potts, and Milton Sublette. This was the first party of American trappers to cross the continental divide.

Upon reaching the mouth of the Yellowstone River, the company divided into two independent brigades, with Weber serving in a leadership position. During the summer of 1824, Weber's brigade crossed South Pass and the Green River Valley and descended into the Bear River region in time for a fall hunt. As winter approached, the company journeyed to Bear Lake, then to the Bear River's northern bend and finally south into the Cache Valley. The brigade spent the winter of 1824–25 on Cub Creek near present-day Cove, Utah. While in Cache Valley, the group discussed the possible course and ultimate outlet of the Bear River. According to his own account, the young Bridger was selected to settle the question by floating down the river. For many years Bridger was credited with the discovery of the Great Salt Lake. More recent evidence suggests that Canadian-American Etienne Provost and his trapping party, working out of Taos in Mexican territory, visited the southern edge of the inland sea earlier in the same winter.

The following spring, Weber's brigade traveled throughout extreme southeastern Idaho and northern Utah. A portion of the brigade, under the leadership of Johnson Gardner, confronted Peter Skene Ogden, the leader of Hudson's Bay Company (HBC) Snake Country Expedition near present-day Mountain Green, Utah. Gardner insisted that they were in United States territory. Ogden countered that the area in contention was under joint occupation. During the incident Gardner was able to lure a number of men, many of them Canadian Iroquois, away from their British employer by offering higher prices for their furs. The reduction in force led Ogden to retrace his steps back to the HBC "Flathead House" near Flathead Lake in modern Montana. That summer, Weber and his brigade were at the first rendezvous held in Sweetwater County, Wyoming, near present McKinnon, just north of the Utah border.

Weber's remaining mountain years are less well documented; however, he spent the winter of 1825–26 in the Salt Lake Valley, after Ashley's men were forced by severe winter weather to move their winter quarters from Cache Valley. It appears that Utah's Weber River was christened during this winter camp. This name gave rise to the present names of Utah's Weber Canyon, Weber County and Weber State University.

Weber attended the rendezvous of 1826 in Cache Valley and left the fur trade, and the West, shortly thereafter. However, some accounts confuse John Henry Weber with a trapper named John Weber, who was killed by Indians in the winter of 1828–29.

== Later years and death ==
Weber spent the remainder of his life in the American Midwest, first returning to Ste. Genevieve, Missouri, and his former position as a recorder with the U.S. government. In 1833, he was the assistant superintendent of U.S. government lead mines in Galena, Illinois, and served briefly as superintendent until his retirement in 1840. He moved to Bellevue, Jackson County, Iowa, where he died by suicide in February 1859, an act triggered by pain associated with a medical problem described as facial neuralgia.

== Pronunciation ==
The proper pronunciation of Weber's surname, Weeber or Webber, has been debated. In the American East and Midwest, where Weber spent most of his life, the name is pronounced as Webber. This is substantiated by Warren Angus Ferris' map of the fur trade era in which he gives the name of the Weber River as "Webber's Fork." However, references by other fur trappers, such as Osborne Russell and Daniel Potts, give credence to the long vowel sound. The long vowel pronunciation is used in all Utah place names. Weber's own family descendants use the traditional Midwest pronunciation of Webber.

== Sources ==
- Despain, S. Matthew; Gowans, Fred R. (1994), "Weber, John Henry", in Powell, Allan Kent (ed.), Utah History Encyclopedia, Salt Lake City, Utah: University of Utah Press, ISBN 0874804256, OCLC 30473917
- Hafen, LeRoy R., ed. (2003) The Mountain Men and the Fur Trade of the Far West (Glendale, California: Arthur H. Clark Company. volume 9, pages 379–384) ISBN 9780870620997
- Morgan, Dale L. (1964) The West of William H. Ashley (Old West Publishing Company)
- Roberts, Richard C., and Sadler, Richard W. (1997) A History of Weber County (Salt Lake City: Weber County Commission) ISBN 9780913738146
- Walker J.P. (2015) The Legendary Mountain Men of North America (Lulu.com) ISBN 9781312921511
