= List of Utah area codes =

Utah numbering plan areas (385/801 highlighted in red and 435 uncolored)

The state of Utah is divided into two telephone numbering plan areas in the North American Numbering Plan (NANP), which are assigned a total of three area codes, organized as an overlay complex for the Salt Lake City area with two codes, and one code for the rest of the state.

| Area code | Year created | Parent NPA | Overlay | Numbering plan area |
|---|---|---|---|---|
| 801 | 1947 | – | 385/801 | Salt Lake City metropolitan area, including American Fork, Bountiful, Kaysville, Morgan, Ogden, Orem, Provo, Spanish Fork |
| 385 | 2009 | 801 | 385/801 | Salt Lake City metropolitan area, including American Fork, Bountiful, Kaysville, Morgan, Ogden, Orem, Provo, Spanish Fork |
| 435 | 1997 | 801 | – | All other counties outside of NPA 801 |
