= Area code 435 =

Area code in Utah, United States

Coordinates: 39.5°N 111.5°W

Numbering plan area 435 in Utah

Area code 435 is a telephone area code in the North American Numbering Plan (NANP) for most of the U.S. state of Utah. Area code 435 was created in 1997 in a split of area code 801.

The numbering plan area excludes the region of the Wasatch Front, which comprises the Salt Lake City, Ogden, and Provo metropolitan areas in northern Utah, and is served by area codes 801 and 385.

== History ==
The state of Utah was a single numbering plan area, with area code 801, when the American Telephone and Telegraph Company (AT&T) devised the first nationwide telephone numbering plan in 1947.

On September 21, 1997, the 801 numbering plan area was geographically reduced to just a four-county area along the Wasatch Front, including Salt Lake City, to provide more numbers to the region. The rest of the state, much less populated, received the new area code 435, which completely surrounds 801. This numbering plan area includes Beaver, Brigham City, Castle Dale, Cedar City, Coalville, Duchesne, Fillmore, Heber City, Hurricane, Junction, Kanab, Loa, Logan, Manila, Manti, Moab, Monticello, Nephi, Park City, Panguitch, Parowan, Price, Randolph, Richfield, St. George, Tooele, Washington, and Vernal.

The area code also serves the Colorado City, Arizona school district.

435 is one of the most thinly populated area codes in the nation. The Wasatch Front is home to the great majority of Utah's population, and most of its landlines and cell phones. As a result, 435 is nowhere near exhaustion. Under current projections, 435 will not exhaust until 2041.

== See also ==
- List of Utah area codes
- List of North American Numbering Plan area codes

Utah area codes: 385/801, 435
	North: 208/986, 307	
West: 775	435	East: 307, 970
	South: 928	
Arizona area codes: 520, 602/480/623, 928
Colorado area codes: 303/720/983, 719, 748/970
Idaho area codes: 208/986
Nevada area codes: 702/725, 775
Wyoming area codes: 307
