= Area codes 801 and 385 =

Area codes for greater Salt Lake City, UT

Coordinates: 40.8°N 111.9°W

Utah's numbering plan area 385/801 (red)

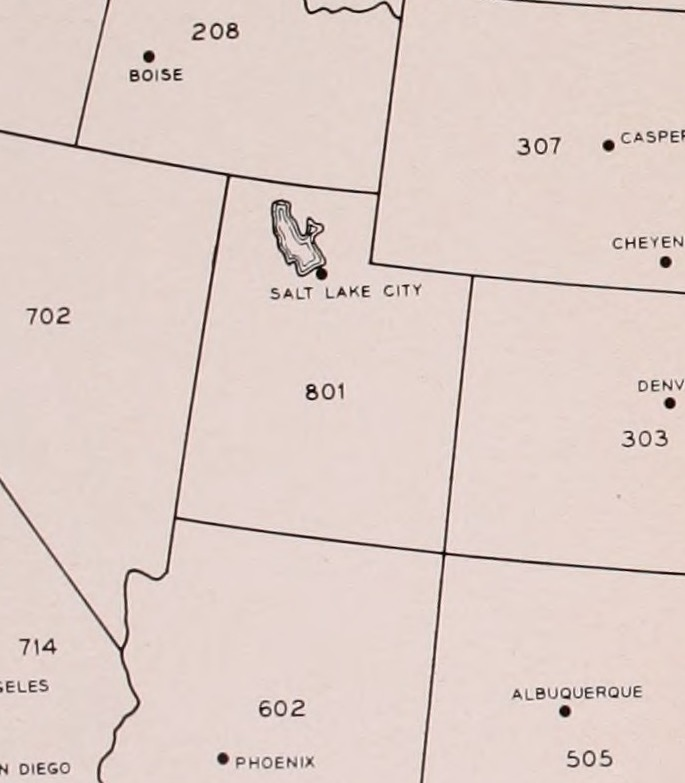
The original 1947 Utah numbering plan area, as shown on a 1952 map.

Area codes 801 and 385 are telephone area codes in the North American Numbering Plan (NANP) serving Salt Lake City and the four surrounding counties of the Wasatch Front in north-central Utah. The numbering plan area comprises Davis, Morgan, Salt Lake, Utah, and Weber counties. Other major towns and cities within the area are Alta, American Fork, Bountiful, Layton, Lehi, Murray, Ogden, Orem, Provo, Sandy, South Jordan, Spanish Fork, Taylorsville, West Jordan, and West Valley City. This numbering plan area is located in the Mountain Time Zone. Area code 801 is one of the original North American area codes created in 1947. Area code 385 was assigned to the same numbering plan area in 2008, creating an overlay complex.

== History ==
The state of Utah was a single numbering plan area, assigned area code 801, when the American Telephone and Telegraph Company (AT&T) devised the first nationwide telephone numbering plan for Operator Toll Dialing in 1947. Despite Utah's growth in the second half of the 20th century, this scheme remained in place for 50 years.

On September 21, 1997, the numbering plan area was geographically reduced to the Wasatch Front, while the rest of Utah was assigned area code 435. This resulted in 801 being an enclave area code and also became one of the six doughnut area codes in the NANP.

This split was originally intended to be a long-term solution. However, the Wasatch Front is not only home to most of Utah's landlines, but also the great majority of its pagers, cell phones and fax machines. As a result, within only two years of the 435 split, it became apparent that the Wasatch Front needed another area code.

In 2000, the Public Service Commission of Utah (PSC) approved a split for 801 in 2001, in which Salt Lake County would have retained the 801 area code and the rest of the Wasatch Front would have been assigned area code 385. Conservation measures, such as number pooling, postponed the split for more than seven years.

In July 2007, the PSC announced that the capacity created by the conservation measures would be exhausted by June 2008, finally necessitating the implementation of area code 385. The same announcement stated that 385 would be implemented as an overlay rather than a split, so that the Wasatch Front would be served by both area codes. Everyone who already had an 801 number could keep it. 385 entered service on June 1, 2008, with a year-long permissive dialing period beginning during which seven and ten-digit calls could be completed. Ten-digit dialing became mandatory along the Wasatch Front on June 1, 2009. As new wireless devices have become prominent over new landline adoption, outside abandoned 801 numbers being placed back into the pool, most new numbers have been assigned the 385 area code.

== See also ==
- List of Utah area codes
- List of North American Numbering Plan area codes

Utah area codes: 385/801, 435
	North: 435	
West: 435	385/801	East: 435
	South: 435	
