= Morgan County, Utah =

County in Utah, United States

- County
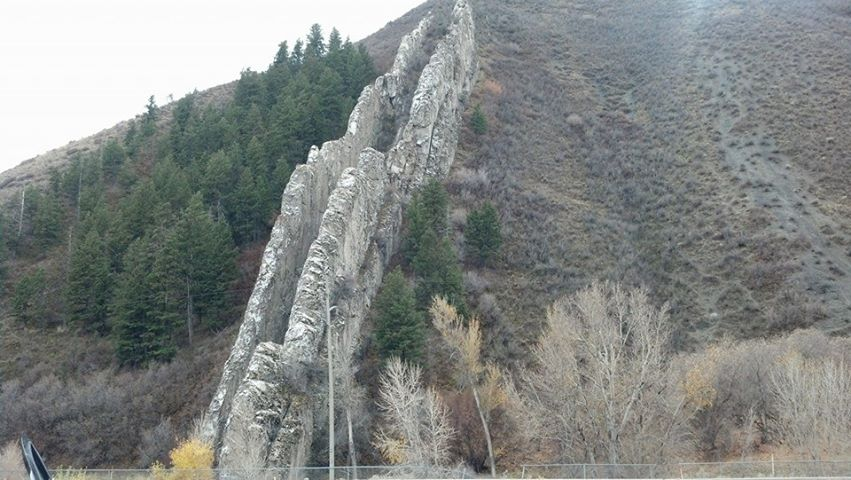
- Devil's Slide, a limestone rock formation in Weber Canyon, November 2013.

- Location within the U.S. state of Utah
- Coordinates: 41.08°N 111.58°W
- Country: United States
- State: Utah
- Founded: January 17, 1862
- Named for: Jedediah Morgan Grant
- Seat: Morgan
- Largest city: Morgan

Area
  - Total: 611 sq mi (1,580 km^{2})
  - Land: 609 sq mi (1,580 km^{2})
  - Water: 1.7 sq mi (4.4 km^{2}) 0.3%

Population (2020)
  - Total: 12,295
  - Estimate (2025): 13,383 ▲
  - Density: 20.2/sq mi (7.79/km^{2})
- Time zone: UTC−7 (Mountain)
  - Summer (DST): UTC−6 (MDT)
- Congressional district: 1st
- Website: www.morgancountyutah.gov

Morgan County is a county in northern Utah, United States. As of the 2020 United States census, the population was 12,295. Its county seat and largest city is Morgan. Morgan County is part of the Ogden-Clearfield metropolitan area as well as the Salt Lake City Combined Statistical Area.

== History ==
An early route of the Hastings Cutoff ran through the Morgan Valley and down through a narrow gorge in Weber Canyon. The Donner Party avoided going through the Morgan Valley in order to speed up their journey. However, their alternate route proved more time-consuming.

In 1855, Charles Sreeve Peterson and his family became the first white settlers to take up permanent residence in the Morgan Valley after cutting a road through Weber Canyon. After others began settling in the rather limited planar areas of the mountainous territory, the Utah Territory legislature acted on January 17, 1862, to form a separate county from sections partitioned off Davis, Great Salt Lake, Summit, and Weber counties. The small settlement at Morgan was named the county seat. The town (and thus the new county) was named for the father (Jedediah Morgan Grant) of Heber J. Grant, who would serve as president of LDS Church from 1918 until 1945.

== Geography ==
The central core of Morgan County, the narrow East Canyon valley (now called Morgan Valley), is ringed by mountains. In its southern portion, Main Canyon Creek flows southward from Summit County to join East Canyon Creek, which flows northward from a different portion of Summit County. At their intersection, a dam has been installed to create East Canyon Reservoir and State Park. The combined discharge (now called East Canyon Creek) from the dam flows northwestward to Morgan, where it combines with Deep Creek to discharge into the Weber River, which also flows into the county from Summit and follows Lost Canyon to the Morgan Valley. The now-augmented Weber flows northwestward to Mountain Green, then turns west to exit the county through Weber Canyon. The terrain generally slopes to the north and west, with its highest point, Thurston Peak, at 9,706 ft (2,958 m) ASL. The county has an area of 611 square miles (1,580 km^{2}), of which 609 square miles (1,580 km^{2}) is land and 1.7 square miles (4.4 km^{2}) is water. It is Utah's third-smallest county by land area and smallest by total area.

=== Major highways ===
- Interstate 84
- Utah State Highway U-65
- Utah State Highway U-66
- Utah State Highway U-158
- Utah State Highway U-167

Some county roads accessing the canyons are closed during winters.

=== Adjacent counties ===
- Weber County - north
- Summit County - east
- Salt Lake County - southwest
- Davis County - west
- Rich County - northeast

=== Protected areas ===
- Cache National Forest (part)
- East Canyon State Park
- Lost Creek State Park
- Round Valley Wildlife Management Area
- Wasatch National Forest (part)

== Demographics ==
Historical population
Census	Pop.	Note	%±
1870	1,972		—
1880	1,783		−9.6%
1890	1,780		−0.2%
1900	2,045		14.9%
1910	2,467		20.6%
1920	2,542		3.0%
1930	2,536		−0.2%
1940	2,611		3.0%
1950	2,519		−3.5%
1960	2,837		12.6%
1970	3,983		40.4%
1980	4,917		23.4%
1990	5,528		12.4%
2000	7,129		29.0%
2010	9,469		32.8%
2020	12,295		29.8%
2025 (est.)	13,383	▲	8.8%
US Decennial Census; 1790–1960 1900–1990; 1990–2000 2010 2020

=== 2020 census ===
Morgan County, Utah – racial composition Note: the US Census treats Hispanic/Latino as an ethnic category. This table excludes Latinos from the racial categories and assigns them to a separate category. Hispanics/Latinos may be of any race.
Race (NH = Non-Hispanic)	% 2020	% 2010	% 2000	Pop 2020	Pop 2010	Pop 2000
White alone (NH)	94%	96.1%	97.3%	11,562	9,098	6,937
Black alone (NH)	0.1%	0.2%	0%	12	15	2
American Indian alone (NH)	0.3%	0.1%	0.2%	31	14	13
Asian alone (NH)	0.5%	0.3%	0.1%	57	33	10
Pacific Islander alone (NH)	0%	0.1%	0%	0	10	0
Other race alone (NH)	0.1%	0.1%	0%	9	5	3
Multiracial (NH)	2.3%	0.7%	0.9%	286	68	61
Hispanic/Latino (any race)	2.7%	2.4%	1.4%	338	226	103

According to the 2020 United States census and 2020 American Community Survey, there were 12,295 people in Morgan County with a population density of 20.2 people per square mile (7.8/km^{2}). Among non-Hispanic or Latino people, the racial makeup was 11,562 (94.0%) White, 12 (0.1%) African American, 31 (0.3%) Native American, 57 (0.5%) Asian, 0 (0.0%) Pacific Islander, 9 (0.1%) from other races, and 286 (2.3%) from two or more races. 338 (2.7%) people were Hispanic or Latino. The most commonly picked ancestries were English (47.1%), German (11%), Irish (7.4%), Scottish (5.3%), Danish (4.6%), and Swedish (3%).

There were 6,289 (51.15%) males and 6,006 (48.85%) females, and the population distribution by age was 4,299 (35.0%) under the age of 18, 6,441 (52.4%) from 18 to 64, and 1,555 (12.6%) who were at least 65 years old. The median age was 33.6 years.

There were 3,574 households in Morgan County with an average size of 3.44 of which 3,084 (86.3%) were families and 490 (13.7%) were non-families. Among all families, 2,783 (77.9%) were married couples, 91 (2.5%) were male householders with no spouse, and 210 (5.9%) were female householders with no spouse. Among all non-families, 428 (12.0%) were a single person living alone and 62 (1.7%) were two or more people living together. 1,670 (46.7%) of all households had children under the age of 18. 3,176 (88.9%) of households were owner-occupied while 398 (11.1%) were renter-occupied.

The median income for a Morgan County household was $100,408 and the median family income was $101,572, with a per-capita income of $34,280. The median income for males that were full-time employees was $87,961 and for females $46,484. 1.7% of the population and 1.0% of families were below the poverty line.

In terms of education attainment, out of the 6,695 people in Morgan County 25 years or older, 145 (2.2%) had not completed high school, 1,350 (20.2%) had a high school diploma or equivalency, 2,630 (39.3%) had some college or associate degree, 1,548 (23.1%) had a bachelor's degree, and 1,022 (15.3%) had a graduate or professional degree.

== Politics and government ==
Morgan County traditionally votes Republican. In only one national election since 1948 has the county selected the Democratic Party candidate (as of 2024).

State elected offices
Position	District	Name	Affiliation	First elected
Senate	18	F. Ann Millner	Republican	2014
Senate	19	John D. Johnson	Republican	2020
House of Representatives	53	Kera Birkeland	Republican	2020
Board of Education	1	Jennie Earl	Nonpartisan	2018

United States presidential election results for Morgan County, Utah
Year	Republican		Democratic		Third party(ies)	
Year	No.	%	No.	%	No.	%
1896	138	19.17%	582	80.83%	0	0.00%
1900	391	51.72%	363	48.02%	2	0.26%
1904	492	57.28%	315	36.67%	52	6.05%
1908	494	58.19%	306	36.04%	49	5.77%
1912	318	36.59%	233	26.81%	318	36.59%
1916	464	48.54%	484	50.63%	8	0.84%
1920	544	57.57%	397	42.01%	4	0.42%
1924	482	54.10%	360	40.40%	49	5.50%
1928	513	53.00%	454	46.90%	1	0.10%
1932	568	48.34%	602	51.23%	5	0.43%
1936	483	39.33%	739	60.18%	6	0.49%
1940	575	45.13%	699	54.87%	0	0.00%
1944	535	44.36%	671	55.64%	0	0.00%
1948	587	46.40%	670	52.96%	8	0.63%
1952	862	64.86%	467	35.14%	0	0.00%
1956	905	67.39%	438	32.61%	0	0.00%
1960	775	55.44%	622	44.49%	1	0.07%
1964	572	40.65%	835	59.35%	0	0.00%
1968	1,020	59.89%	551	32.35%	132	7.75%
1972	1,456	71.51%	363	17.83%	217	10.66%
1976	1,356	62.95%	701	32.54%	97	4.50%
1980	1,985	81.52%	373	15.32%	77	3.16%
1984	1,934	79.59%	481	19.79%	15	0.62%
1988	1,889	73.59%	647	25.20%	31	1.21%
1992	1,339	45.54%	520	17.69%	1,081	36.77%
1996	1,659	57.05%	859	29.54%	390	13.41%
2000	2,464	77.70%	553	17.44%	154	4.86%
2004	3,301	85.94%	472	12.29%	68	1.77%
2008	3,311	79.06%	689	16.45%	188	4.49%
2012	4,114	89.49%	403	8.77%	80	1.74%
2016	3,188	61.05%	577	11.05%	1,457	27.90%
2020	5,181	79.56%	1,086	16.68%	245	3.76%
2024	5,300	78.40%	1,256	18.58%	204	3.02%

== Communities ==
=== Cities ===
- Morgan (county seat)

=== Census-designated places ===
- Enterprise
- Mountain Green

=== Unincorporated places ===
- Croydon
- Littleton
- Milton
- Peterson
- Porterville
- Richville
- Stoddard
- Taggarts
- Whites Crossing

=== Ghost towns ===
- Devils Slide

== See also ==
- List of counties in Utah
- National Register of Historic Places listings in Morgan County, Utah
