= Morgan, Utah =

City and county seat in Utah, United States

- City
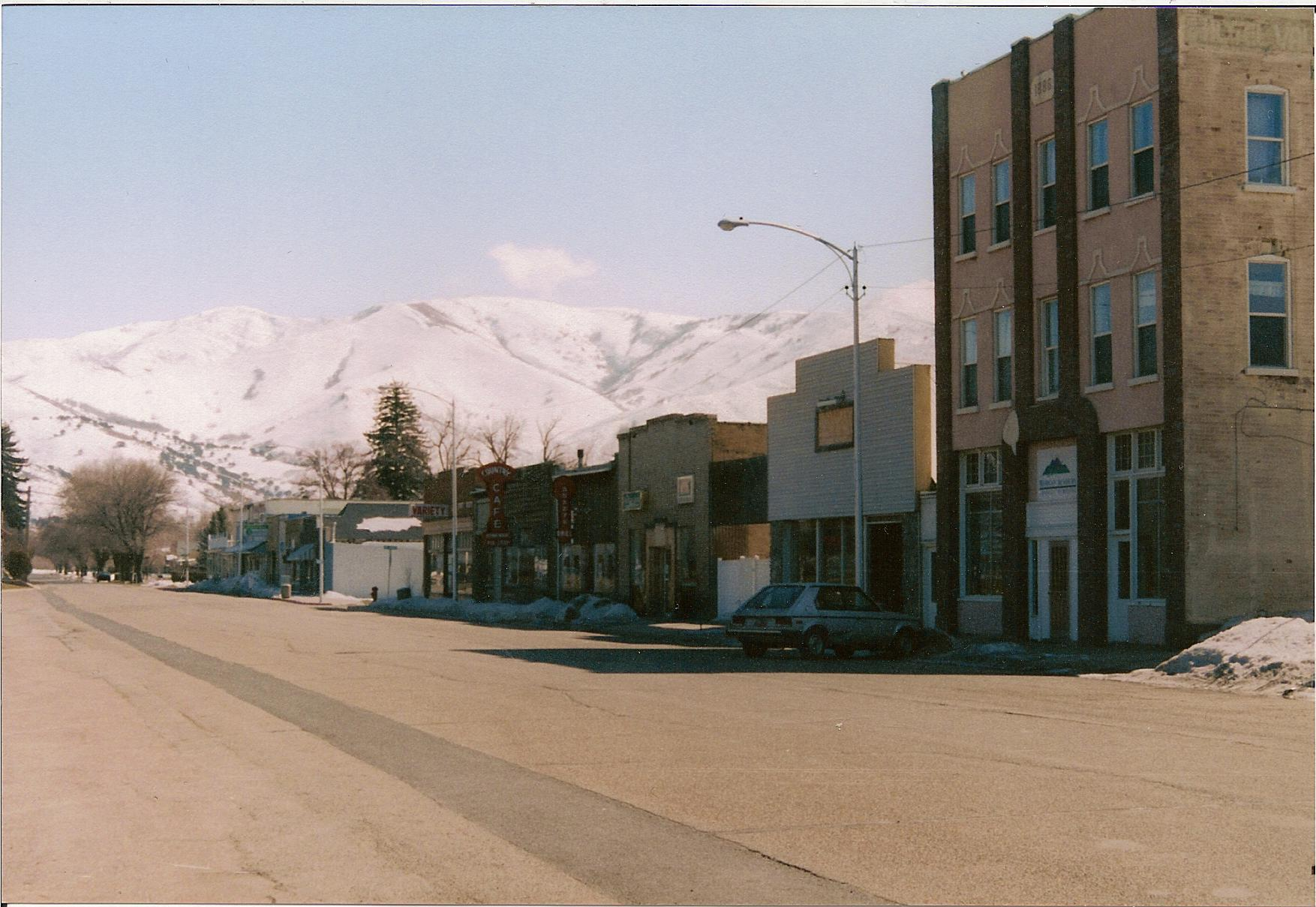
- Morgan's Old Commercial Street, March 2008

- Location in Morgan County and the state of Utah
- Coordinates: 41°2′28″N 111°40′34″W
- Country: United States
- State: Utah
- County: Morgan
- Settled: 1860
- Named for: Jedediah Morgan Grant

Government
  - Mayor: Steve Gale

Area
  - Total: 2.97 sq mi (7.68 km^{2})
  - Land: 2.97 sq mi (7.68 km^{2})
  - Water: 0 sq mi (0.00 km^{2})
- Elevation: 5,069 ft (1,545 m)

Population (2020)
  - Total: 4,071
  - Density: 1,441.6/sq mi (556.59/km^{2})
- Time zone: UTC−7 (Mountain (MST))
  - Summer (DST): UTC−6 (MDT)
- ZIP code: 84050
- Area codes: 385, 801
- FIPS code: 49-51910
- GNIS feature ID: 1430488
- Website: Official website

Morgan is a city in and the county seat of Morgan County, Utah, United States. It is part of the Ogden-Clearfield metropolitan area. The area was settled around 1861 and formally incorporated as a city in 1861, and is named after Jedediah Morgan Grant (1816-1856), a leader in the Church of Jesus Christ of Latter-day Saints. As of the 2020 census, the city population was 4,071 people.

== History ==
Morgan's history dates back to around 1861, when North Morgan was settled (it was originally called Mount Joy). The community was named for Jedediah Morgan Grant, an apostle for The Church of Jesus Christ of Latter Day Saints, who helped settle the Morgan Valley and build the first road through Weber Canyon. Eventually, in 1868, the settlements of North Morgan and South Morgan were combined to form the only incorporated city in Morgan County. When the Union Pacific Railroad built tracks through Weber Canyon in 1868-1869, it put Morgan on the map. At one point, it was said Morgan was the "only incorporated city on the Union Pacific line between Ogden and Omaha, Nebraska."

Although Morgan's business district was initially located in South Morgan, when the railroad was built, local businessmen saw an opportunity to take business closer to railroad freight and passenger stations. Commercial Street became Morgan's center of commerce, as many of Morgan's establishments were moved to the west side of the railroad. Commercial Street continues to serve as Morgan's main street and is the focal point of the Morgan Historic District. Early businesses along Commercial Street included a ZCMI store, J.C. Penney, and the First National Bank of Morgan.

The 1989 horror movie Troll 2 was filmed mostly in and around Morgan.

== Geography ==
According to the United States Census Bureau, the city has a total area of 3.2 square miles (8.3 km^{2}), all land. It has a humid continental climate with warm summers (Köppen Dfb). The city is located within Morgan Valley.

=== Climate ===
Climate data for Morgan, Utah (1981–2010)
Month	Jan	Feb	Mar	Apr	May	Jun	Jul	Aug	Sep	Oct	Nov	Dec	Year
Mean daily maximum °F (°C)	35.8 (2.1)	40.8 (4.9)	51.8 (11.0)	60.8 (16.0)	70.6 (21.4)	81.2 (27.3)	90.6 (32.6)	89.0 (31.7)	78.4 (25.8)	65.1 (18.4)	48.1 (8.9)	35.9 (2.2)	62.3 (16.8)
Mean daily minimum °F (°C)	13.3 (−10.4)	16.6 (−8.6)	25.4 (−3.7)	31.7 (−0.2)	38.4 (3.6)	45.1 (7.3)	52.1 (11.2)	50.5 (10.3)	40.7 (4.8)	31.3 (−0.4)	23.0 (−5.0)	13.8 (−10.1)	31.8 (−0.1)
Average precipitation inches (mm)	1.53 (39)	1.57 (40)	1.69 (43)	1.66 (42)	1.86 (47)	1.27 (32)	0.65 (17)	0.76 (19)	1.45 (37)	1.61 (41)	1.79 (45)	1.78 (45)	17.61 (447)
Average snowfall inches (cm)	15.4 (39)	12.5 (32)	6.3 (16)	2.4 (6.1)	0.4 (1.0)	0.0 (0.0)	0.0 (0.0)	0.0 (0.0)	0.2 (0.51)	1.1 (2.8)	8.6 (22)	13.6 (35)	60.3 (153)
Source: NOAA

== Demographics ==
Historical population
Census	Pop.	Note	%±
1870	1,972		—
1880	582		−70.5%
1890	333		−42.8%
1900	600		80.2%
1910	756		26.0%
1920	995		31.6%
1930	953		−4.2%
1940	1,078		13.1%
1950	1,064		−1.3%
1960	1,299		22.1%
1970	1,586		22.1%
1980	1,896		19.5%
1990	2,023		6.7%
2000	2,635		30.3%
2010	3,687		39.9%
2020	4,071		10.4%
U.S. Decennial Census

=== 2020 census ===
As of the 2020 census, Morgan had a population of 4,071. The median age was 30.9 years, with 35.5% of residents under the age of 18 and 12.4% were 65 years of age or older. For every 100 females there were 100.3 males, and for every 100 females age 18 and over there were 97.3 males age 18 and over.

The entire population lived in rural areas, with 0.0% living in urban areas.

There were 1,244 households in Morgan, of which 46.9% had children under the age of 18 living in them. Of all households, 70.3% were married-couple households, 9.0% were households with a male householder and no spouse or partner present, and 18.2% were households with a female householder and no spouse or partner present. About 16.3% of all households were made up of individuals and 8.5% had someone living alone who was 65 years of age or older.

There were 1,285 housing units, of which 3.2% were vacant. The homeowner vacancy rate was 0.4% and the rental vacancy rate was 3.0%.

Racial composition as of the 2020 census
Race	Number	Percent
White	3,833	94.2%
Black or African American	6	0.1%
American Indian and Alaska Native	14	0.3%
Asian	12	0.3%
Native Hawaiian and Other Pacific Islander	2	0.0%
Some other race	28	0.7%
Two or more races	176	4.3%
Hispanic or Latino (of any race)	115	2.8%

=== 2000 census ===
As of the 2000 census, there were 2,635 people, 789 households, and 665 families residing in the city. The population density was 823.8 people per square mile (317.9/km^{2}). There were 822 housing units at an average density of 257.0 per square mile (99.2/km^{2}). The racial makeup of the city was 99.09% White, 0.04% African American, 0.04% Native American, 0.08% Asian, 0.30% from other races, and 0.46% from two or more races. Hispanic or Latino of any race were 0.95% of the population. There were 789 households, out of which 49.9% had children under the age of 18 living with them, 75.2% were married couples living together, 7.1% had a female householder with no husband present, and 15.6% were non-families. 15.0% of all households were made up of individuals, and 8.9% had someone living alone who was 65 years of age or older. The average household size was 3.34 and the average family size was 3.74.

In the city, the population was spread out, with 37.2% under the age of 18, 10.1% from 18 to 24, 25.1% from 25 to 44, 16.8% from 45 to 64, and 10.7% who were 65 years of age or older. The median age was 27 years. For every 100 females, there were 99.2 males. For every 100 females age 18 and over, there were 93.0 males.

The median income for a household in the city was $47,716, and the median income for a family was $53,125. Males had a median income of $42,143 versus $23,011 for females. The per capita income for the city was $16,260. About 2.0% of families and 3.4% of the population were below the poverty line, including 2.6% of those under age 18 and 3.4% of those age 65 or over.

== See also ==
- List of cities and towns in Utah
- Browning Arms Company, headquartered in the nearby unincorporated community of Mountain Green.
