= National Register of Historic Places listings in Weber County, Utah =

Location of Weber County in Utah

This is a list of the National Register of Historic Places listings in Weber County, Utah.

This is intended to be a complete list of the properties and districts on the National Register of Historic Places in Weber County, Utah, United States. Latitude and longitude coordinates are provided for many National Register properties and districts; these locations may be seen together in a map.

There are 71 properties and districts listed on the National Register in the county. Another 6 properties were once listed on the Register but have been removed.

This National Park Service list is complete through NPS recent listings posted July 31, 2026.

== Current listings ==
	Name on the Register	Image	Date listed	Location	City or town	Description
1	American Can Company of Utah Building Complex	American Can Company of Utah Building Complex	November 16, 2005 (#05001303)	2030 Lincoln Ave. 41°13′49″N 111°58′28″W	Ogden	
2	Arvondor Apartments	Arvondor Apartments	December 31, 1987 (#87002156)	823 23rd St. 41°13′28″N 111°57′27″W	Ogden	
3	Aultorest Memorial Park Historic District	Aultorest Memorial Park Historic District	April 10, 2023 (#100008813)	836 36th St. 41°11′52″N 111°57′31″W	Ogden	
4	Avelan Apartments	Avelan Apartments	December 31, 1987 (#87002157)	449 27th St. 41°12′58″N 111°58′07″W	Ogden	
5	Avon Apartments	Avon Apartments	December 31, 1987 (#87002158)	961 25th St. 41°13′13″N 111°57′14″W	Ogden	
6	Barnhart Apartments	Barnhart Apartments	December 31, 1987 (#87002159)	336 27th St. 41°13′01″N 111°58′17″W	Ogden	
7	Gustav Becker House	Gustav Becker House	July 21, 1977 (#77001327)	2408 Van Buren Ave. 41°13′21″N 111°57′00″W	Ogden	
8	Ben Lomond Hotel Garage	Ben Lomond Hotel Garage	August 28, 2012 (#12000591)	455 25th St. 41°13′14″N 111°58′08″W	Ogden	
9	Bigelow-Ben Lomond Hotel	Bigelow-Ben Lomond Hotel	April 19, 1990 (#90000637)	2510 Washington Boulevard; 41°13′14″N 111°58′10″W	Ogden	
10	George Walter Jr. and Isabelle Bramwell House		July 8, 2024 (#100010536)	4442 W 2350 North; 41°18′03″N 112°05′12″W	Plain City	
11	Browning Apartments	Browning Apartments	December 19, 1985 (#85003200)	2703 Washington Boulevard; 41°12′58″N 111°58′13″W	Ogden	
12	John Moses Browning House	John Moses Browning House	April 24, 1973 (#73001863)	505 27th St. 41°12′58″N 111°58′00″W	Ogden	Home of John Browning
13	Kit Carson Cross		April 17, 2024 (#100010261)	Fremont Island	Hooper	Incorrectly listed on the National Register in Utah County.
14	Congregation B'rith Sholem Synagogue	Congregation B'rith Sholem Synagogue	June 27, 1985 (#85001394)	2750 Grant Ave. 41°12′56″N 111°58′21″W	Ogden	
15	Charles W. Cross House	Charles W. Cross House	July 12, 1984 (#84002434)	451 17th St. 41°14′10″N 111°58′05″W	Ogden	
16	John L. and Elizabeth Dalton House	John L. and Elizabeth Dalton House	March 11, 1987 (#86003659)	2622 Madison Ave. 41°13′05″N 111°57′41″W	Ogden	
17	Devil's Gate-Weber Hydroelectric Power Plant Historic District	Devil's Gate-Weber Hydroelectric Power Plant Historic District	April 20, 1989 (#89000276)	I-84 east of its junction with US-89, in Weber Canyon; 41°08′18″N 111°52′02″W	Uintah vicinity	
18	John F. and Lillia Dumke House	John F. and Lillia Dumke House	February 14, 2007 (#07000078)	1607 Kiesel Ave. 41°14′19″N 111°58′17″W	Ogden	
19	Eccles Avenue Historic District	Eccles Avenue Historic District	December 12, 1976 (#76001840)	Bounded by 25th and 26th Sts. and Van Buren and Jackson Aves. 41°13′10″N 111°57′05″W	Ogden	
20	Eccles Building	Eccles Building	July 14, 1982 (#82004187)	385 24th St. 41°13′22″N 111°58′10″W	Ogden	
21	Bertha Eccles Community Art Center	Bertha Eccles Community Art Center	May 14, 1971 (#71000865)	2580 Jefferson Ave. 41°13′07″N 111°57′50″W	Ogden	
22	El Monte Golf Course Clubhouse	El Monte Golf Course Clubhouse	April 1, 1985 (#85000823)	1300 Valley Dr. 41°14′01″N 111°56′40″W	Ogden	
23	Episcopal Church of the Good Shepherd	Episcopal Church of the Good Shepherd	April 3, 1973 (#73001864)	2374 Grant Ave. 41°13′23″N 111°58′19″W	Ogden	
24	Fairview Apartments	Fairview Apartments	December 31, 1987 (#87002161)	579–587 27th St. 41°12′58″N 111°57′55″W	Ogden	
25	Farnsworth Apartments	Farnsworth Apartments	December 31, 1987 (#87002162)	2539 Jefferson Ave. 41°13′11″N 111°57′54″W	Ogden	
26	Valasco Farr House	Valasco Farr House	June 13, 1978 (#78002712)	700 Canyon Rd. 41°14′17″N 111°57′40″W	Ogden	
27	Fern-Marylyn Apartments	Fern-Marylyn Apartments	December 31, 1987 (#87002163)	2579 Adams Ave. 41°13′08″N 111°58′03″W	Ogden	
28	Flowers Apartments	Flowers Apartments	December 31, 1987 (#87002166)	2681 Madison Ave. 41°13′01″N 111°57′43″W	Ogden	
29	Fontenelle Apartments	Fontenelle Apartments	December 31, 1987 (#87002167)	2465–2475 Monroe Ave. 41°13′16″N 111°57′32″W	Ogden	
30	Geffas Apartments	Geffas Apartments	December 31, 1987 (#87002168)	2675 Grant Ave. 41°13′01″N 111°58′23″W	Ogden	
31	Miles Goodyear Cabin	Miles Goodyear Cabin	February 24, 1971 (#71000866)	2104 Lincoln Ave. 41°13′44″N 111°58′32″W	Ogden	The first known permanent home in Utah, built circa 1841 by Miles Goodyear. Previously at 2148 Grant Ave., moved in December 2012
32	Grant Steam Locomotive No. 223	Grant Steam Locomotive No. 223	May 23, 1979 (#79002501)	Union Station; 41°13′20″N 111°58′47″W	Ogden	Moved from a previous location in Salt Lake City
33	Helms Apartments	Helms Apartments	December 31, 1987 (#87002169)	2248–2250 Jefferson Ave. 41°13′33″N 111°57′50″W	Ogden	
34	Hillcrest Apartments	Hillcrest Apartments	December 31, 1987 (#87002170)	2485 Monroe Ave. 41°13′15″N 111°57′33″W	Ogden	
35	Jefferson Avenue Historic District	Jefferson Avenue Historic District	September 25, 1998 (#98001214)	Roughly along Jefferson Ave. between 25th and 27th Sts. 41°13′07″N 111°57′54″W	Ogden	
36	La Frantz Apartments	La Frantz Apartments	December 31, 1987 (#87002172)	461 27th St. 41°12′58″N 111°58′07″W	Ogden	
37	Ladywood Apartments	Ladywood Apartments	December 31, 1987 (#87002171)	670–690 26th St. 41°13′07″N 111°57′43″W	Ogden	
38	Lower 25th Street Historic District	Lower 25th Street Historic District	January 31, 1978 (#78003260)	25th St. between Wall and Grant Aves.; also 2522 Wall Ave.; also 2471 Grant Ave. 41°13′08″N 111°58′33″W	Ogden	Second and third addresses represent separate boundary increases
39	Madison Elementary School	Madison Elementary School	February 19, 1982 (#82004188)	2434 Madison Ave. 41°13′18″N 111°57′38″W	Ogden	
40	Don Maguire Duplex	Don Maguire Duplex	February 26, 1979 (#79002521)	549–551 25th St. 41°13′14″N 111°57′58″W	Ogden	
41	McGregor Apartments	McGregor Apartments	December 31, 1987 (#87002173)	802–810 25th St. 41°13′16″N 111°57′30″W	Ogden	
42	Mountain View Auto Court	Mountain View Auto Court	November 24, 1987 (#87002063)	563 W. 24th St. 41°13′22″N 111°59′26″W	Ogden	
43	New Brigham Hotel	New Brigham Hotel	June 14, 1979 (#79002522)	2402–2410 Wall Ave. 41°13′21″N 111°58′41″W	Ogden	
44	North Ogden Baseball Field and Grandstand		March 23, 2026 (#100012843)	450 E 2750 N 41°18′34″N 111°57′57″W	North Ogden	
45	Ogden Central Bench Historic District	Ogden Central Bench Historic District	July 22, 2005 (#03000055)	20th St to 30th St., Adams Ave. to Harrison Boulevard; 41°13′07″N 111°57′30″W	Ogden	
46	Ogden Fire Station No. 2	Ogden Fire Station No. 2	January 21, 2020 (#100004879)	1585 25th St. 41°13′13″N 111°56′15″W	Ogden	
47	Ogden High School	Ogden High School	June 7, 1983 (#83003201)	2828 Harrison Boulevard; 41°12′47″N 111°56′46″W	Ogden	
48	Ogden Union Station	Ogden Union Station	April 11, 1971 (#71000867)	25th St. at Wall Ave.; also 2501 Wall Ave. 41°13′14″N 111°58′43″W	Ogden	2501 Wall Ave. represents a boundary increase
49	Ogden Union Stockyard Exchange Building	Ogden Union Stockyard Exchange Building	July 21, 2015 (#15000452)	600 W. Exchange Rd. 41°13′31″N 111°59′31″W	Ogden	
50	Ogden/Weber Municipal Building	Ogden/Weber Municipal Building	June 7, 1983 (#83003202)	2541 Washington Boulevard; 41°13′11″N 111°58′13″W	Ogden	
51	Augustus B. Patton House	Augustus B. Patton House	February 19, 1982 (#82004189)	1506 24th St. 41°13′21″N 111°56′21″W	Ogden	
52	Pearl Billiard Parlor-The Club		April 9, 2026 (#100012894)	124 25th Street; 41°13′15″N 111°58′41″W	Ogden	
53	Peery Apartments	Peery Apartments	December 31, 1987 (#87002174)	2461 Adams Ave. 41°13′16″N 111°58′03″W	Ogden	
54	Peery's Egyptian Theatre	Peery's Egyptian Theatre	December 12, 1978 (#78002714)	2439 Washington Boulevard; 41°13′19″N 111°58′15″W	Ogden	
55	Pioneer Hydroelectric Power Plant Historic District	Pioneer Hydroelectric Power Plant Historic District	April 21, 1989 (#89000275)	12th St. at Canyon Rd. 41°14′38″N 111°56′46″W	Ogden	
56	Rushmer Building	Rushmer Building	June 13, 2022 (#100007109)	2434–2436 Washington Blvd. 41°13′19″N 111°58′13″W	Ogden	
57	Scowcroft Warehouse	Scowcroft Warehouse	November 30, 1978 (#78002715)	105 23rd St. 41°13′29″N 111°58′39″W	Ogden	
58	Heber Scowcroft House	Heber Scowcroft House	December 13, 1991 (#91001818)	795 24th St. 41°13′18″N 111°57′31″W	Ogden	
59	William D. Skeen House	William D. Skeen House	August 9, 1982 (#82004191)	2419 N. 4500 West; 41°18′16″N 112°05′08″W	Plain City	
60	Dennis A. Smyth House	Dennis A. Smyth House	February 11, 1982 (#82004190)	635 25th St. 41°13′13″N 111°57′47″W	Ogden	
61	Stone Farmstead	Stone Farmstead	July 6, 2004 (#04000676)	301 W. 2nd St. 41°15′33″N 111°59′01″W	Ogden	
62	Sunnyfield Barn	Sunnyfield Barn	March 20, 2024 (#100010090)	2103 N 5500 E 41°17′50″N 111°48′58″W	Eden	Improvement Era dairy barn
63	US Forest Service Building	US Forest Service Building	May 24, 2006 (#06000432)	507 25th St. 41°13′13″N 111°58′00″W	Ogden	
64	U.S. Post Office and Courthouse	U.S. Post Office and Courthouse	July 26, 1979 (#79002523)	298 W. 24th St. 41°13′23″N 111°58′23″W	Ogden	
65	Upton Apartments	Upton Apartments	December 31, 1987 (#87002176)	2300–2314 Jefferson Ave. 41°13′28″N 111°57′50″W	Ogden	
66	Utah School for the Deaf and Blind Boys' Dormitory	Utah School for the Deaf and Blind Boys' Dormitory	April 1, 1985 (#85000824)	846 20th St. 41°13′52″N 111°57′25″W	Ogden	No longer extant per Google Street View.
67	Andrew J. Warner House	Andrew J. Warner House	December 13, 1977 (#77001328)	726 25th St. 41°13′16″N 111°57′37″W	Ogden	
68	Weber County Main Library	Weber County Main Library	September 13, 2019 (#100004395)	2464 Jefferson Ave. 41°13′16″N 111°57′54″W	Ogden	
69	Weber River Railroad Bridge	Weber River Railroad Bridge	April 6, 2015 (#15000134)	0.5 miles (0.80 km) west of Union Station along Exchange Rd. 41°13′24″N 111°59′18″W	Ogden	
70	Weber Stake Relief Society Building	Weber Stake Relief Society Building	February 13, 1989 (#88003438)	2104 Lincoln Ave. 41°13′44″N 111°58′32″W	Ogden	Houses the Weber County DUP Museum. Originally at 2148 Grant Ave., moved on January 24, 2012
71	J.M. Wilbur Company Blacksmith Shop	J.M. Wilbur Company Blacksmith Shop	January 17, 2017 (#100000513)	2145 N 5500 E 41°17′50″N 111°48′56″W	Eden	

== Former listings ==
	Name on the Register	Image	Date listed	Date removed	Location	City or town	Description
1	Burch-Taylor Mill		July 14, 1982 (#82004186)	May 15, 2001	4287 Riverdale Rd.	Riverdale	
2	Downing Apartments	Downing Apartments	December 31, 1987 (#87002160)	March 26, 2018	357–359 27th St. 41°12′58″N 111°58′15″W	Ogden	Has been demolished
3	North Ogden Elementary School	North Ogden Elementary School	April 1, 1985 (#85000822)	March 26, 2018	474 E. 2650 North; 41°18′29″N 111°57′55″W	North Ogden	1930s Art Deco building demolished in 2010
4	Rose Apartments	Rose Apartments	December 31, 1987 (#87002175)	March 26, 2018	302–308 27th St. 41°13′01″N 111°58′20″W	Ogden	Has been demolished
5	Shupe-Williams Candy Company Factory		March 30, 1978 (#78002716)	February 21, 2007	2606 Wall Ave.	Ogden	Burned down March 11, 2006.
6	Sidney Stevens House	Sidney Stevens House	December 2, 1977 (#77001326)	March 26, 2018	2593 N. 400 East; 41°18′19″N 111°58′05″W	North Ogden	Has been demolished

== See also ==
- List of National Historic Landmarks in Utah
- National Register of Historic Places listings in Utah
