= Avelan Apartments =

- U.S. National Register of Historic Places
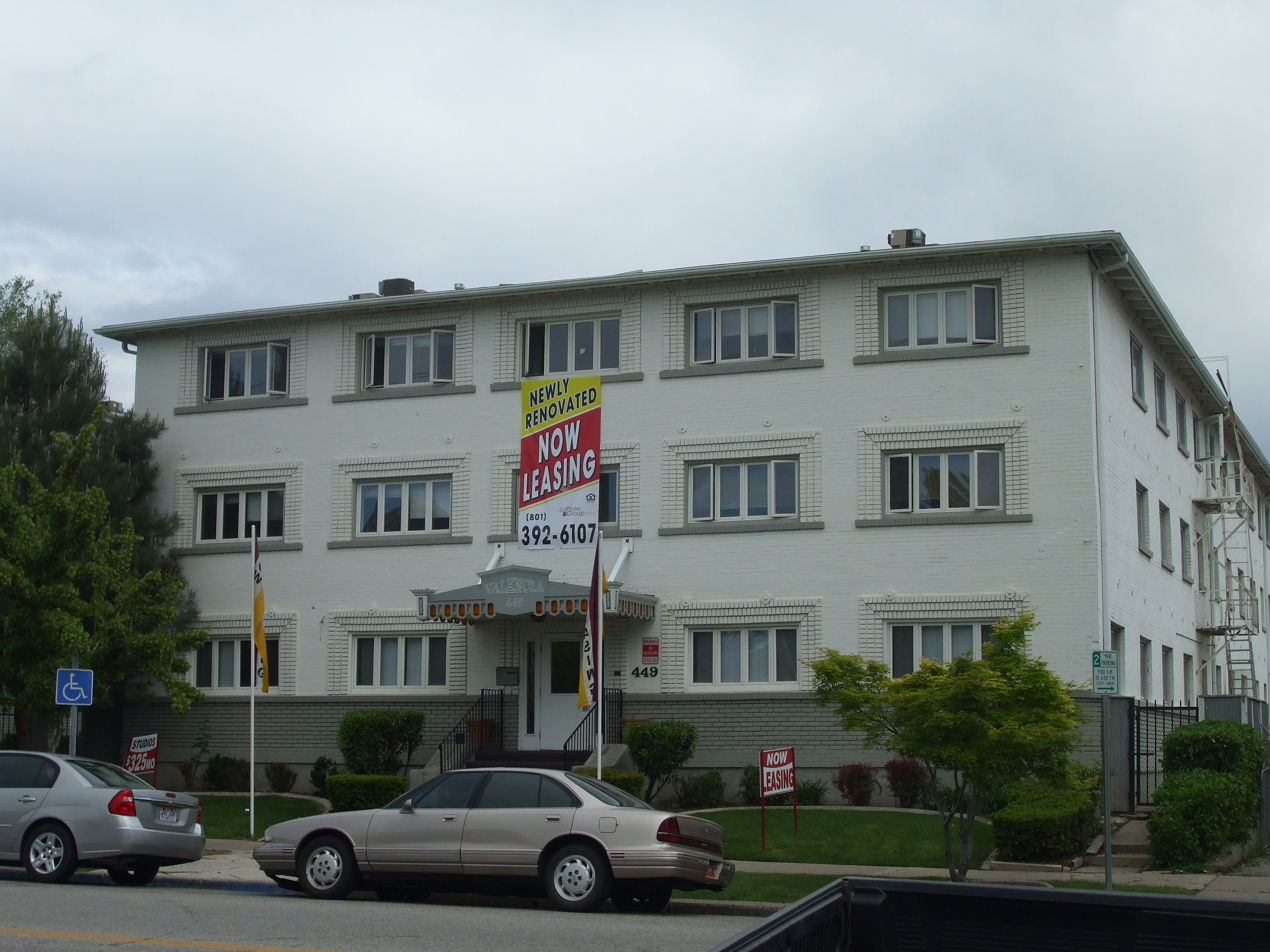
- The building in 2009

- Location within Utah Location within the United States
- Location: 449 Twenty-seventh Street, Ogden, Utah
- Coordinates: 41°12′58″N 111°58′07″W
- Area: less than one acre
- Built: 1921
- Built by: William J. Stephens
- Architectural style: Double-Loaded Corridor
- MPS: Three-Story Apartment Buildings in Ogden, 1908--1928 MPS
- NRHP reference No.: 87002157
- Added to NRHP: December 31, 1987

Avelan Apartments is a historic three-story building in Ogden, Utah. It was built in 1921 for investor William J. Stephens, and named for one of his sons. It is an unusually long, narrow building, with its narrow end to the street. It has 60 apartments.

The building has been listed on the National Register of Historic Places since December 31, 1987.

It is located on the south side of 27th Ave. in Ogden, at number 449, and is adjacent to the similar La Frantz Apartments, also National Register-listed.
