= Fairview Apartments =

Fairview Apartments may refer to:

- Fairview Apartments (Wichita, Kansas), listed on the National Register of Historic Places in Sedgwick County, Kansas
- Fairview Apartments (Ogden, Utah), also listed on the National Register of Historic Places
