= Patton House =

Patton House may refer to:

- Sweetwater Mansion, Florence, AL, also known as the Governor Robert Patton House
- Dave Patton House, Mobile, AL
- Patton House (Wooster, Arkansas)
- Woodall-Patton House and Post Office, Ellaville, GA
- John Patton Log Cabin, Lexington, IL
- Robert Patton House, Covington, KY, listed on the National Register of Historic Places (NRHP)
- Virden-Patton House, Jackson, MS
- Price-Patton-Pettis House, Shubuta, MS, listed on the NRHP
- James "Squire" Patton House, New Windsor, NY
- Griffis-Patton House, Mebane, NC
- Kerr-Patton House, Thompson, NC
- Patton Farm, Phillipsville, NC
- Hamilton and Edith Patton House, Medford, OR, listed on the NRHP
- John E. Patton House, Coalmont, TN, listed on the NRHP
- Patton-Bejach House, Memphis, TN, listed on the NRHP
- Augustus B. Patton House, Ogden, UT
- Patton Mansion, Charlottesville, VA
- Craik-Patton House, Charleston, WV
