= Fern-Marylyn Apartments =

- Fern--Marylyn Apartments
- U.S. National Register of Historic Places
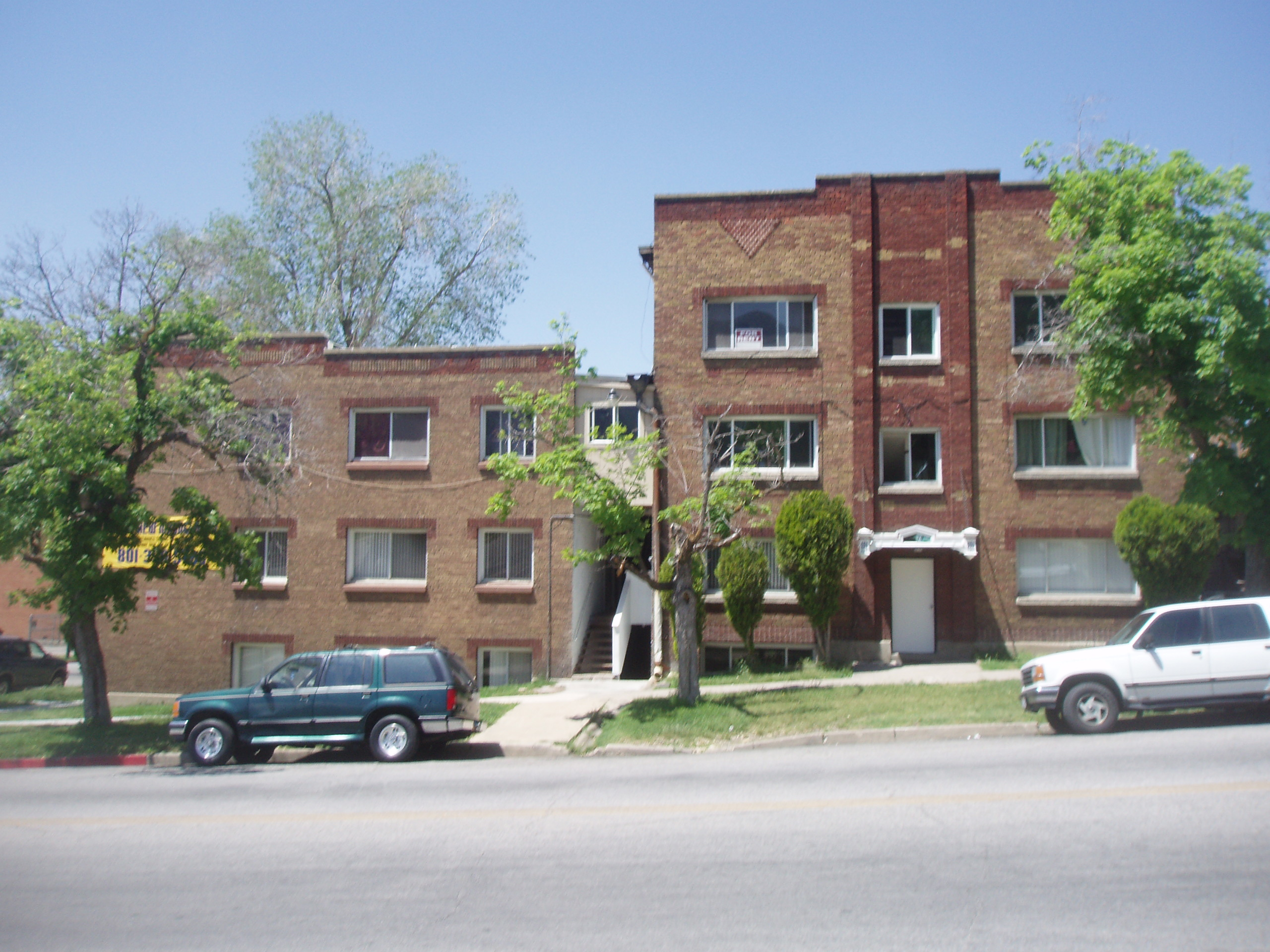
- The building in 2009

- Location within Utah Location within the United States
- Location: 2579 Adams Avenue, Ogden, Utah
- Coordinates: 41°13′08″N 111°58′03″W
- Area: less than one acre
- Built: 1923
- Built by: Stephens Bros. Construction Co.
- Architectural style: Double-Loaded Corridor
- MPS: Three-Story Apartment Buildings in Ogden, 1908--1928 MPS
- NRHP reference No.: 87002163
- Added to NRHP: December 31, 1987

Fern-Marylyn Apartments is a historic apartment complex in Ogden, Utah. It includes two buildings: Marylyn Apartments on the southern side completed in 1923, and Fern Apartments on the northern side completed in 1926. It has been listed on the National Register of Historic Places since December 31, 1987.
