= New Brigham Hotel =

- U.S. National Register of Historic Places
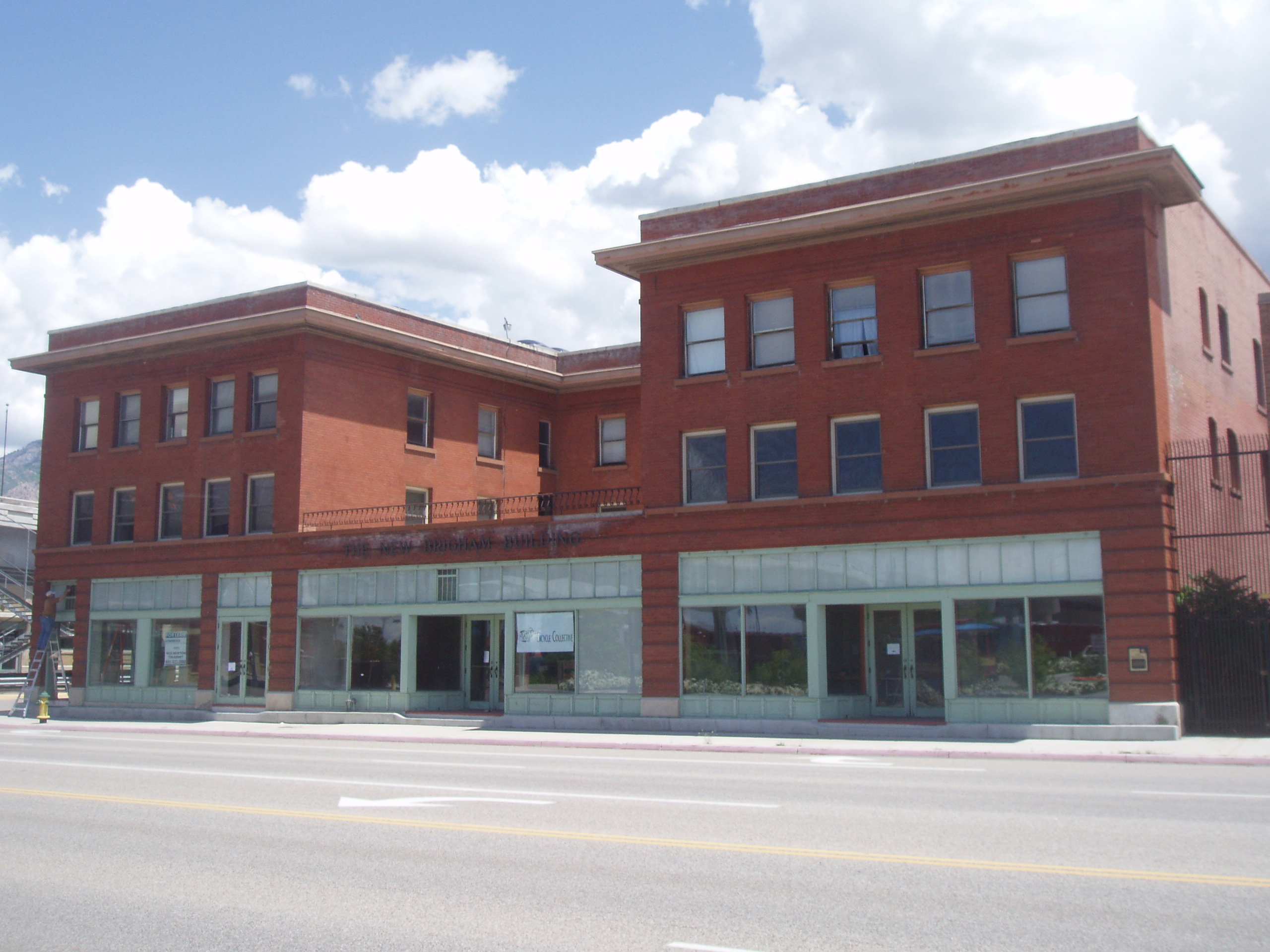
- The hotel in 2009

- Location within Utah Location within the United States
- Location: 2402--2410 Wall Avenue, Ogden, Utah
- Coordinates: 41°13′21″N 111°58′41″W
- Area: less than one acre
- Built: 1913
- Built by: J.L. Eckert Construction Co.
- Architectural style: Chicago, Commercial Style
- NRHP reference No.: 79002522
- Added to NRHP: June 14, 1979

The New Brigham Hotel is a historic three-story hotel building in Ogden, Utah. It was built with red bricks in 1913 by the J.K. Eckert Construction Company, and designed in the Chicago School architectural style. It has been listed on the National Register of Historic Places since June 14, 1979.

It has also been known as The Toone Hotel.
