= Mountain View Auto Court =

- U.S. National Register of Historic Places
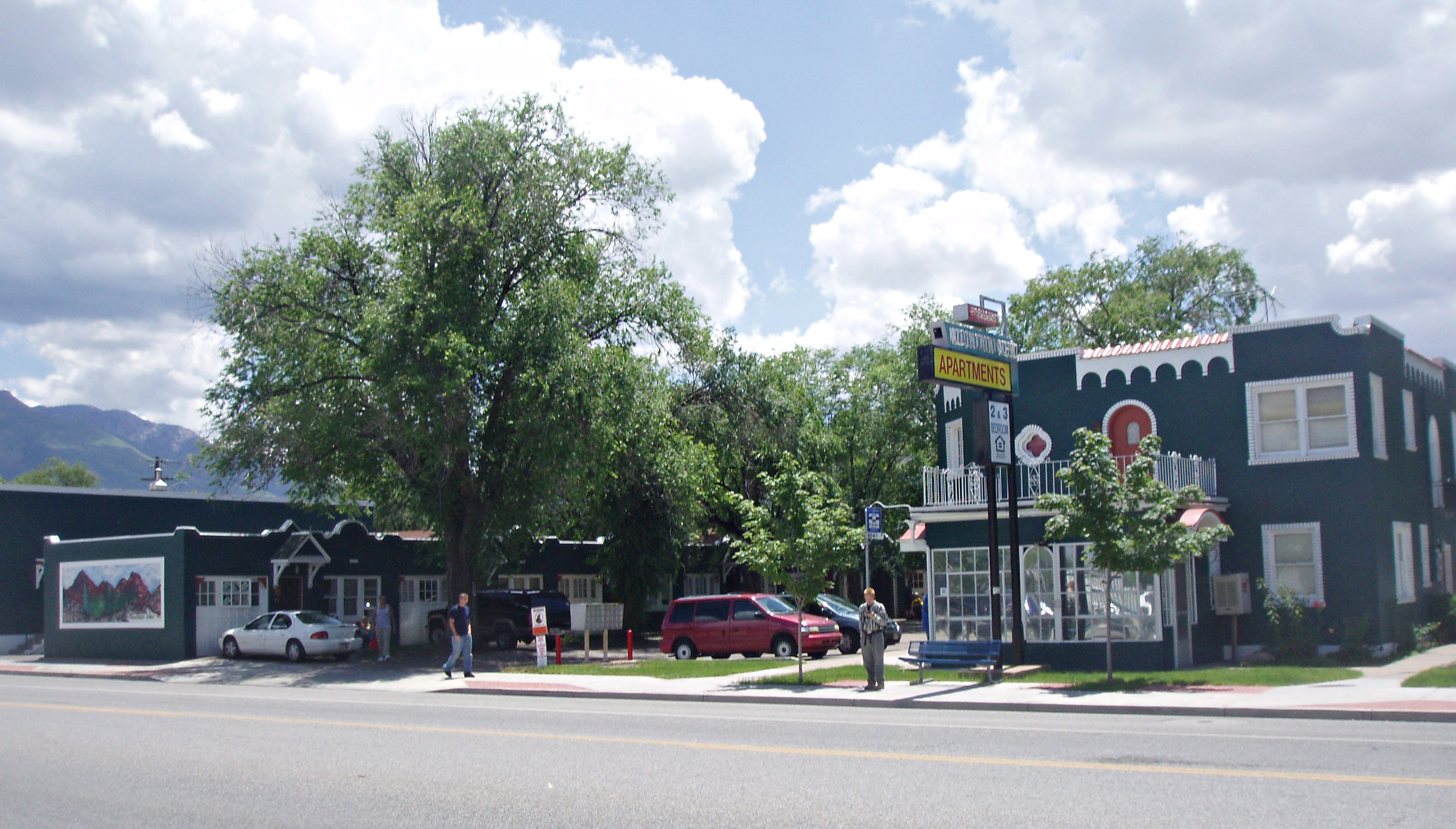
- Mountain View Auto Court, June 2009

- Location within Utah Location within the United States
- Location: 563 West 24th Street; Ogden, Utah
- Coordinates: 41°13′22″N 111°59′26″W
- Area: 1.6 acres (0.65 ha)
- Built: 1931-39
- Architect: Sullivan Arthur Shreeve; George F. Johnson
- Architectural style: Mission/Spanish Revival, Spanish Colonial Revival
- NRHP reference No.: 87002063
- Added to NRHP: November 24, 1987

Mountain View Auto Court (also known as the Mountain View Motel) is a complex of motel buildings in southwestern Ogden, Utah, United States, that is listed on the National Register of Historic Places.

== Description ==
The complex is located at 563 West 24th Street (SR-53) and includes seven structures built or remodelled for motel use between 1931 and 1939. Except for the four houses on the southeast corner, the complex occupies the entirety of the city block between C and B avenues and between West Capitol and West 24th streets. The oldest building was originally constructed in 1926. The complex is significant as the "oldest well-preserved motel in Ogden." The architecture styles reflected include Spanish Colonial Revival and Mission/Spanish Revival.

The motel was added to the National Register of Historic Places November 24, 1987. Although the listing includes multiple structures, it is not considered a historic district.

== See also ==
- National Register of Historic Places listings in Weber County, Utah
