= Dennis A. Smyth House =

Historical house in Ogden, Utah, United States

- U.S. National Register of Historic Places
- U.S. Historic district – Contributing property
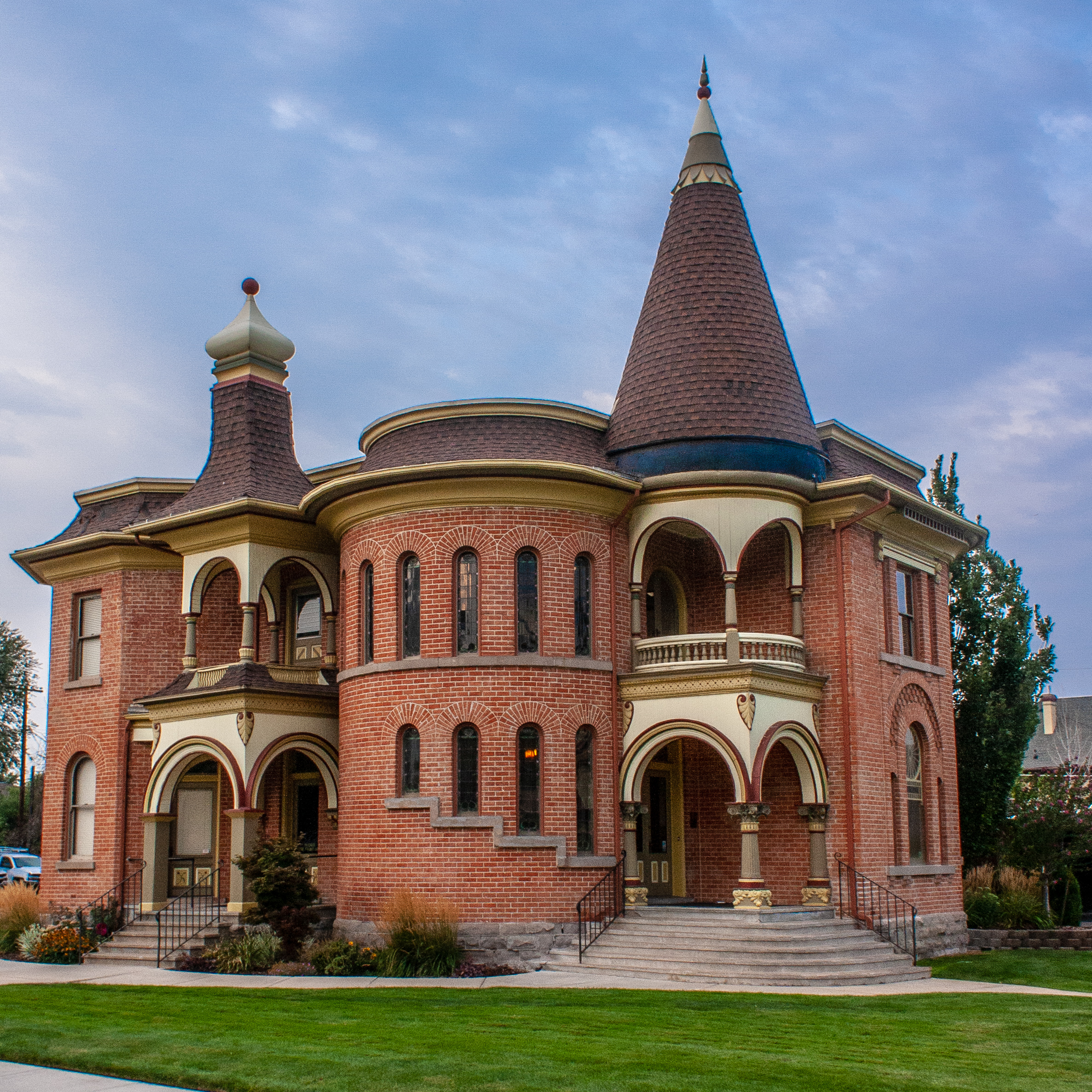
- The Dennis A. Smyth House, August 2018

- Location within Utah Location within the United States Location within the United States
- Location: 635 25th Street; Ogden, Utah; United States
- Coordinates: 41°13′13″N 111°57′47″W
- Area: less than one acre
- Built: 1889
- Architect: S. T. Whitaker
- Architectural style: Second Empire, Exotic Revival, Romanesque Revival
- Part of: Ogden Central Bench Historic District (ID03000055)
- NRHP reference No.: 82004190

Significant dates
- Added to NRHP: February 11, 1982
- Designated CP: July 22, 2005

The Dennis A. Smyth House is a historic house within the Ogden Central Bench Historic District in Ogden, Utah, United States, that is individually listed on the National Register of Historic Places (NRHP).

== Description ==
The house was built in 1889 for Ephraim H. Nye, and it was designed in the Second Empire, Exotic Revival and Romanesque Revival styles by architect S. T. Whitaker. It later belonged to Dennis A. Smyth, an immigrant from Ireland who became a prominent businessman and invited William Howard Taft, the 27th President of the United States, to the house. From 1948 to 1967, the house was a Roman Catholic convent, and it later became a private residence again. It was listed on the NRHP on February 11, 1982.

== See also ==
- National Register of Historic Places listings in Weber County, Utah
