= Ladywood Apartments =

- U.S. National Register of Historic Places
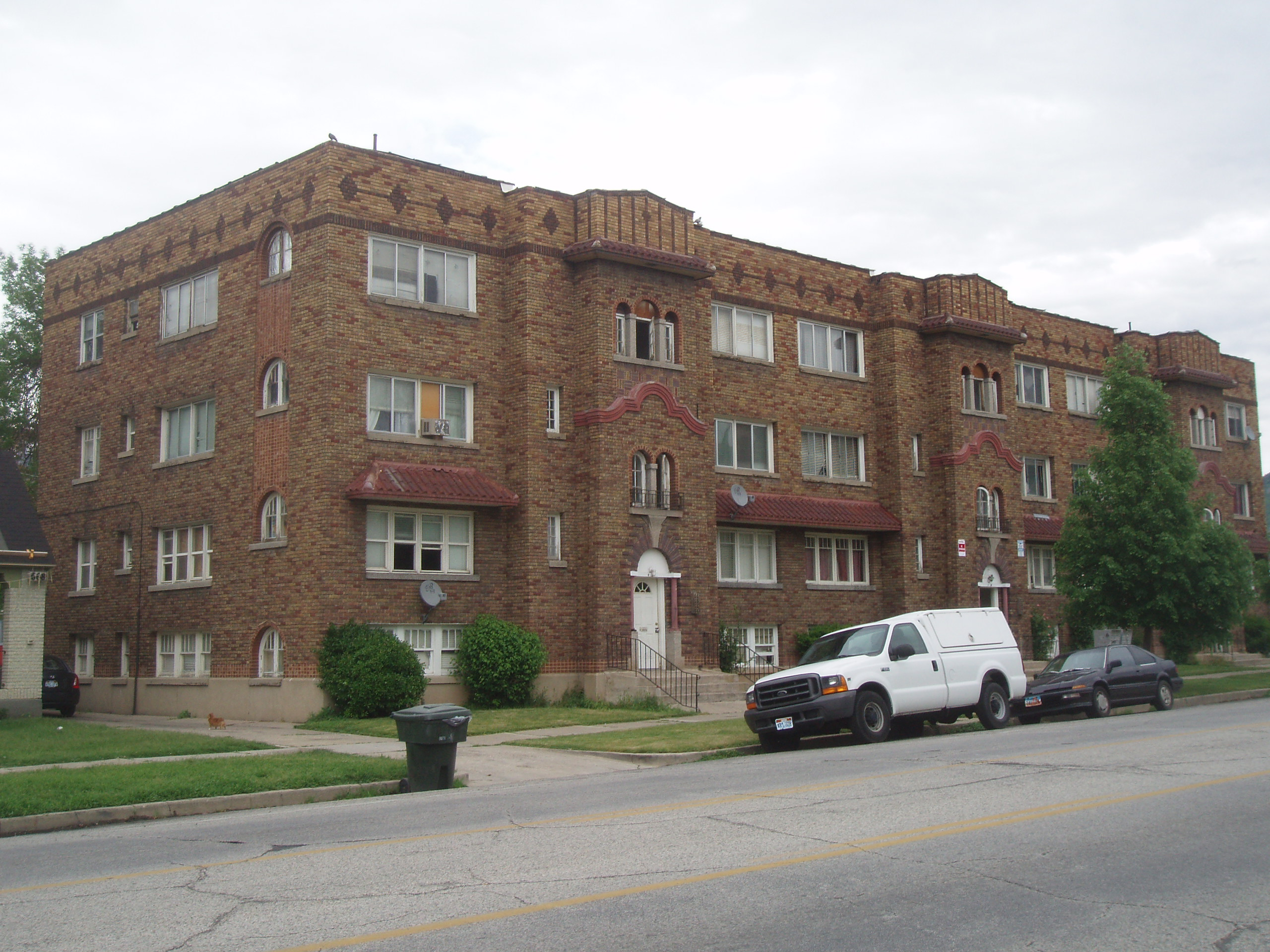
- The building in 2009

- Location within Utah Location within the United States
- Location: 670--690 Twenty-sixth Street, Ogden, Utah
- Coordinates: 41°13′07″N 111°57′43″W
- Area: less than one acre
- Built: 1926
- Built by: Upton Masonry Co.
- Architectural style: Spanish Colonial Revival
- MPS: Three-Story Apartment Buildings in Ogden, 1908--1928 MPS
- NRHP reference No.: 87002171
- Added to NRHP: December 31, 1987

Ladywood Apartments is a historic three-story building in Ogden, Utah. It was built in 1926 by the Upton Masonry Company, whose manager, T.H. Upton, lived in the building, and it was designed in the Spanish Colonial Revival style, possibly by Parkinson & Bergstrom. It has been listed on the National Register of Historic Places since December 31, 1987.
