= Fontenelle Apartments =

- U.S. National Register of Historic Places
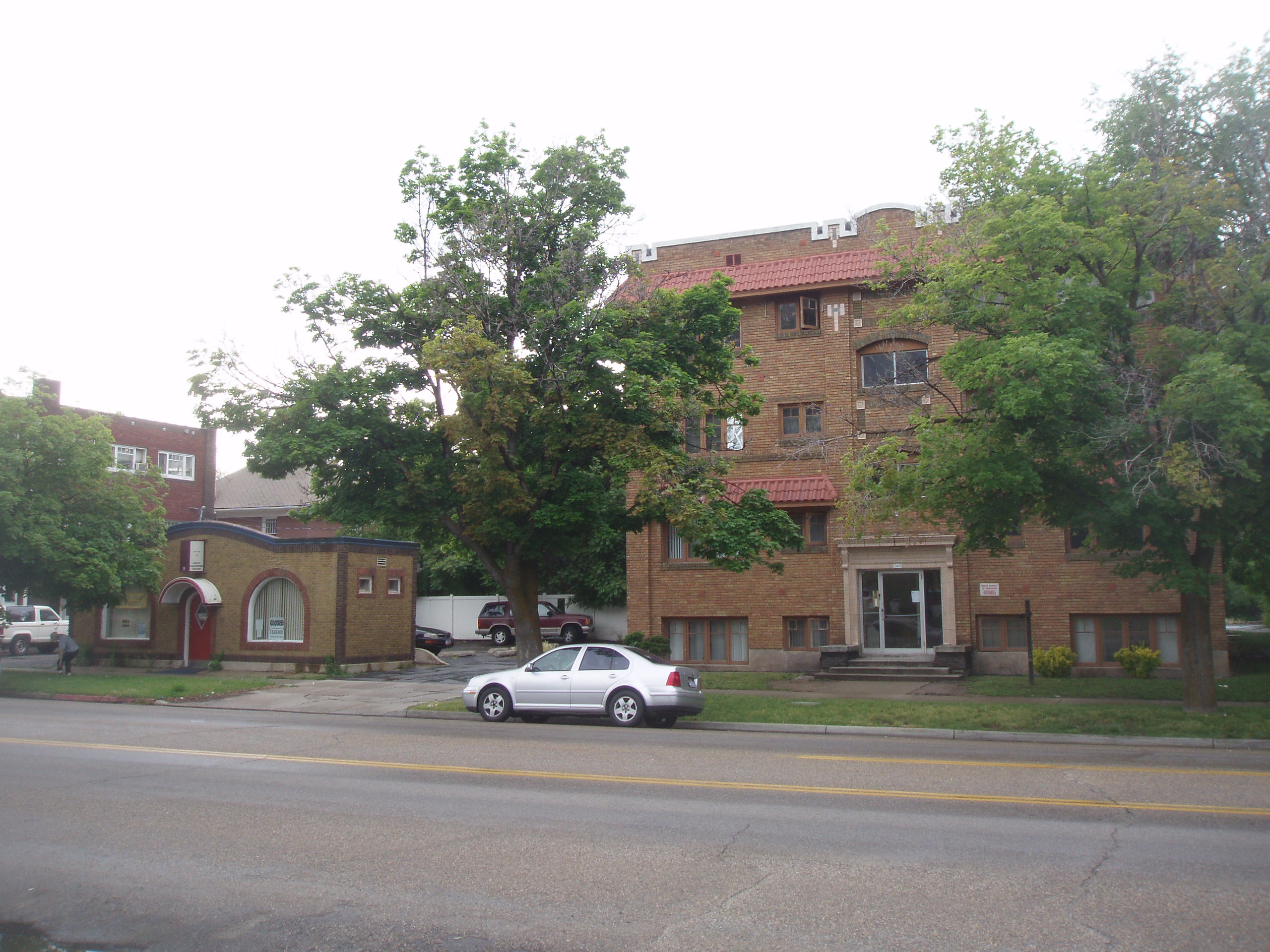
- The building in 2009

- Location within Utah Location within the United States
- Location: 2465--2475 Monroe Avenue, Ogden, Utah
- Coordinates: 41°13′16″N 111°57′32″W
- Area: less than one acre
- Built: 1924
- Built by: McGregor Bros. Construction Co.
- Architectural style: Prairie School, Spanish Colonial Revival
- MPS: Three-Story Apartment Buildings in Ogden, 1908--1928 MPS
- NRHP reference No.: 87002167
- Added to NRHP: December 31, 1987

Fontenelle Apartments is a historic three-story building in Ogden, Utah. It was built in 1924-1927 by the McGregor Bros. Construction Company, and designed in the Spanish Colonial Revival and Prairie School styles. It has been listed on the National Register of Historic Places since December 31, 1987.
