= McGregor Apartments =

Historic apartment complex in Ogden, Utah, United States

- U.S. National Register of Historic Places
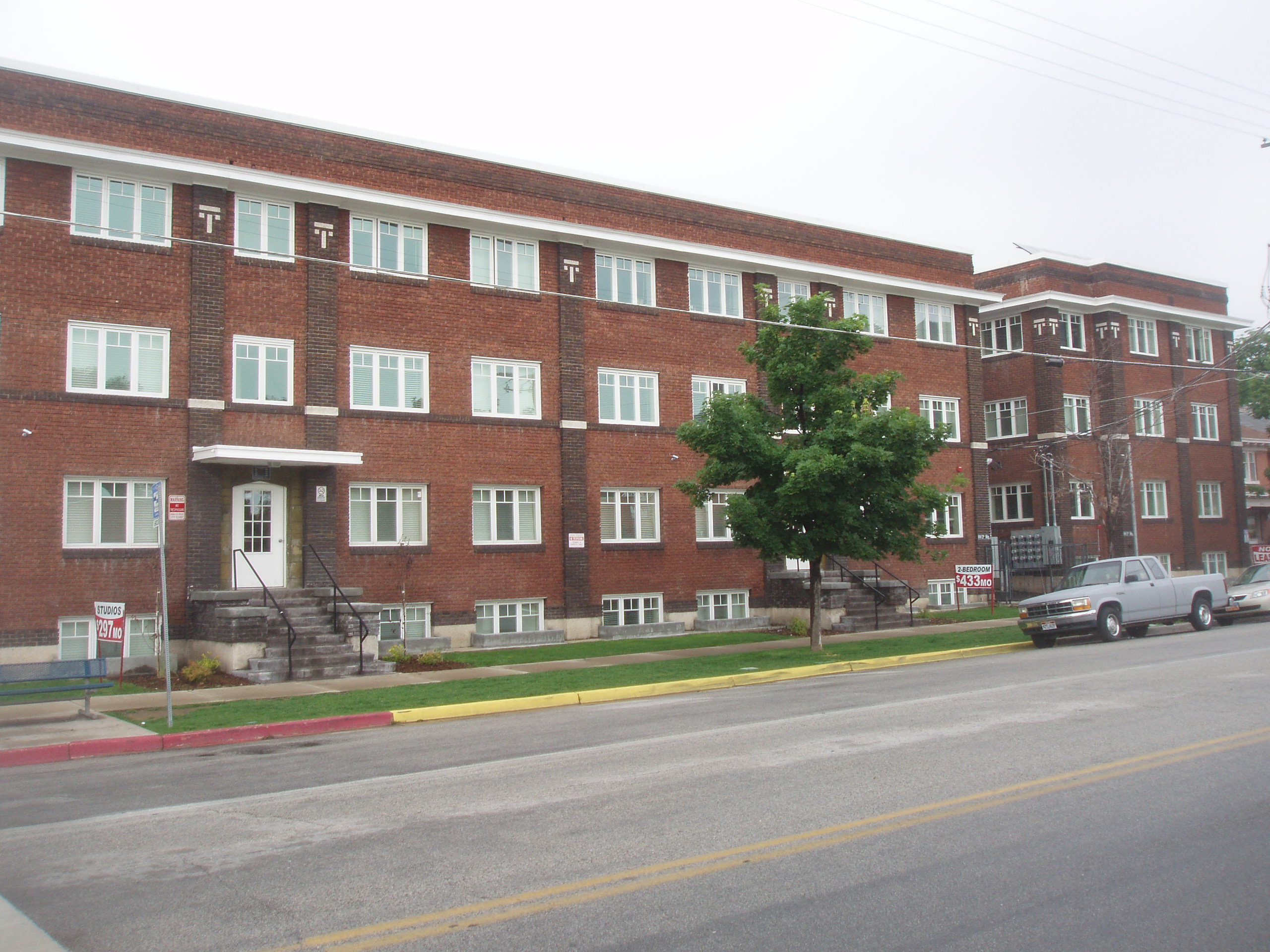
- The apartment in June 2009

- Location within Utah Location within the United States
- Location: 802--810 Twenty-fifth Street, Ogden, Utah
- Coordinates: 41°13′16″N 111°57′30″W
- Area: less than one acre
- Built: 1924
- Built by: McGregor Bros. Construction
- Architectural style: Prairie School
- MPS: Three-Story Apartment Buildings in Ogden, 1908--1928 MPS
- NRHP reference No.: 87002173
- Added to NRHP: December 31, 1987

McGregor Apartments is a historic apartment complex comprising three buildings in Ogden, Utah, United States, that is listed on the National Register of Historic Places (NRHP).

== Description ==
The apartments were built between 1924 and 1926 by McGregor Bros. Construction, and designed in the Prairie School style. They are each three-story high. The complex been listed on the National Register of Historic Places since December 31, 1987.

== See also ==
- National Register of Historic Places listings in Weber County, Utah
