= Avon Apartments =

- U.S. National Register of Historic Places
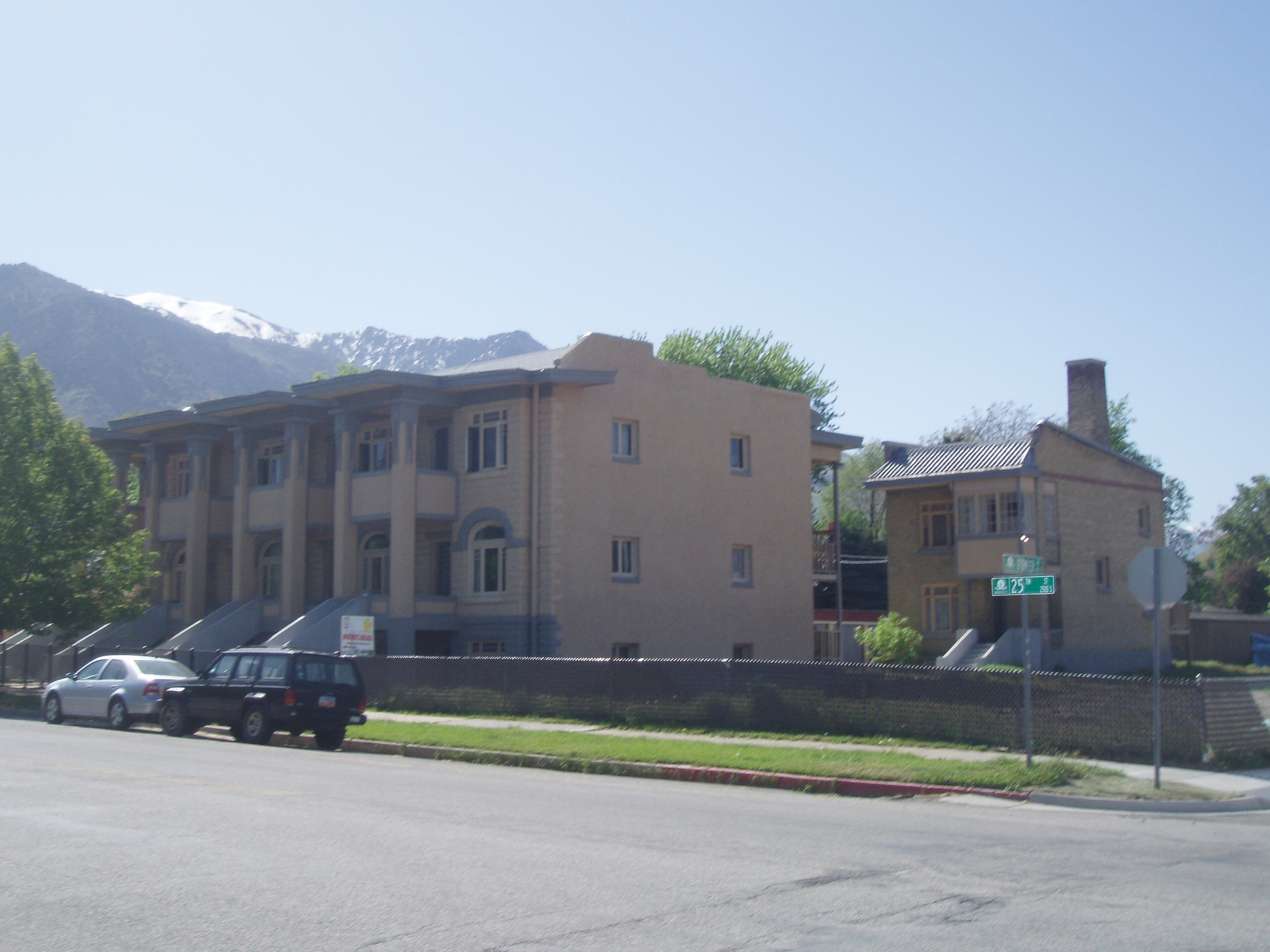
- The building in 2009

- Location within Utah Location within the United States
- Location: 961 Twenty-fifth Street, Ogden, Utah
- Coordinates: 41°13′13″N 111°57′14″W
- Area: less than one acre
- Built: 1908
- Architectural style: Prairie School, Romanesque Revival
- MPS: Three-Story Apartment Buildings in Ogden, 1908--1928 MPS
- NRHP reference No.: 87002158
- Added to NRHP: December 31, 1987

Avon Apartments is a historic three-story building in Ogden, Utah. It was built in 1908 for investor Ella Georgeanna Lewis Van Why, and designed in the Romanesque Revival style. It was purchased by Dr. Edward I. Rich in 1914, and he added front porches designed in the Prairie School style. It has been listed on the National Register of Historic Places since December 31, 1987.
