= Upton Apartments =

- U.S. National Register of Historic Places
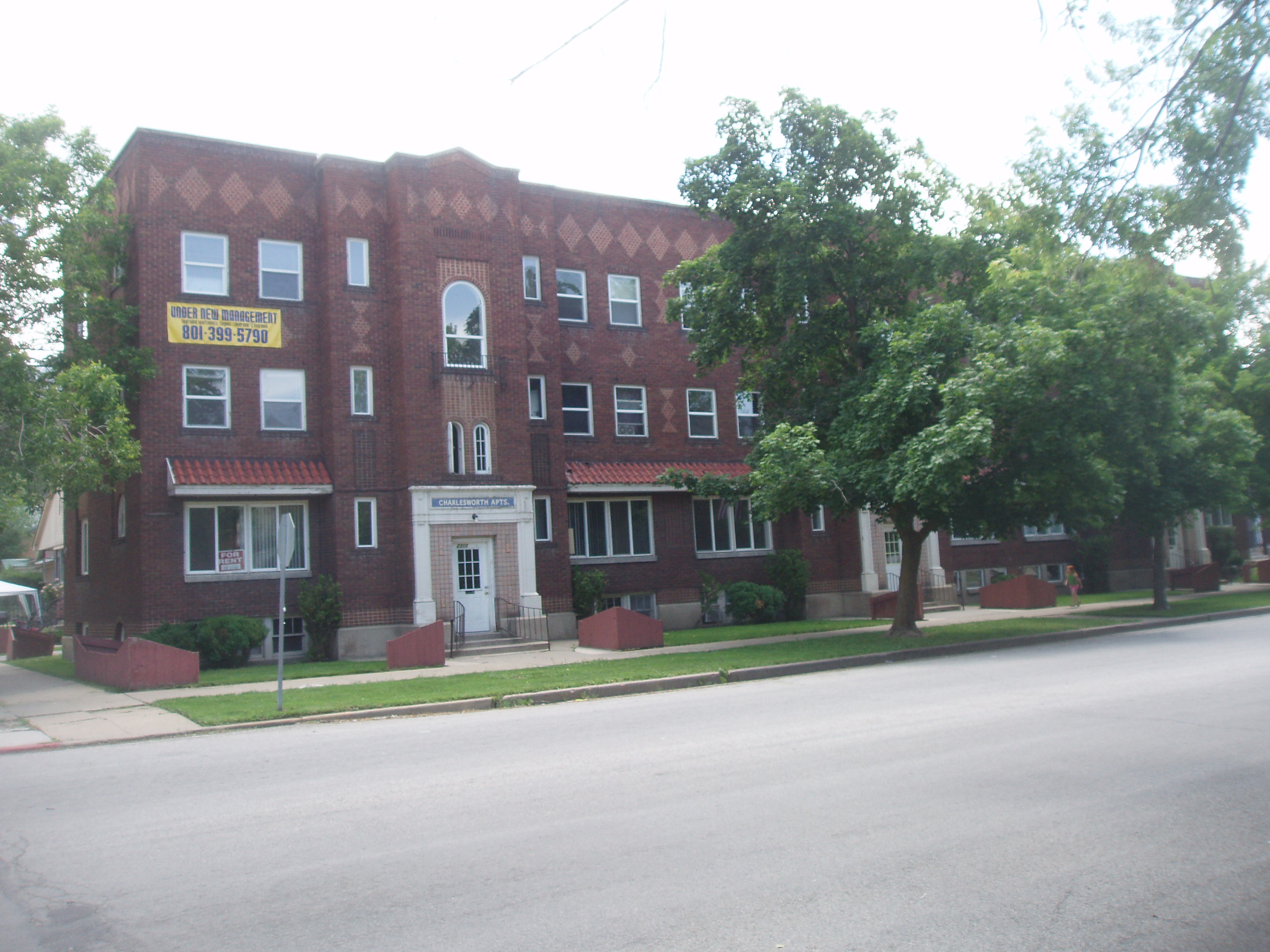
- The building in 2009

- Location within Utah Location within the United States
- Location: 2300--2314 Jefferson Avenue, Ogden, Utah
- Coordinates: 41°13′28″N 111°57′50″W
- Area: less than one acre
- Built: 1925
- Built by: Upton Masonry Co.
- Architectural style: Late 19th And 20th Century Revivals
- MPS: Three-Story Apartment Buildings in Ogden, 1908--1928 MPS
- NRHP reference No.: 87002176
- Added to NRHP: December 31, 1987

Upton Apartments is a historic building in Ogden, Utah. It was built in 1925 by the Upton Masonry Company, with a "somewhat ornate brick exterior." It has been listed on the National Register of Historic Places since December 31, 1987.
