= Hillcrest Apartments =

- U.S. National Register of Historic Places
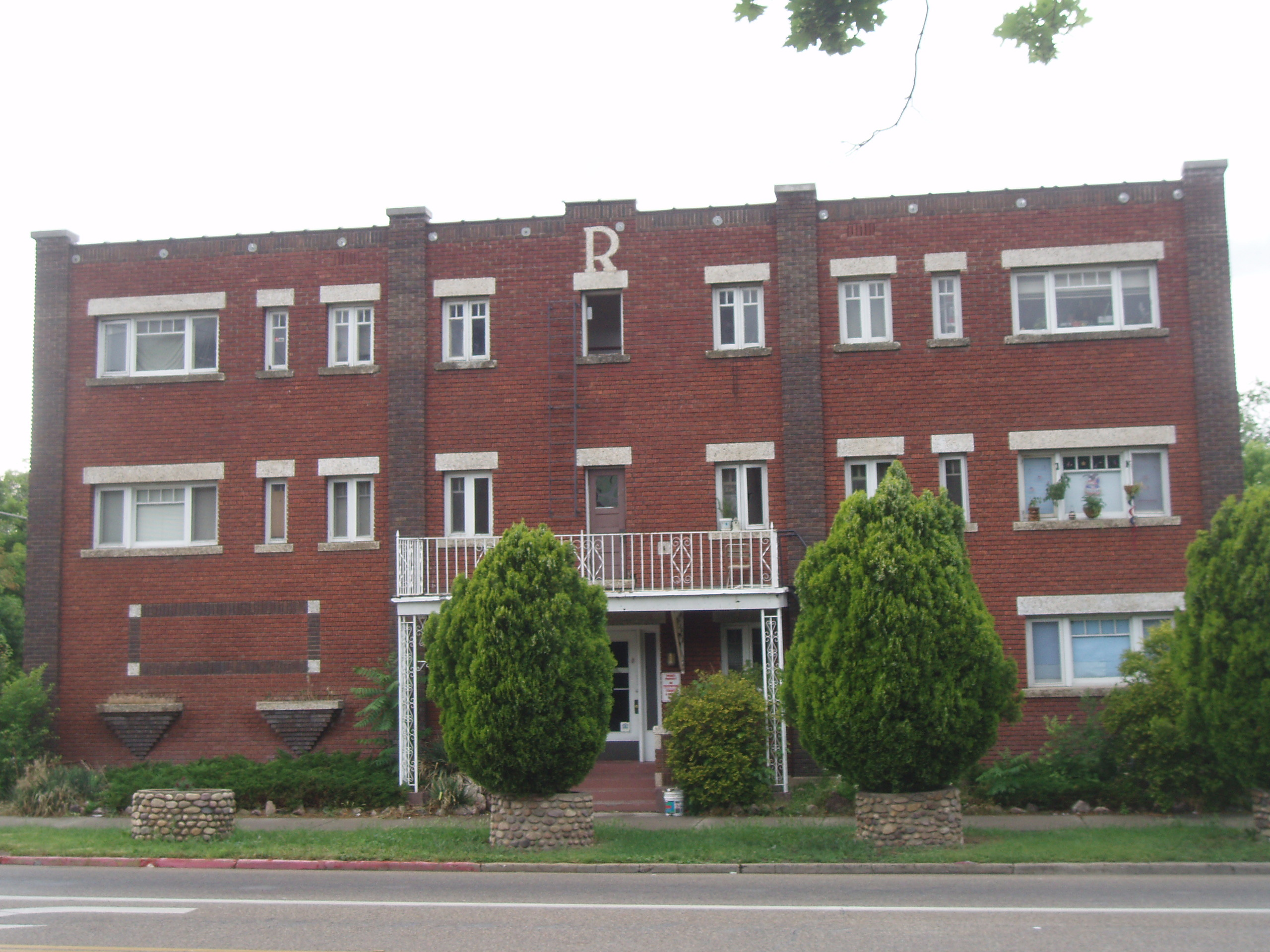
- The building in 2009

- Location within Utah Location within the United States
- Location: 2485 Monroe Avenue, Ogden, Utah
- Coordinates: 41°13′15″N 111°57′33″W
- Area: less than one acre
- Built: 1923
- Architectural style: Late 19th and Early 20th Century American Movements
- MPS: Three-Story Apartment Buildings in Ogden, 1908--1928 MPS
- NRHP reference No.: 87002170
- Added to NRHP: December 31, 1987

Hillcrest Apartments is a historic three-story building in Ogden, Utah. It was built in 1923 for investor Charles Reveliotis, an immigrant from Greece who became a wrestling and boxing impresario in Ogden. Reveliotis, also known as Revell, was a member of the Church of Jesus Christ of Latter-day Saints, and a high priest of its Webster Heights stake; he died in 1960. The building has been listed on the National Register of Historic Places since December 31, 1987.
