= Barnhart Apartments =

- U.S. National Register of Historic Places
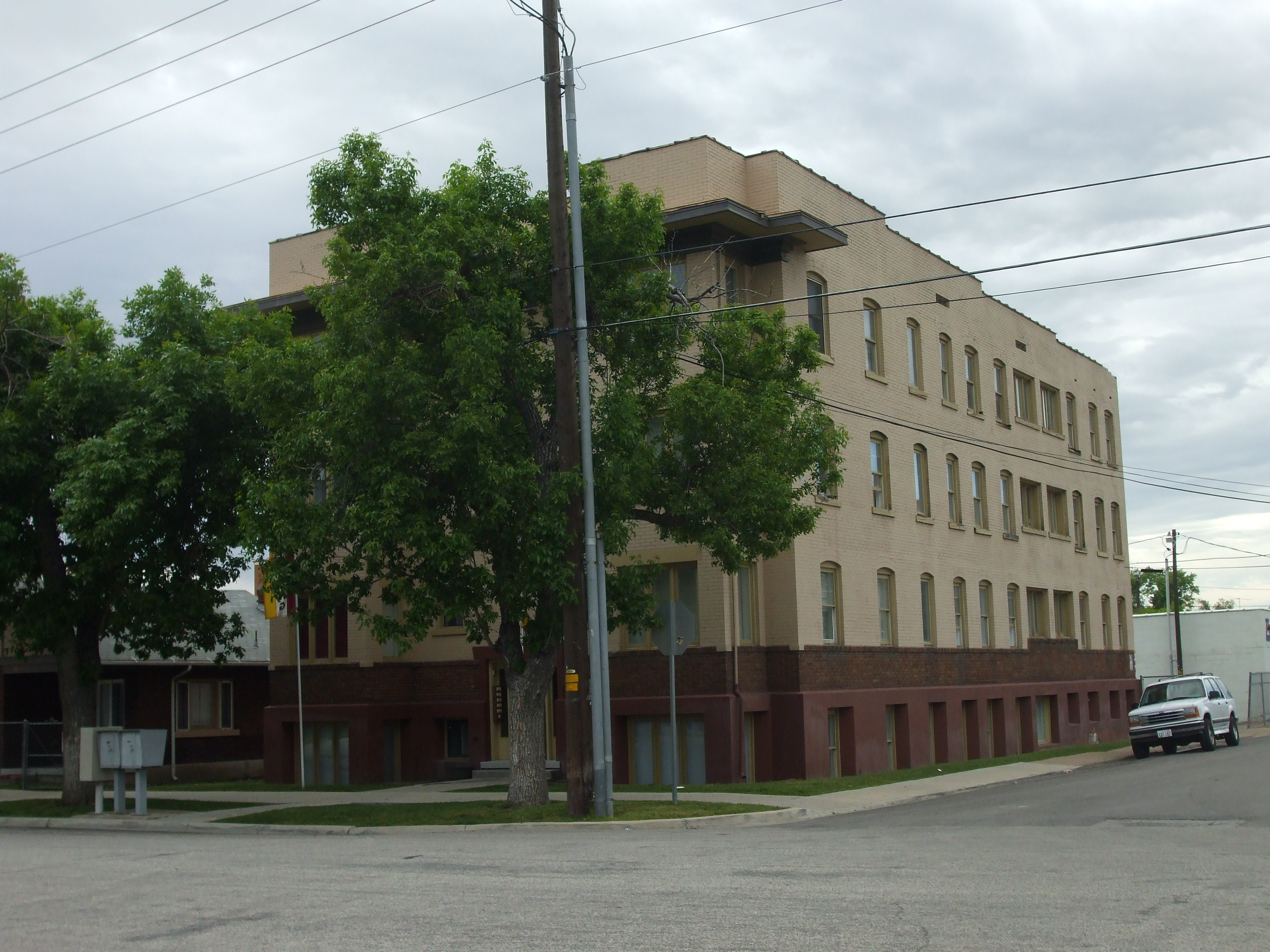
- The building in 2009

- Location within Utah Location within the United States
- Location: 336 Twenty-seventh Street, Ogden, Utah
- Coordinates: 41°13′01″N 111°58′17″W
- Area: less than one acre
- Built: 1921-22
- Built by: Taylor Building Co.
- Architectural style: Prairie School, Double-Loaded Corridor
- MPS: Three-Story Apartment Buildings in Ogden, 1908--1928 MPS
- NRHP reference No.: 87002159
- Added to NRHP: December 31, 1987

Barnhart Apartments is a historic three-story building in Ogden, Utah. It was built in 1921–1922, and designed in the Prairie School style, with "a deep, flat overhanging cornice, triple-ganged casement windows, and a vertical front facade emphasis." It has been listed on the National Register of Historic Places since December 31, 1987.
