= Geffas Apartments =

- U.S. National Register of Historic Places
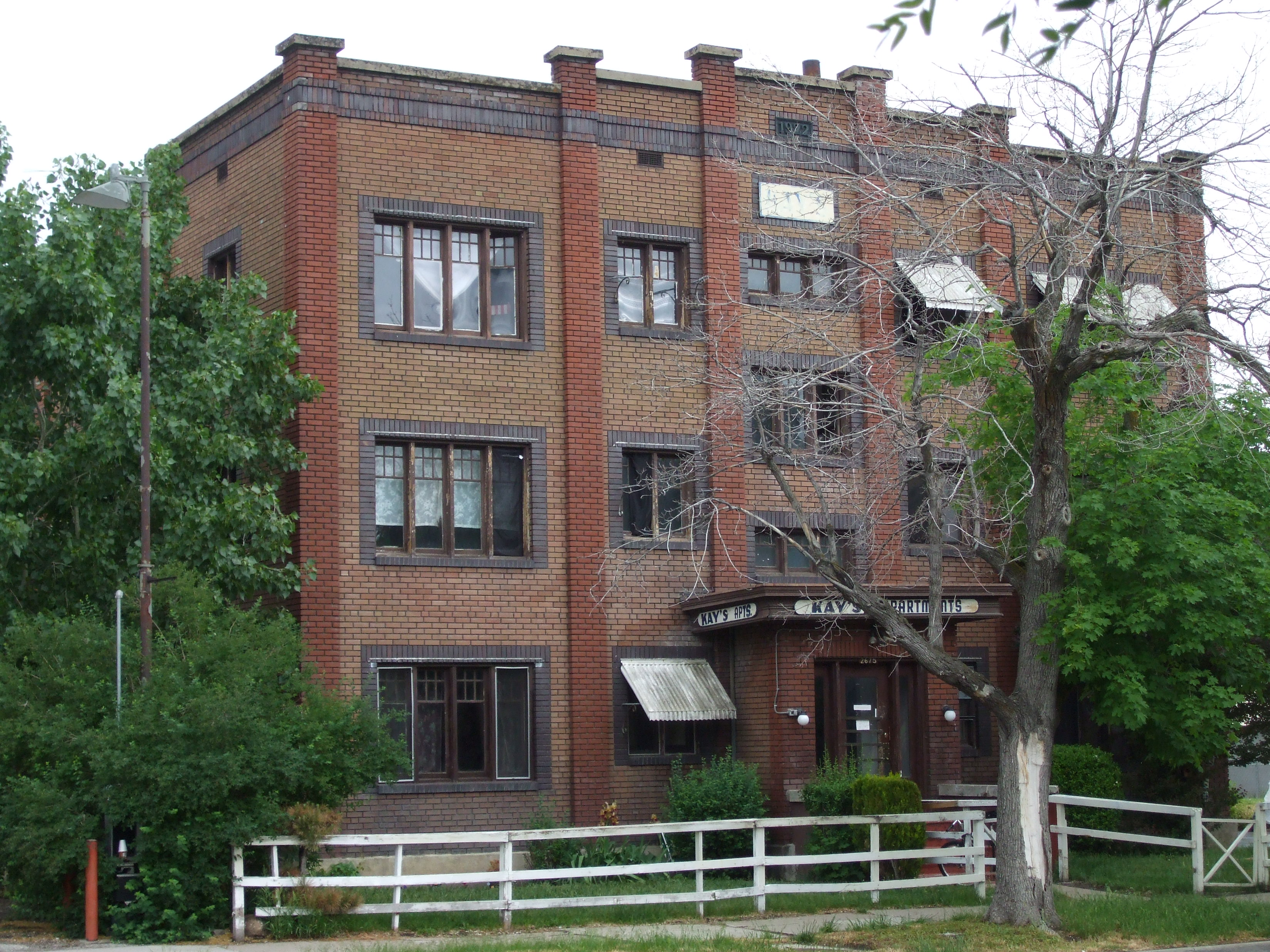
- The building in 2009

- Location within Utah Location within the United States
- Location: 2675 Grant Avenue, Ogden, Utah
- Coordinates: 41°13′01″N 111°58′23″W
- Area: less than one acre
- Built: 1922
- Architectural style: Double-Loaded Corridor
- MPS: Three-Story Apartment Buildings in Ogden, 1908--1928 MPS
- NRHP reference No.: 87002168
- Added to NRHP: December 31, 1987

Geffas Apartments is a historic three-story building in Ogden, Utah. It was built in 1922 for investor Theodore Geffas, an immigrant from Greece. Geffas was also the owner of the City Cafe, the Elite Cafe, and the Streetcar Lunch. He lived in the building with his wife, née Katie Storey and their three daughters; he died in 1955. It has been listed on the National Register of Historic Places since December 31, 1987.
