= John L. and Elizabeth Dalton House =

- U.S. National Register of Historic Places
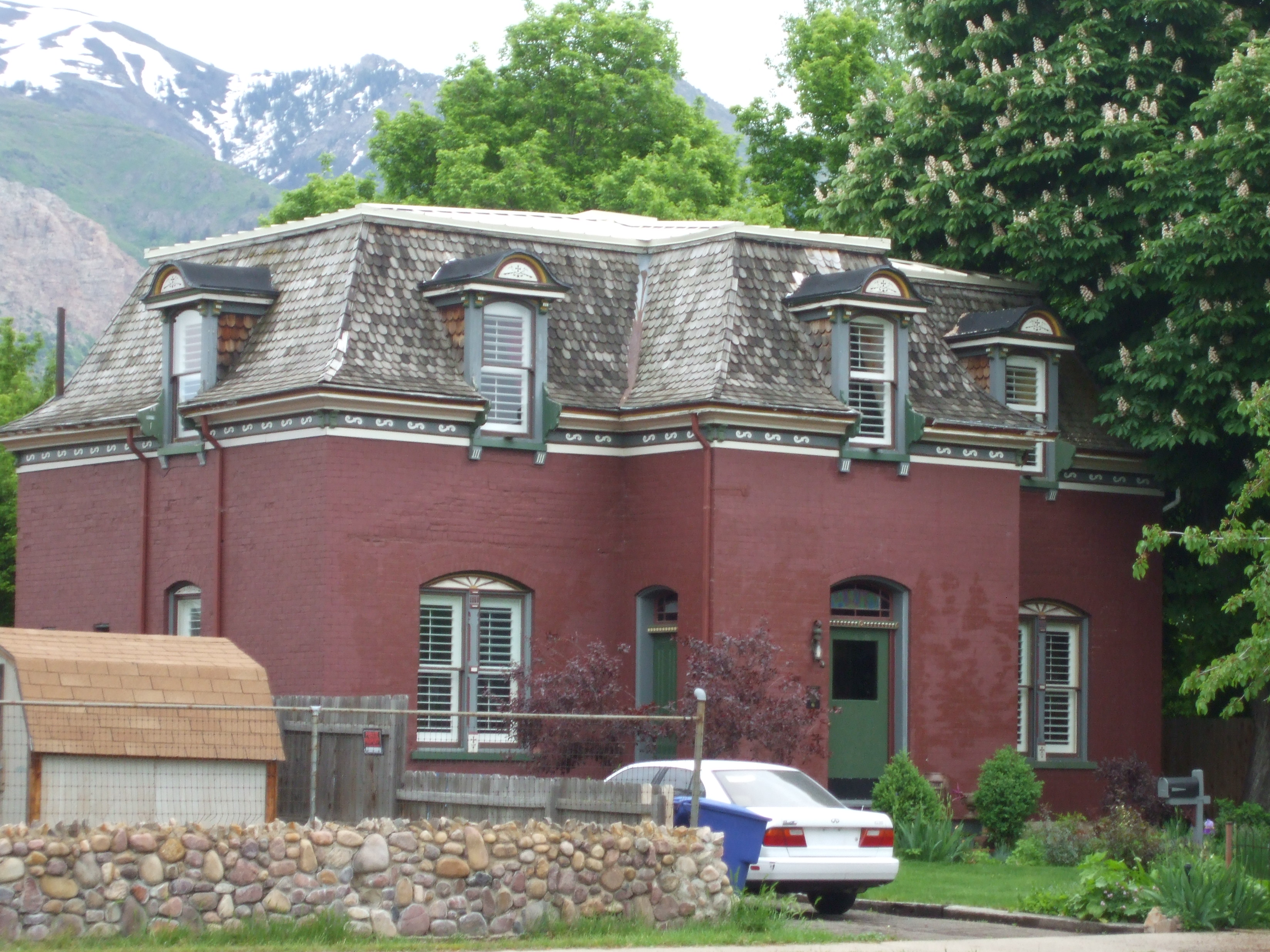
- The house in 2009

- Location within Utah Location within the United States
- Location: 2622 Madison Avenue, Ogden, Utah
- Coordinates: 41°13′05″N 111°57′41″W
- Area: less than one acre
- Built: 1886
- Architectural style: Second Empire
- NRHP reference No.: 86003659
- Added to NRHP: March 11, 1987

The John L. and Elizabeth Dalton House is a historic two-story house in Ogden, Utah. It was built with bricks in 1886, before Utah became a state, and it was designed in the Second Empire style. John L. Dalton had two wives: Elizabeth Mary Studer, with whom he had 11 children, and Amy Edgley, with whom he had two sons. Dalton married his second wife in Mexico and later lived in Pocatello, Idaho with his second wife and their two sons, while his first family remained in Ogden. The house has been listed on the National Register of Historic Places since March 11, 1987.
