= John Moses Browning House =

Historic house in Utah, United States

- U.S. National Register of Historic Places
- U.S. Historic district – Contributing property
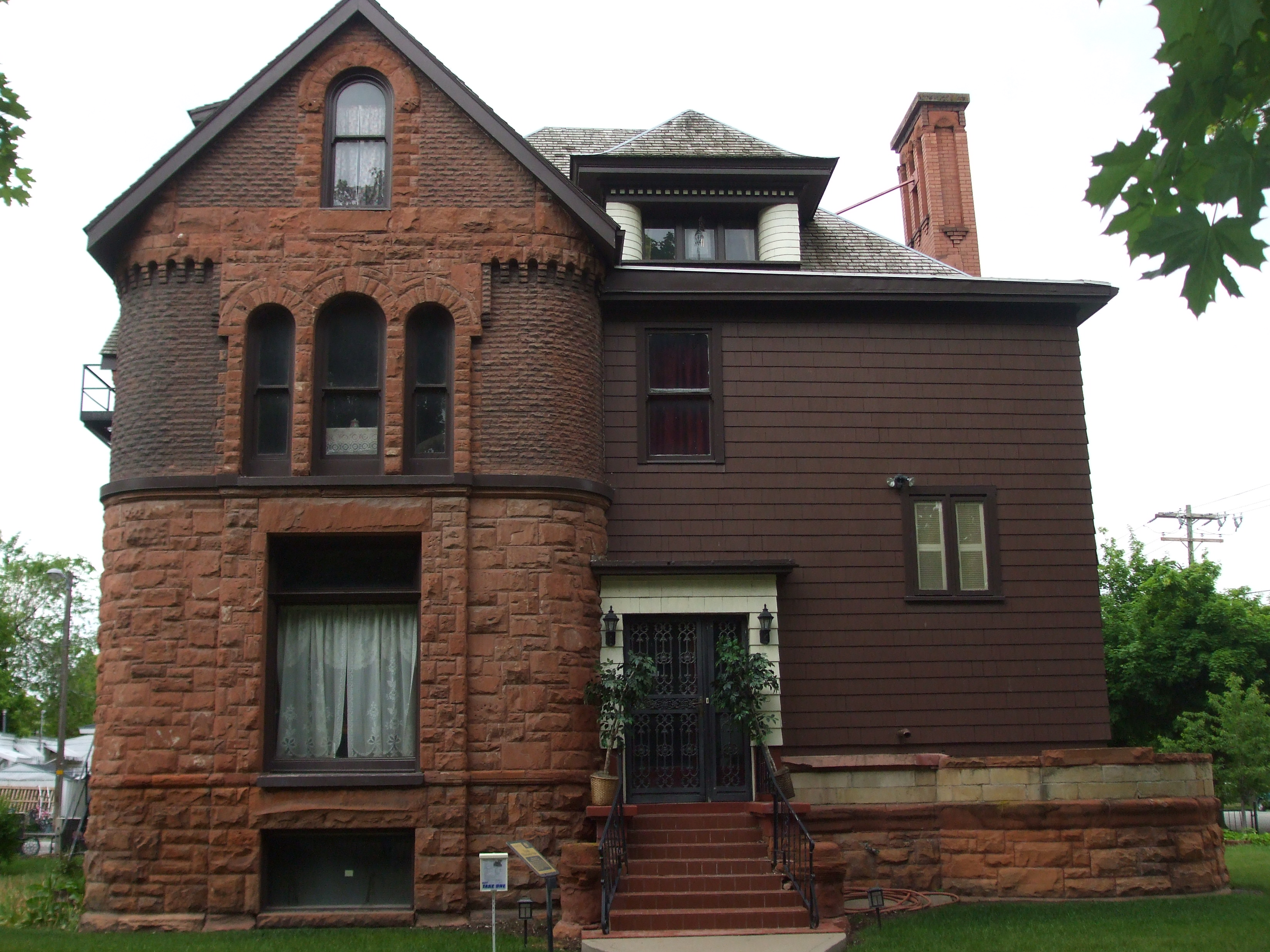
- North view of John Moses Browning, May 2009

- Location within Utah Location within the United States
- Location: 505 27th Street; Ogden, Utah; United States
- Coordinates: 41°12′58″N 111°58′0″W
- Area: less than one acre
- Built: 1900
- Architect: Whittaker, Sam
- Part of: Ogden Central Bench Historic District (ID03000055)
- NRHP reference No.: 73001863

Significant dates
- Added to NRHP: April 24, 1973
- Designated CP: July 22, 2005

The John Moses Browning House is a historic house within the Ogden Central Bench Historic District in Ogden, Utah, United States, that is individually listed on the National Register of Historic Places (NRHP). It was the primary residence of American gun maker John Moses Browning from the turn of the 20th century until his death in 1926.

== Description ==
The house was built between 1890 and 1900 and is located at 505 27th Street. The home is a 6,700-square-foot, 2 1/2-story, eight-bedroom mansion built of sandstone and red brick. The home remained in the Browning family until 1940 when it was sold and converted into apartments. In the mid-1940s the building was purchased by the YWCA and housed a women's shelter before being sold again to a law firm that used it as office space. In 2001 it was renovated again and converted back into a private residence. The property was listed on the National Register of Historic Places on April 24, 1973.

== See also ==
- National Register of Historic Places listings in Weber County, Utah
- John Moses Browning
