= Browning Apartments =

- U.S. National Register of Historic Places
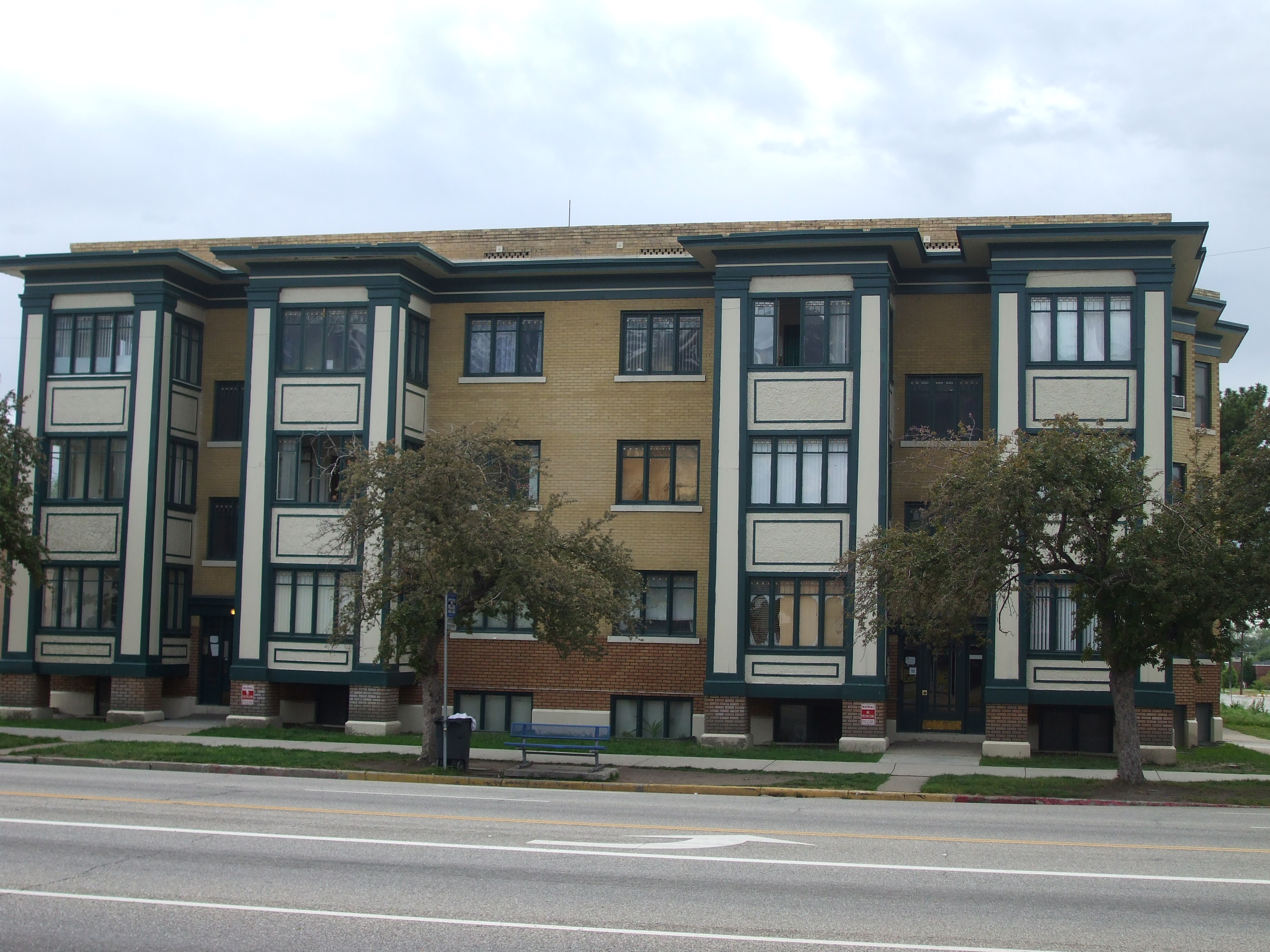
- The building in 2009

- Location within Utah Location within the United States
- Location: 2703 Washington Boulevard, Ogden, Utah
- Coordinates: 41°12′58″N 111°58′13″W
- Area: less than one acre
- Built: 1916
- Built by: John G. Ellis
- Architectural style: Prairie School
- NRHP reference No.: 85003200
- Added to NRHP: December 19, 1985

Browning Apartments is a historic three-story building in Ogden, Utah. It was built in 1916 for investor George Emmett Browning, who served as the mayor of Ogden from 1925 to 1927. A member of the Church of Jesus Christ of Latter-day Saints, he was also the president of its Weber stake for sixteen years. The building was designed in the Prairie School style, and Browning resided in apartment 3 from 1930 to 1948. It has been listed on the National Register of Historic Places since December 19, 1985.
