= Charles W. Cross House =

- U.S. National Register of Historic Places
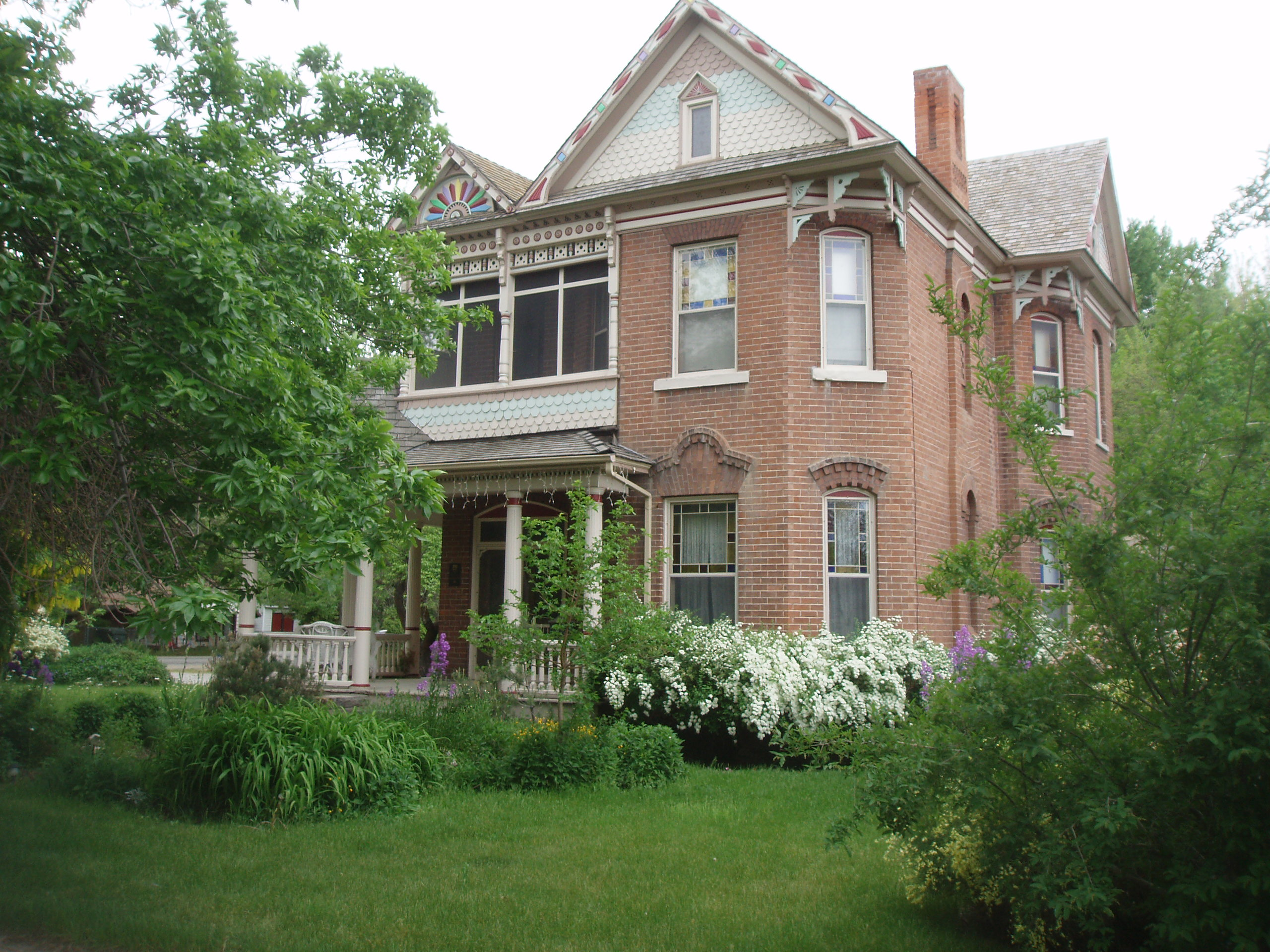
- The house in 2009

- Location within Utah Location within the United States
- Location: 451 17th Street, Ogden, Utah
- Coordinates: 41°14′10″N 111°58′46″W
- Area: less than one acre
- Built: 1891
- Architectural style: Queen Anne
- NRHP reference No.: 84002434
- Added to NRHP: July 12, 1984

The Charles W. Cross House is a historic two-story house in Ogden, Utah. It was built in 1890–1891, before Utah became a state, for Charles W. Cross, an immigrant from England who became a harness maker and council member in Ogden. The house was designed in the Queen Anne architectural style. It has been listed on the National Register of Historic Places since July 12, 1984.
