= Andrew J. Warner House =

- U.S. National Register of Historic Places
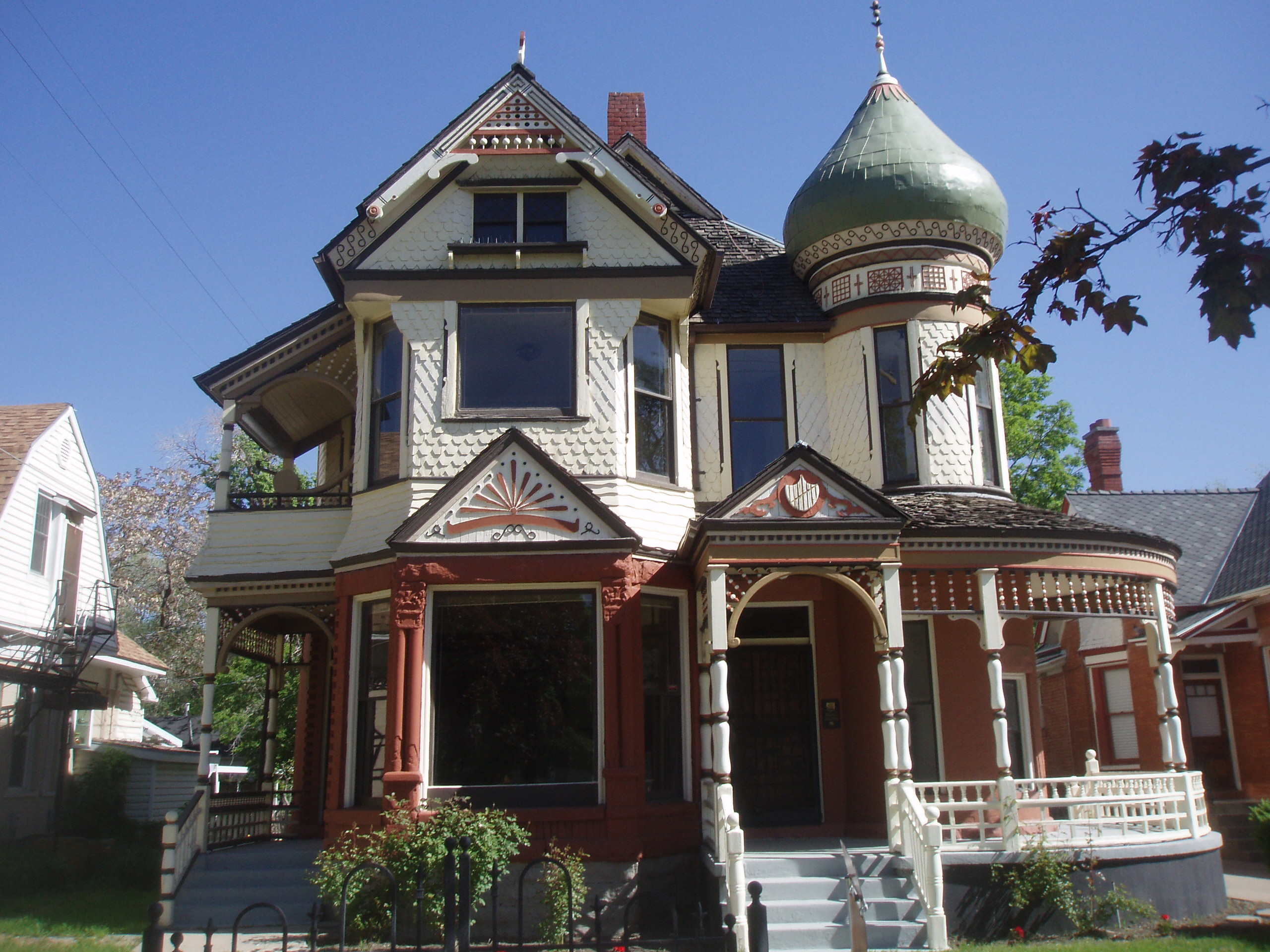
- The house in 2009

- Location within Utah Location within the United States
- Location: 726 25th Street, Ogden, Utah
- Coordinates: 41°13′16″N 111°57′37″W
- Area: less than one acre
- Built: 1890
- Architectural style: Queen Anne
- NRHP reference No.: 77001328
- Added to NRHP: December 13, 1977

The Andrew J. Warner House is a historic house in Ogden, Utah. It was built in 1890 for Andrew J. Warner, a realtor who later moved to Los Angeles, California before Utah became a state, and it was designed in the Queen Anne architectural style. It has been listed on the National Register of Historic Places since December 13, 1977.
