= Farnsworth Apartments =

- U.S. National Register of Historic Places
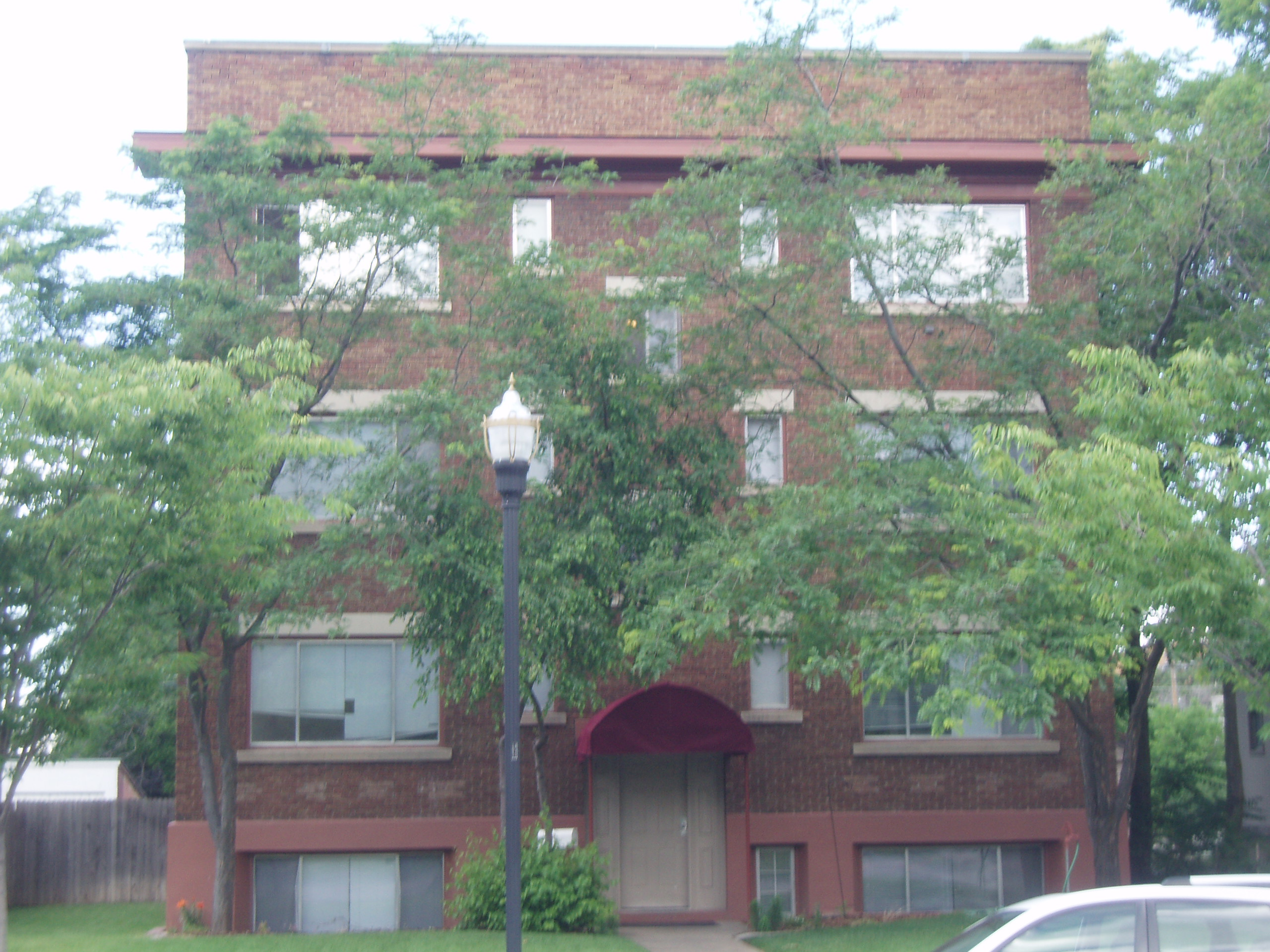
- The building in 2009

- Location within Utah Location within the United States
- Location: 2539 Jefferson Avenue, Ogden, Utah
- Coordinates: 41°13′11″N 111°57′54″W
- Area: less than one acre
- Built: 1922
- Built by: Taylor Building Co.
- Architectural style: Late 19th And Early 20th Century American Movements
- MPS: Three-Story Apartment Buildings in Ogden, 1908--1928 MPS
- NRHP reference No.: 87002162
- Added to NRHP: December 31, 1987

The Farnsworth Apartments is a historic three-story building in Ogden, Utah. It was built by the Taylor Building Company in 1922, and acquired by investors J. W. and Flora F. Farnsworth in 1923. It has been listed on the National Register of Historic places since December 31, 1987.
