= Arvondor Apartments =

- U.S. National Register of Historic Places
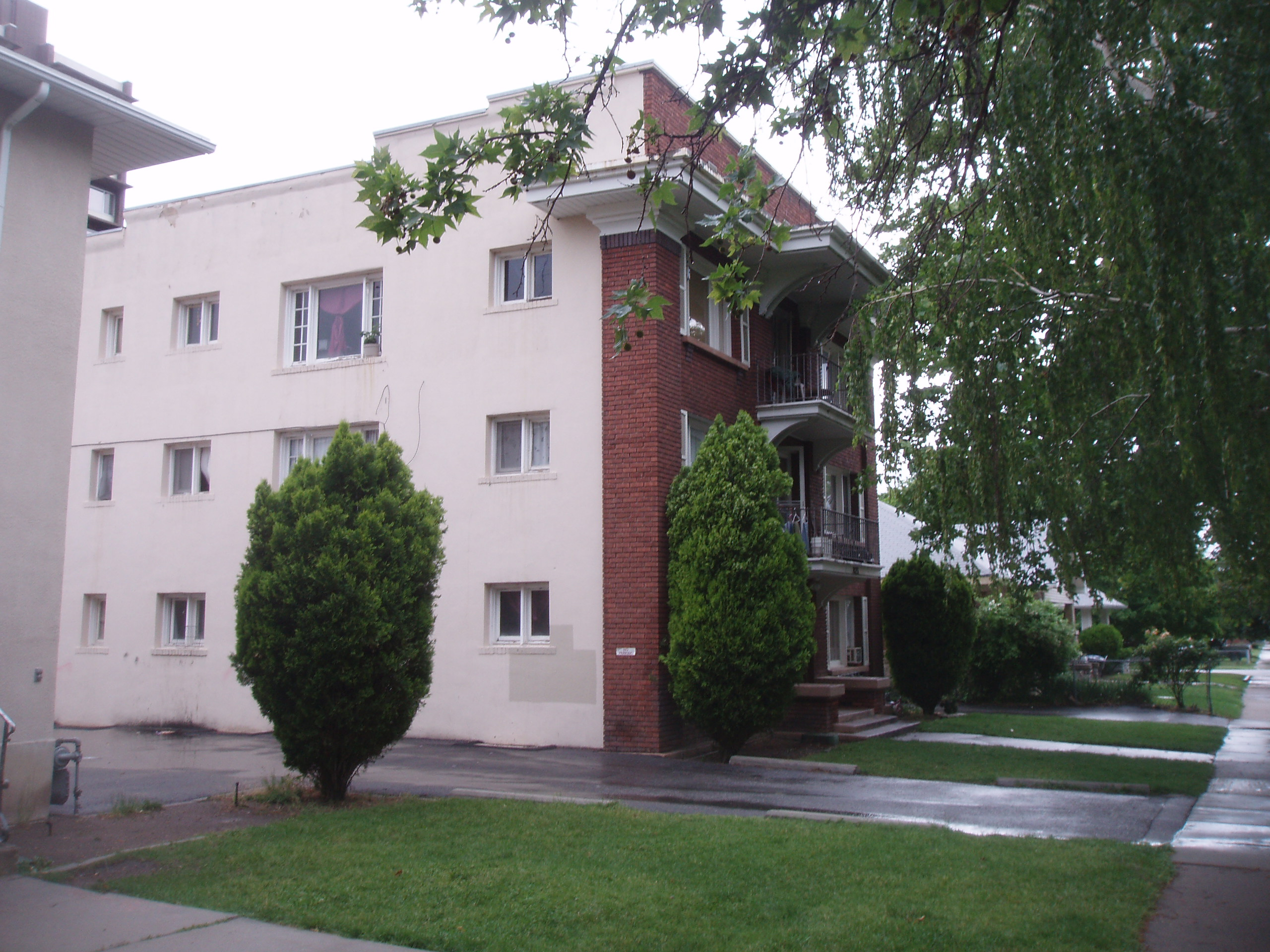
- The building in 2009

- Location within Utah Location within the United States
- Location: 823 Twenty-third Street, Ogden, Utah
- Coordinates: 41°13′28″N 111°57′27″W
- Area: less than one acre
- Built: 1925
- Architectural style: Prairie School
- MPS: Three-Story Apartment Buildings in Ogden, 1908--1928 MPS
- NRHP reference No.: 87002156
- Added to NRHP: December 31, 1987

Arvondor Apartments is a historic three-story apartment building in Ogden, Utah. It was built in 1925 for investor William T. Pickett, and designed in the Prairie School architectural style. It has been listed on the National Register of Historic Places since December 31, 1987.
