= La Frantz Apartments =

- U.S. National Register of Historic Places
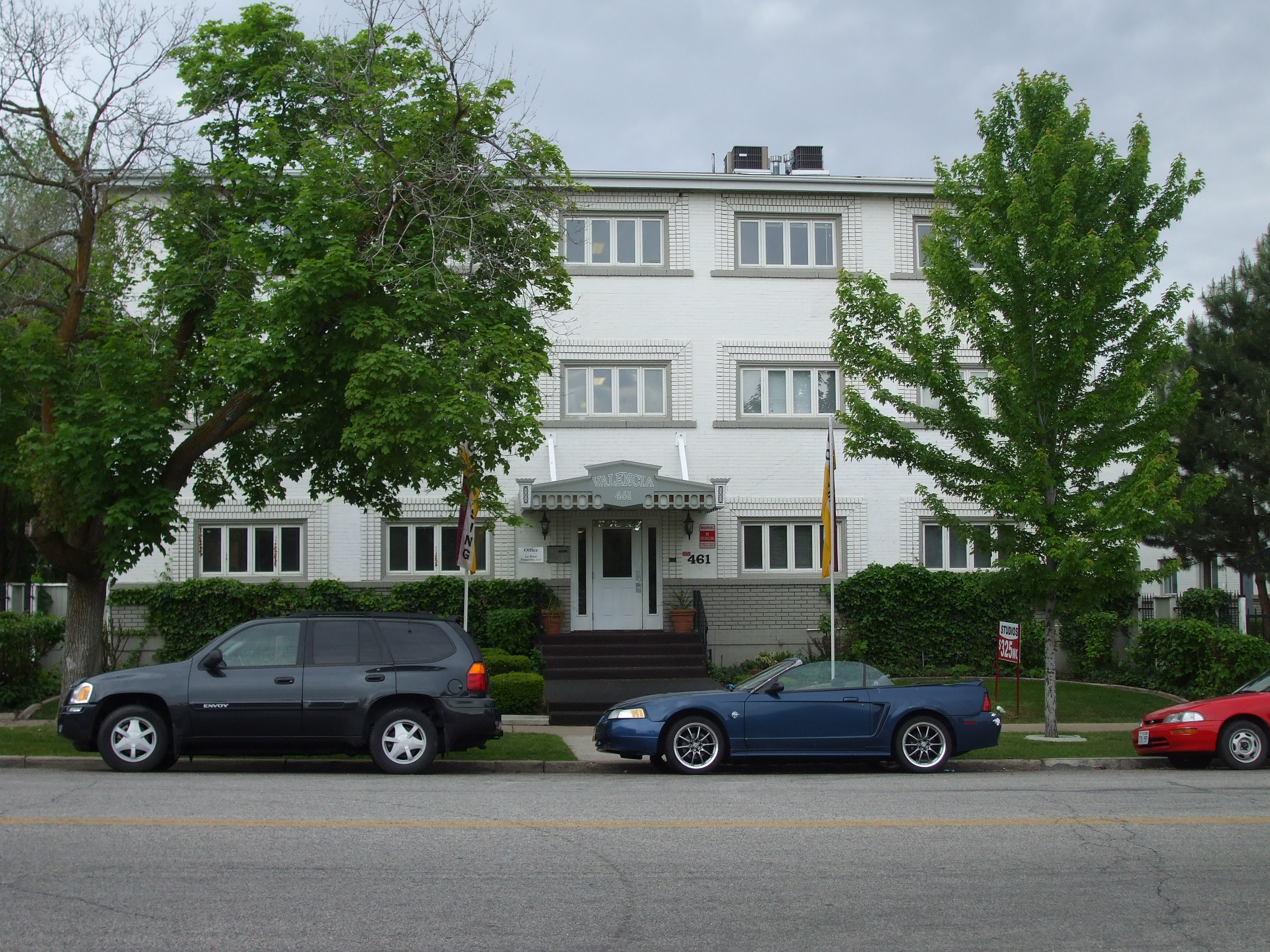
- The building in 2009

- Location within Utah Location within the United States
- Location: 461 Twenty-seventh Street, Ogden, Utah
- Coordinates: 41°12′58″N 111°58′07″W
- Area: less than one acre
- Built: 1919
- Architectural style: Double-Loaded Corridor
- MPS: Three-Story Apartment Buildings in Ogden, 1908--1928 MPS
- NRHP reference No.: 87002172
- Added to NRHP: December 31, 1987

La Frantz Apartments is a historic three-story building in Ogden, Utah. It was built in 1919-1920 for investor William J. Stephens, and named for one of his sons, William La Frantz Stephens. It has been listed on the National Register of Historic Places since December 31, 1987.
