= Valasco Farr House =

- U.S. National Register of Historic Places
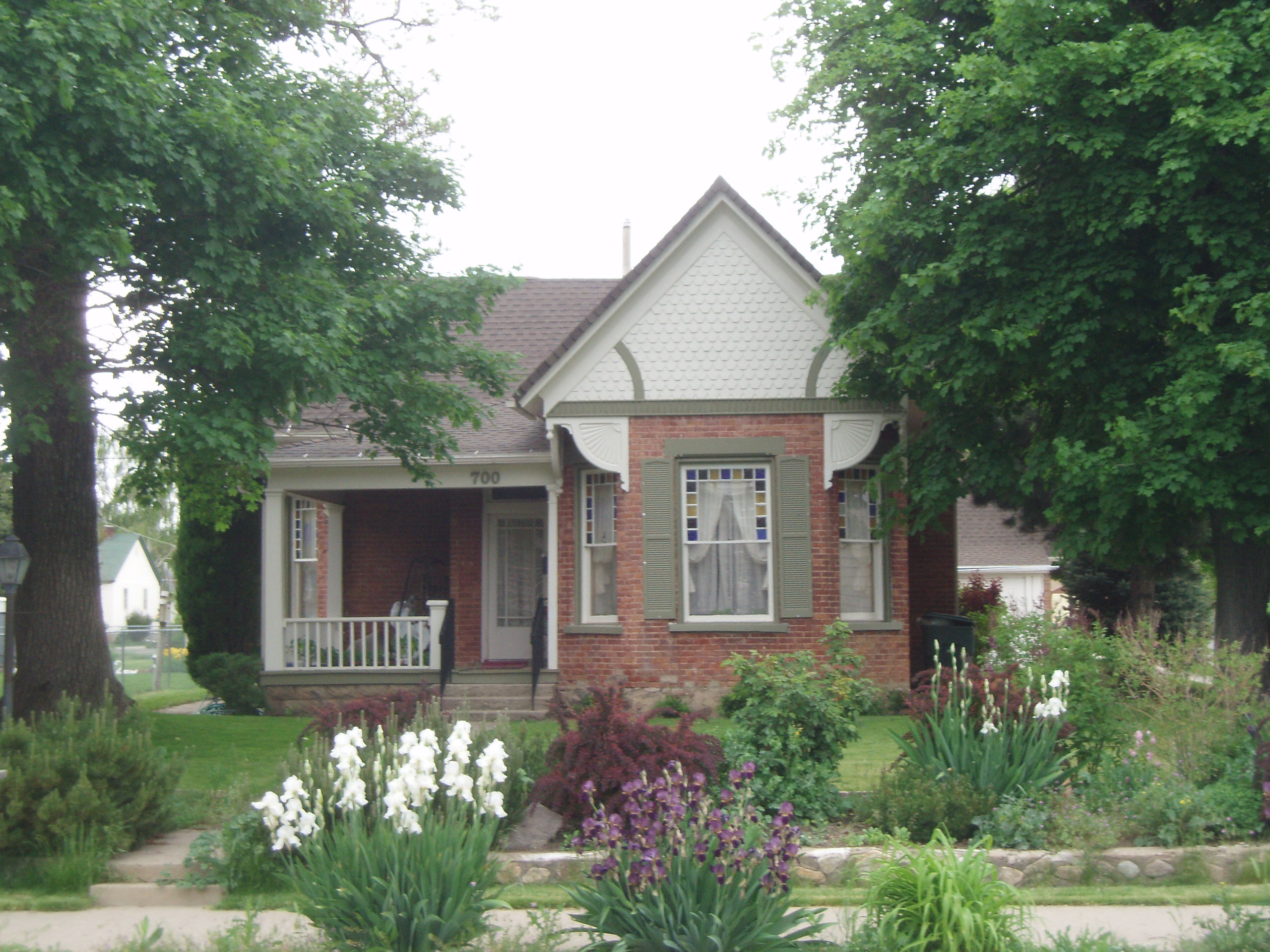

- Location within Utah
- Location: 700 Canyon Rd., Ogden, Utah
- Coordinates: 41°14′17″N 111°57′40″W
- Area: less than one acre
- Built: 1887
- Architect: William Wilson Fife
- Architectural style: Queen Anne
- NRHP reference No.: 78002712
- Added to NRHP: June 13, 1978

The Valasco Farr House, also known as the William Fife House, at 700 Canyon Rd. in Ogden, Utah, was built in 1887. It was listed on the National Register of Historic Places in 1978.

It is a one-story cottage which was designed by architect William Wilson Fife in Queen Anne style.

Fife was a brother-in-law of the original owner, Valasco Farr, who was son of Lorin Farr, the first mayor of Ogden. The house was built on a portion of property deeded to Lorin Farr by Ulysses S. Grant (why?).

The house was the farmhouse of what was once a 3 acres (1.2 ha) farm.
