= John F. and Lillia Dumke House =

- John F. Dumke and Lillia
- U.S. National Register of Historic Places
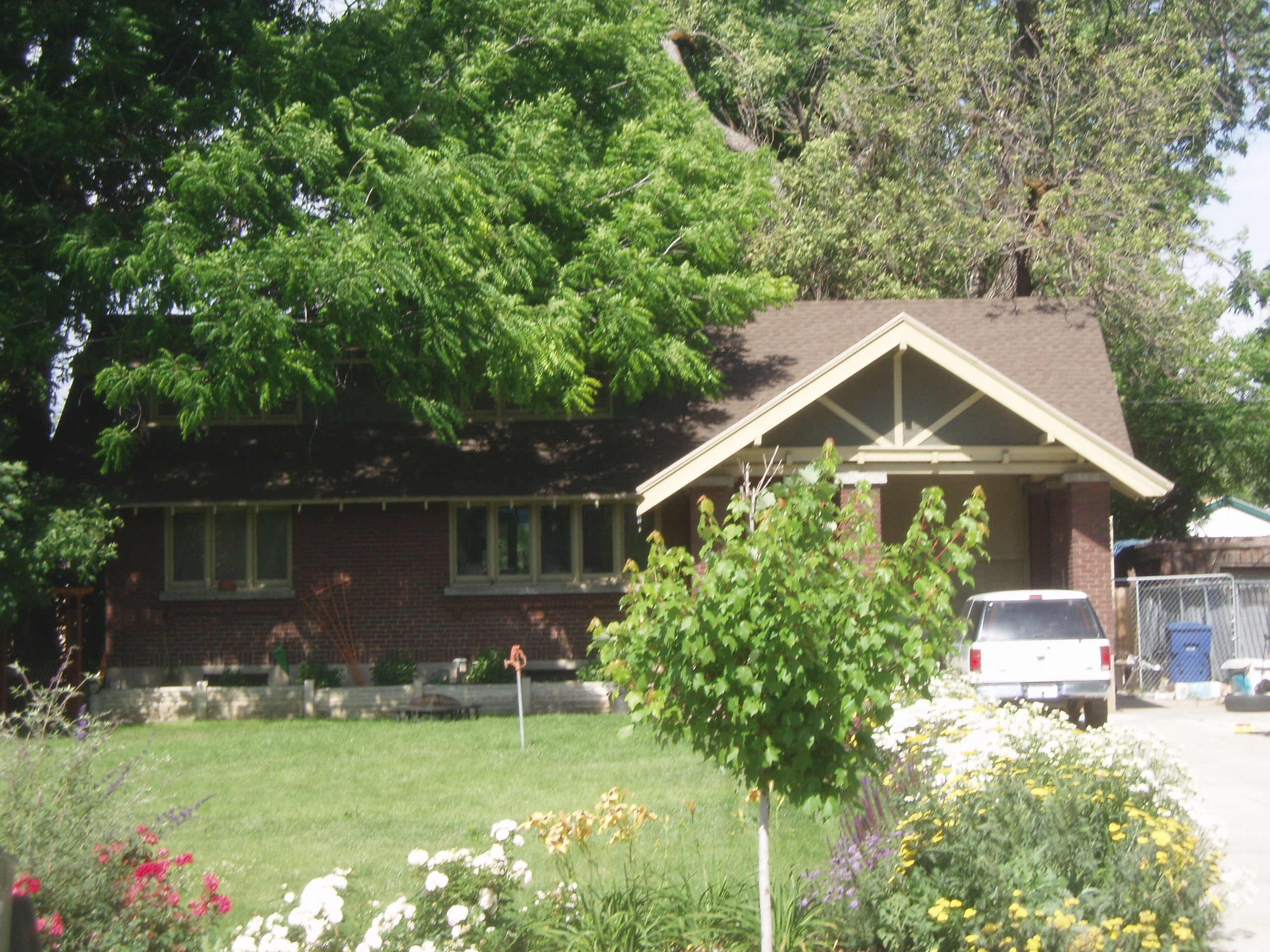

- Location within Utah Location within the United States
- Location: 1607 Kiesel Ave., Ogden, Utah
- Coordinates: 41°14′19″N 111°58′17″W
- Area: 0.3 acres (0.12 ha)
- Built: 1920
- Architectural style: Bungalow/craftsman
- NRHP reference No.: 07000078
- Added to NRHP: February 14, 2007

The John F. Dumke and Lillia or John F. and Lillia Dumke House, at 1607 Kiesel Ave. in Ogden, Utah, was built in 1920. It was listed on the National Register of Historic Places in 2007.

It is a Craftsman-style bungalow.
