= Augustus B. Patton House =

- U.S. National Register of Historic Places
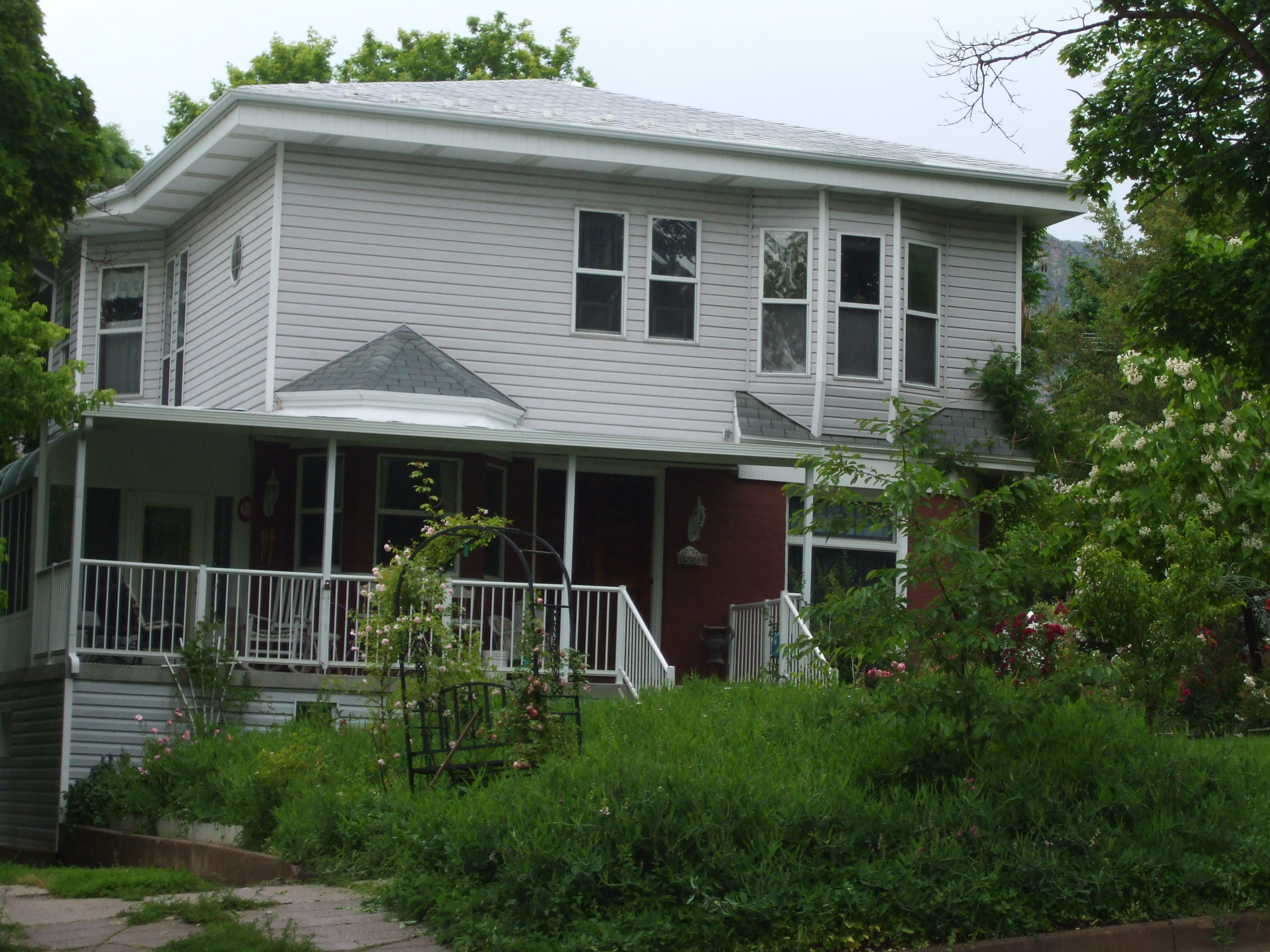
- The house in 2009

- Location within Utah Location within the United States
- Location: 1506 24th Street, Ogden, Utah
- Coordinates: 41°13′21″N 111°56′21″W
- Area: less than one acre
- Built: 1891; 135 years ago
- Architectural style: Shingle Style
- NRHP reference No.: 82004189
- Added to NRHP: February 19, 1982; 44 years ago

The Augustus B. Patton House is a historic house in Ogden, Utah. It was built in 1891, before Utah became a state, for Augustus B. Patton, a lawyer and real estate developer who lived here until his death in 1911. The house was purchased by a series of homeowners until it was acquired in 1934 by S. Dilworth Young, a general authority in the Church of Jesus Christ of Latter-day Saints who served on the First Council of the Seventy and the First Quorum of Seventy; he remained the homeowner until 1955. The house was designed in the Shingle style architectural style. It has been listed on the National Register of Historic Places since February 19, 1982.
