= Helms Apartments =

- U.S. National Register of Historic Places
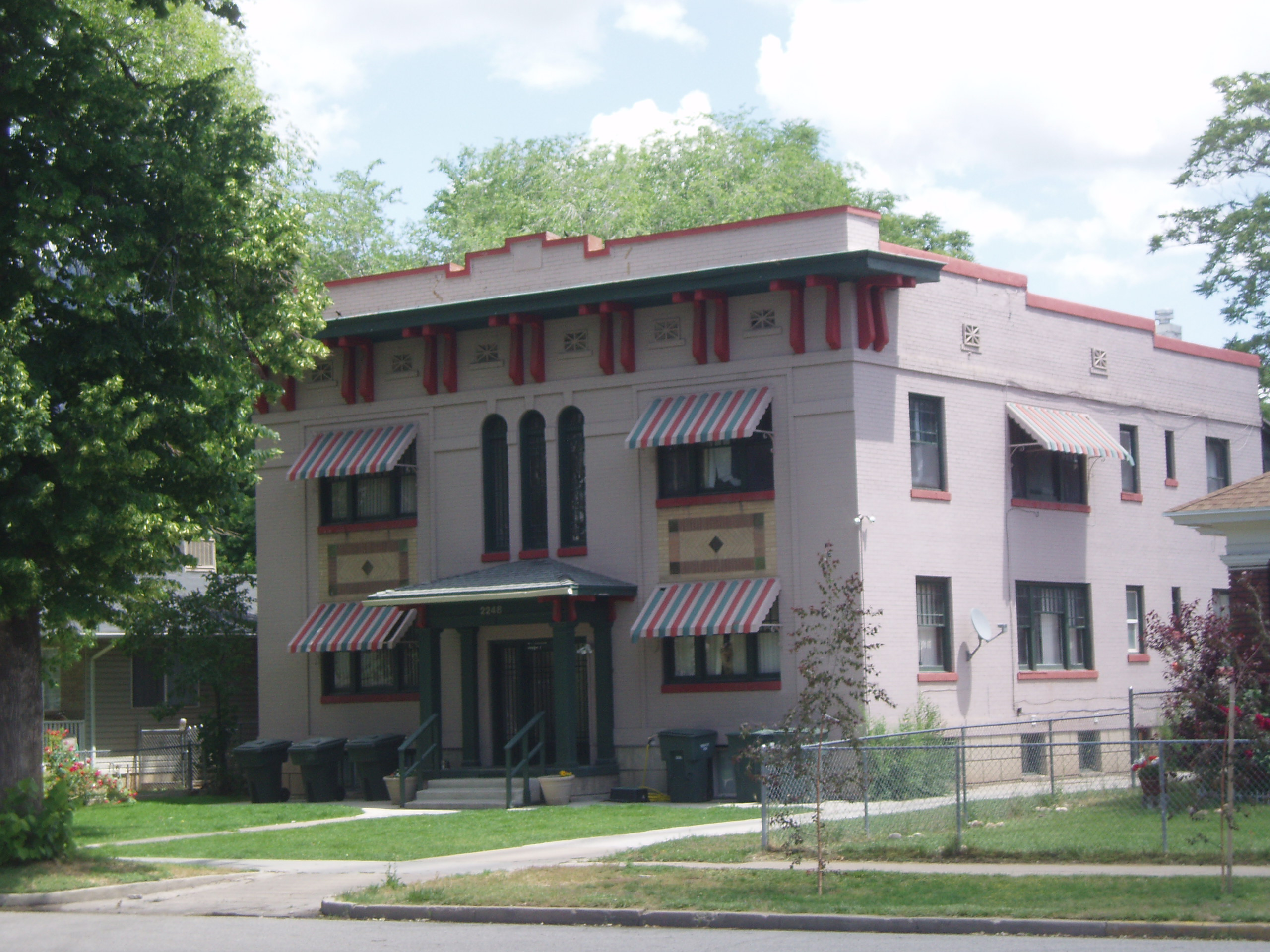

- Location within Utah
- Location: 2248--2250 Jefferson Ave., Ogden, Utah
- Coordinates: 41°13′33″N 111°57′50″W
- Area: less than one acre
- Built: 1916-19
- Built by: Charles J. Humphris
- Architectural style: Late 19th and 20th Century Revivals, Prairie School
- MPS: Three-Story Apartment Buildings in Ogden, 1908--1928 MPS
- NRHP reference No.: 87002169
- Added to NRHP: December 31, 1987

The Helms Apartments, at 2248-2250 Jefferson Ave. in Ogden, Utah, was built during 1916 to 1919. It was listed on the United States National Register of Historic Places in 1987.

It is a two-and-a-half-story brick apartment building, upon a concrete foundation, with two apartments on each of three levels. It was deemed "one of the smallest, yet most visually interesting of 21 pre-Depression apartment buildings identified in Ogden."

The listing includes two garages behind the apartment building as contributing buildings.

It was built by Ogden contractor Charles J. Humphris.
