= Flowers Apartments =

- U.S. National Register of Historic Places
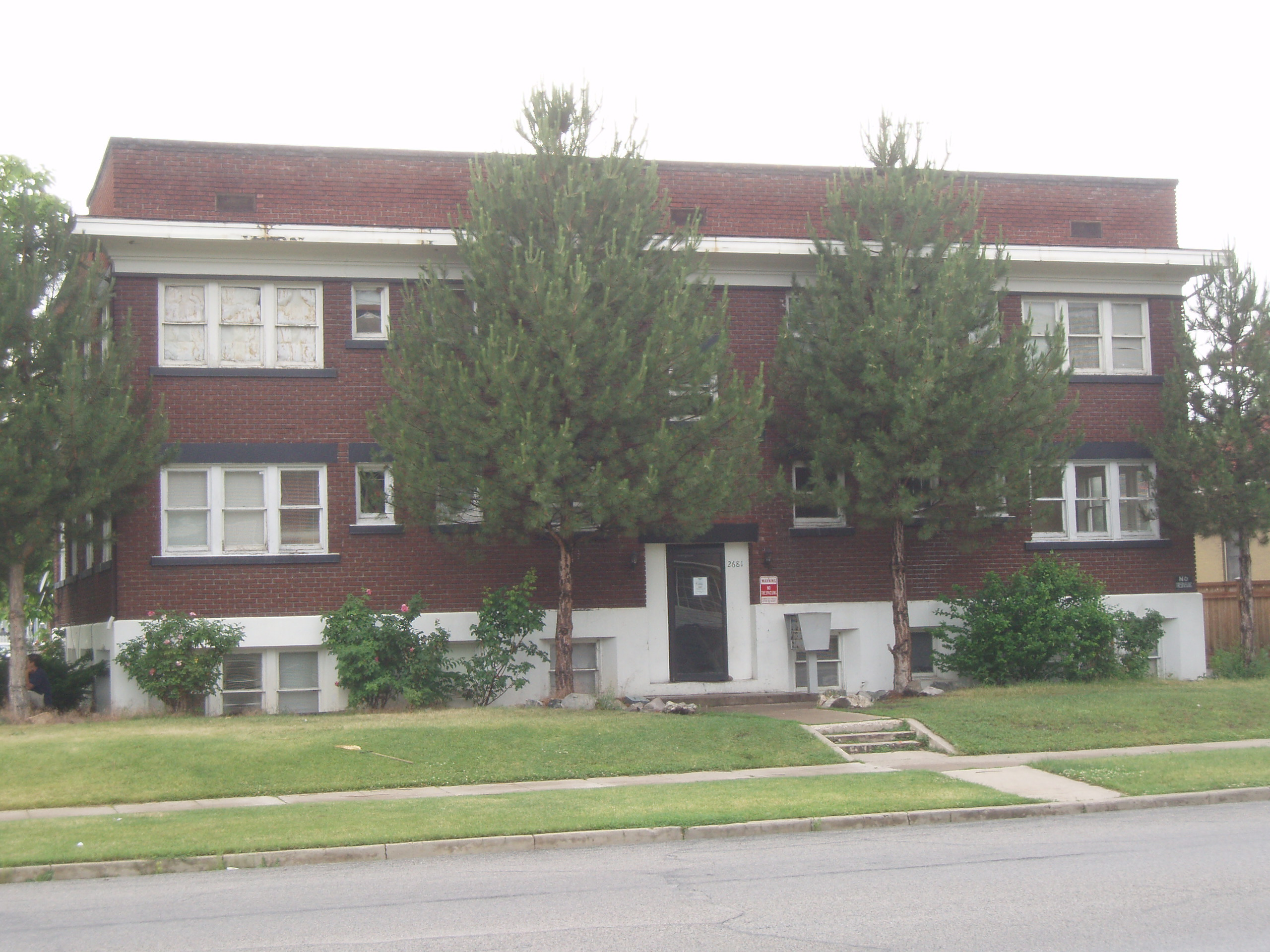
- The building in 2009

- Location within Utah Location within the United States
- Location: 2681 Madison Avenue, Ogden, Utah
- Coordinates: 41°13′01″N 111°57′43″W
- Area: less than one acre
- Built: 1923
- Built by: Taylor Building Co.
- Architectural style: Double-Loaded Corridor
- MPS: Three-Story Apartment Buildings in Ogden, 1908--1928 MPS
- NRHP reference No.: 87002166
- Added to NRHP: December 31, 1987

Flowers Apartments is a historic three-story building in Ogden, Utah. It was built in 1923 by the Taylor Building Company as an investment for George M. and Etha Flowers. It was listed on the National Register of Historic Places in 1987.
