= Eccles Building (Ogden, Utah) =

- U.S. National Register of Historic Places
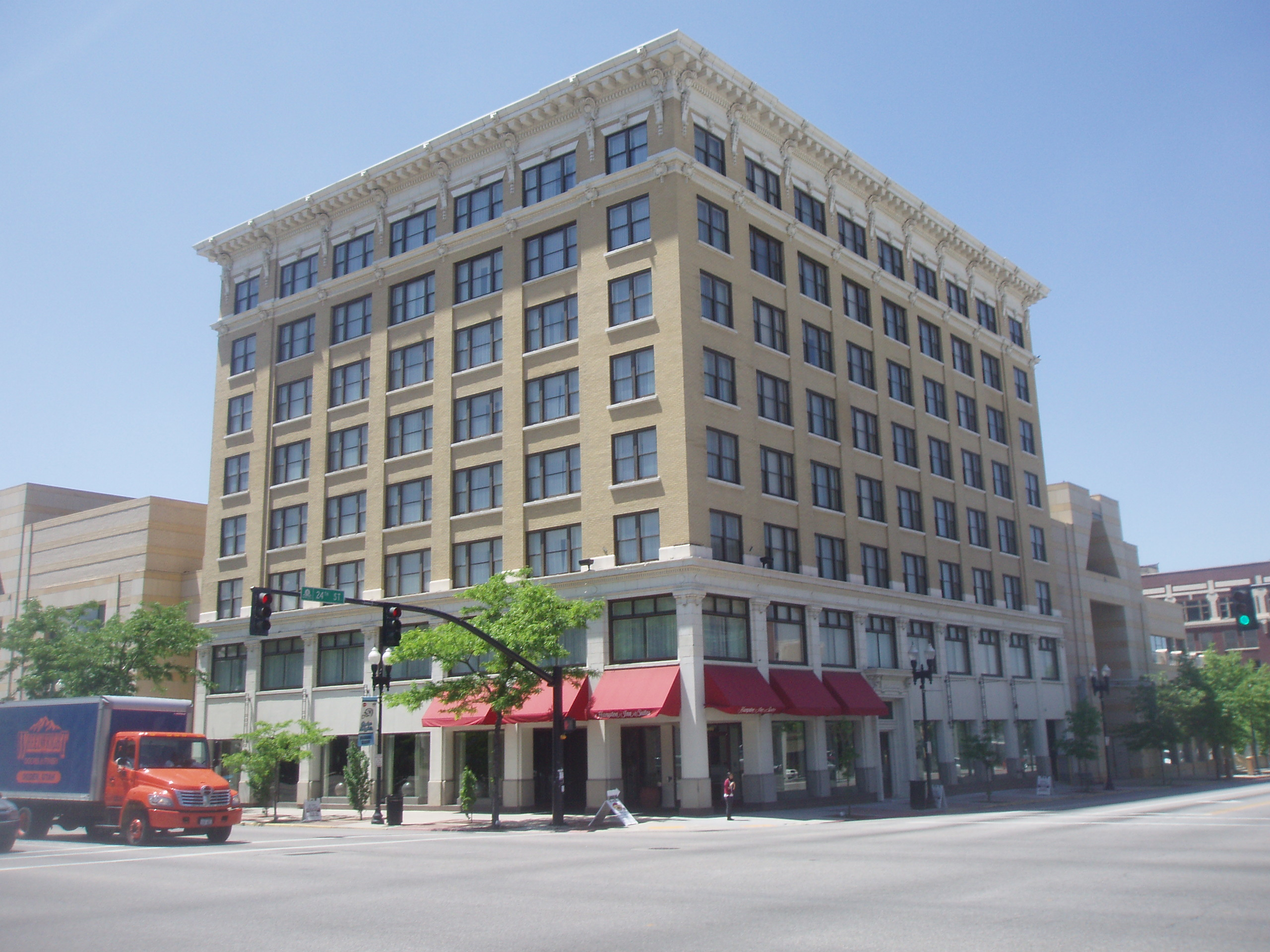

- Location within Utah Location within the United States
- Location: 385 24th St., Ogden, Utah
- Coordinates: 41°13′22″N 111°58′10″W
- Area: less than one acre
- Built: 1913
- Architect: Leslie S. Hodgson
- Architectural style: Chicago, Commercial Style
- NRHP reference No.: 82004187
- Added to NRHP: July 14, 1982

The Eccles Building, at 385 24th St. in Ogden, Utah, was built in 1913. It was listed on the National Register of Historic Places in 1982.

It was designed in Chicago school style by architect Leslie S. Hodgson.

It is an eight-story steel-framed building, designed in Commercial Style.
