= Fairview Apartments (Ogden, Utah) =

- U.S. National Register of Historic Places
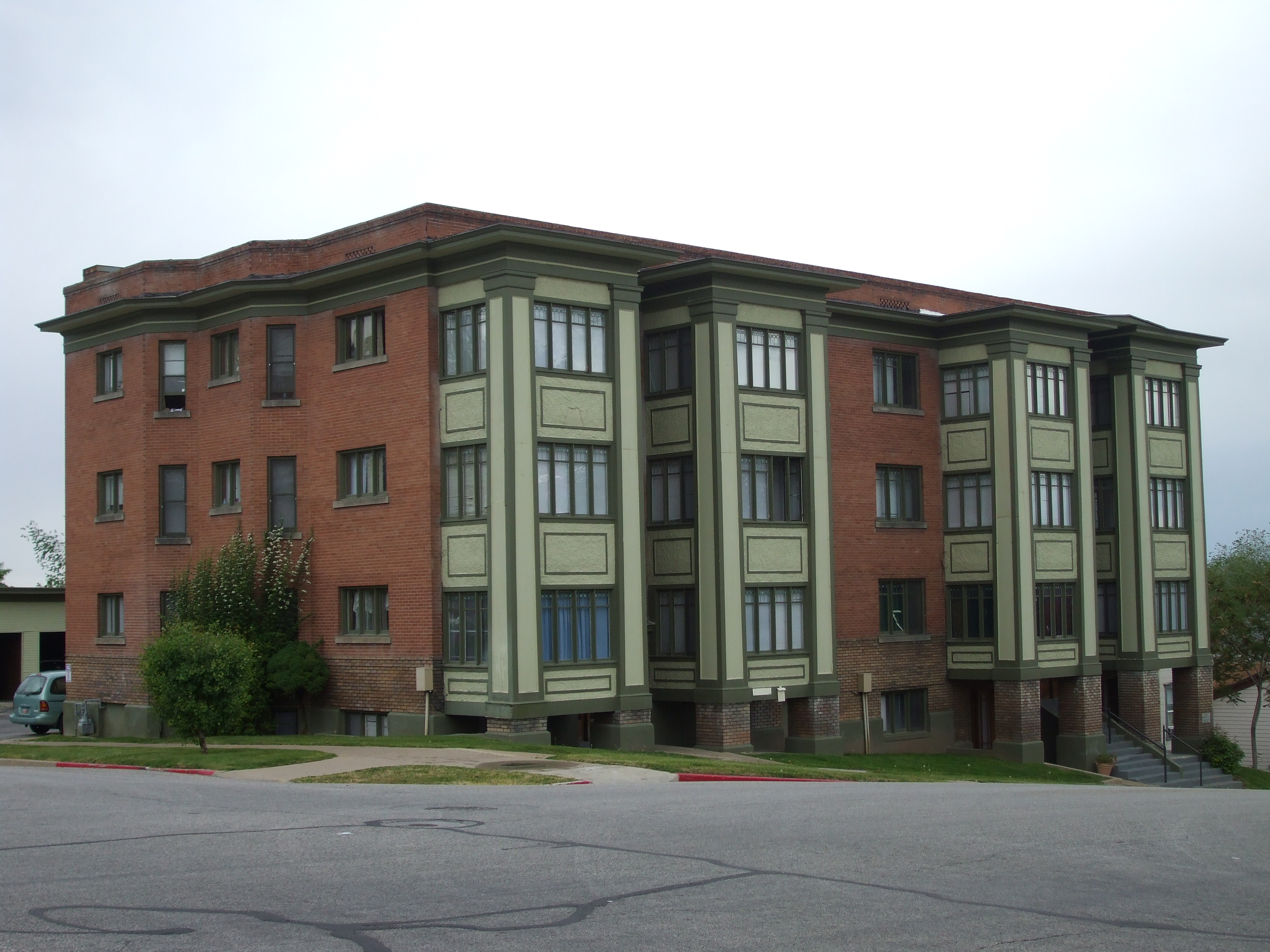

- Location within Utah Location within the United States
- Location: 579-587 27h St., Ogden, Utah
- Coordinates: 41°12′58″N 111°58′36″W
- Area: less than one acre
- Built: 1916
- Architect: Ellis, John G.
- Architectural style: Prairie School
- MPS: Three-Story Apartment Buildings in Ogden, 1908–1928 MPS
- NRHP reference No.: 87002161
- Added to NRHP: December 31, 1987

The Fairview Apartments in Ogden, Utah is a complex of buildings built in 1916. It was listed on the National Register of Historic Places in 1987. There are two contributing buildings in the listing.
