= Newgate Mall =

- Location: Ogden, Utah, United States
- Coordinates: 41.19554°N 111.98194°W
- Address: 3651 Wall Avenue
- Opened: 1981
- Developer: Homart Development Company
- Manager: The Woodmont Company
- Num. of stores: 70+
- Num. of anchor tenants: 5 (3 open, 1 vacant, 1 partially occupied)
- Floor area: 725,148 square feet (67,000 m^{2})
- Floors: 1

Newgate Mall is an enclosed shopping mall in Ogden, Utah. Opened in 1981, it features Dillard's and a Cinemark movie theater. It is managed by The Woodmont Company.

== History ==
Homart Development Company built Newgate Mall in 1981. Its original anchor stores were Sears and Mervyn's. Sears had operated a store on the site prior to the mall opening, but moved to a new location upon construction of the mall while selling their previous location to Mervyn's. The mall was built by Homart Development Company, then a shopping mall development company owned by Sears.

Among its tenants was the first Chick-fil-A in Utah. Phar-Mor was added in February 1992, but closed only seven months later.

In 1994, Dillard's opened its second Utah store at the mall. Between then and 1995, over 100,000 square feet (9,300 m^{2}) of retail space was added, including Victoria's Secret, Lane Bryant, Bath & Body Works, Express, Inc., Famous Footwear, B. Dalton, and Applebee's. Another new tenant in this timespan was a larger location for Quilted Bear, a consignment shop that had previously occupied a smaller store within.

A year later, the former Phar-Mor became the first Oshman's in Utah. The store became Gart Sports in 2001, Sports Authority in 2006, and DownEast Home & Clothing in 2016. A 14 screen Cinemark "Tinseltown USA" movie theater was opened in 1998 to replace the mall's aging 4 screen cinema. Although Newgate Mall initially struggled with high vacancy, the mall's occupancy was boosted in the 2000s, particularly after Ogden City Mall (now The Junction) closed. Mervyn's closed in 2008 and in 2013 became Burlington Coat Factory which now goes by just Burlington. Sears closed in April 2018. Burlington closed in 2025.
