= Hughes W. Curtis =

American woodcarver and sculptor

Hughes William Curtis
- Born: November 1, 1904; Springville, Utah, U.S.
- Died: May 29, 1972 (aged 67)
- Resting place: Springville City Cemetery
- Occupations: Woodcarver, sculptor
- Spouse: Cecile Bame

Hughes W. Curtis (November 1, 1904 - May 29, 1972) was an American woodcarver, and clay and bronze sculptor.

== Life ==
Curtis was born on November 1, 1904, in Springville, Utah. He attended public schools in Springville, and he worked as a barber for four decades.

Curtis began his artistic career as a self-taught woodcarver by designing animals, guns, and whistles. He was trained as a clay sculptor by Cyrus Edwin Dallin, and he designed bronze figurines of the Old West. He built his own bronze foundry in Springville, and he joined the Associated Utah Artists.

His work can be seen at the Springville Museum of Art. Three of his miniature sculptures are held in the State of Utah Alice Merrill Horne Collection, but not currently on view. According to Utah Art, Utah Artists, "Curtis was the first sculptor in Utah to do truly western art, the mainstay of his oeuvre."

Curtis was a member of the Church of Jesus Christ of Latter-day Saints. He married Cecile Bame in 1963. He died on May 29, 1972, and he was buried in the Springville City Cemetery.
