= American Can Company of Utah Building Complex =

- U.S. National Register of Historic Places
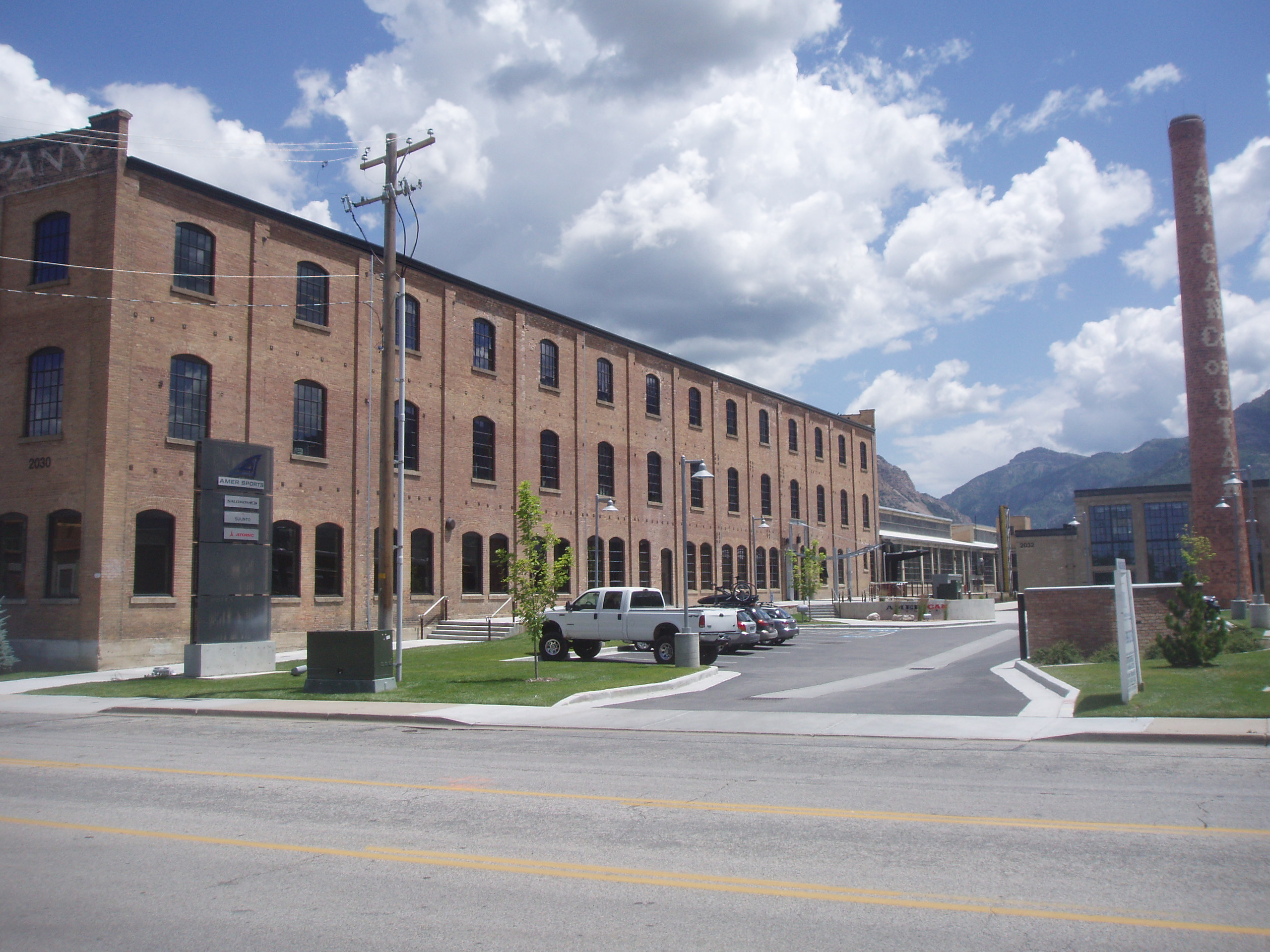

- Location within Utah Location within the United States
- Location: 2030 Lincoln Ave., Ogden City, Utah
- Coordinates: 41°13′49″N 111°58′28″W
- Area: 4.8 acres (1.9 ha)
- Built: 1914
- Architectural style: Early Commercial, Warehouse
- NRHP reference No.: 05001303
- Added to NRHP: November 16, 2005

The American Can Company of Utah Building Complex, now known as the AmeriCan Center, is a historic industrial site located in Ogden City, Utah. It was built in 1914 by the American Can Company. By the late 1940s, the plant employed 450 people and produced millions of cans for pea, potato, green bean and fruit crop farmers in Weber County. For a while, the company also manufactured steel beer cans. The company switched to making steel soft drink cans in the 1950s, but closed in 1979 with the advent of aluminum cans.

It was added to the National Register of Historic Places in 2005. It has since been converted to commercial space consisting of the U.S. headquarters of Amer Sports and the DaVinci Academy of Science and the Arts.

== See also ==
- National Register of Historic Places listings in Weber County, Utah
