= Historic 25th Street =

Historic district in Ogden, Utah, United States

- Lower 25th Street Historic District
- U.S. National Register of Historic Places
- U.S. Historic district
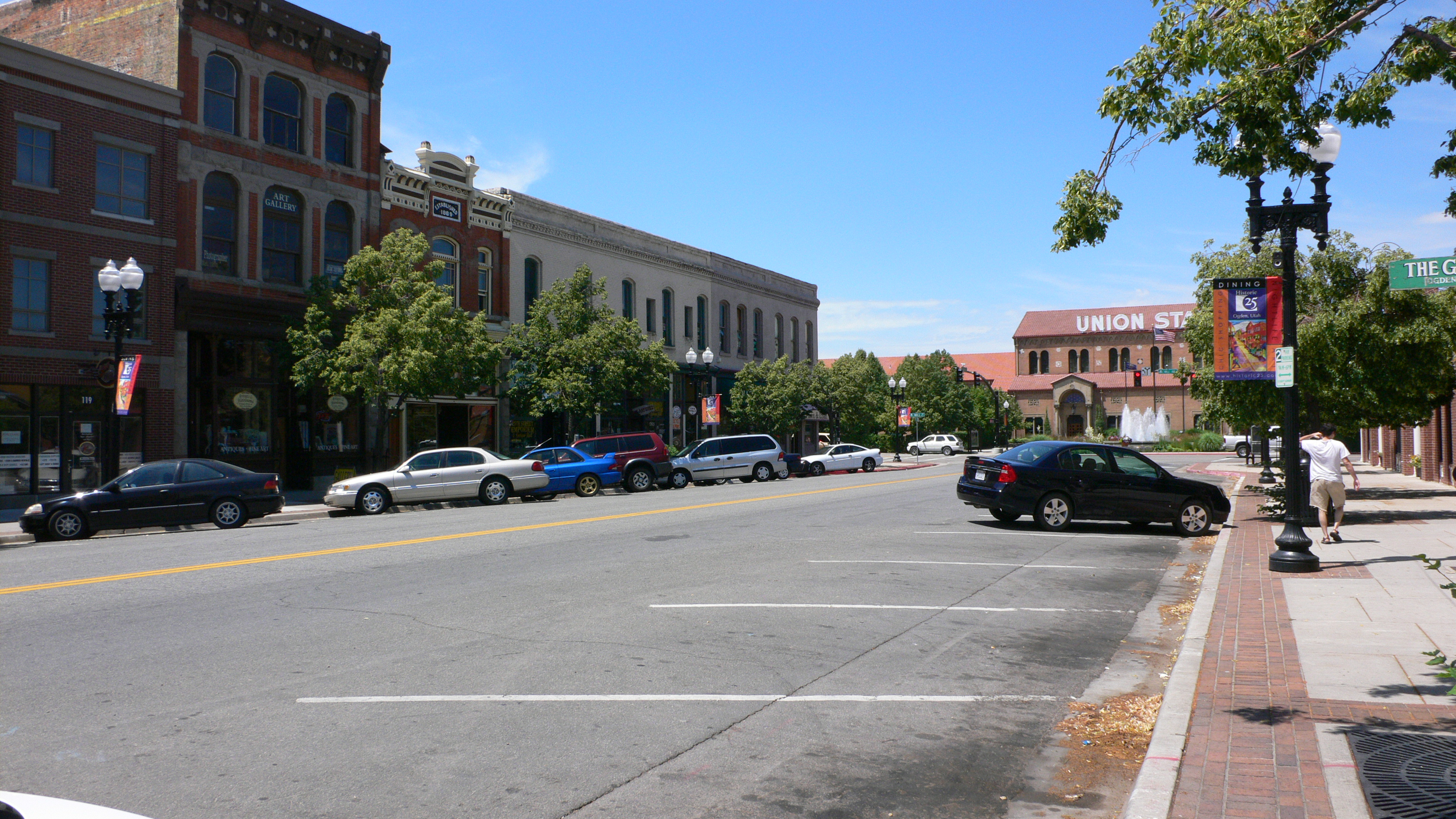
- Historic 25th Street in Ogden, July 2006

- Location within Utah Location within the United States
- Location: 25th Street (between Wall and Grant Avenues), 2522 Wall Avenue and 2471 Grant Avenue; Ogden, Utah; United States
- Coordinates: 41.218977°N 111.975746°W
- Area: 0 acres (0 ha)
- NRHP reference No.: 78003260
- Added to NRHP: January 31, 1978

Historic 25th Street is a historic district located in Ogden, Utah, United States, the lower portion of which is listed on the National Register of Historic Places (NRHP).

The Historic 25th Street neighborhood occupies three blocks of 25th Street, beginning at Wall Avenue (Utah State Route 204) on the west end and ending at Washington Boulevard (U.S. Route 89) on the east, with Lincoln and Grant Avenues transecting.

== History ==
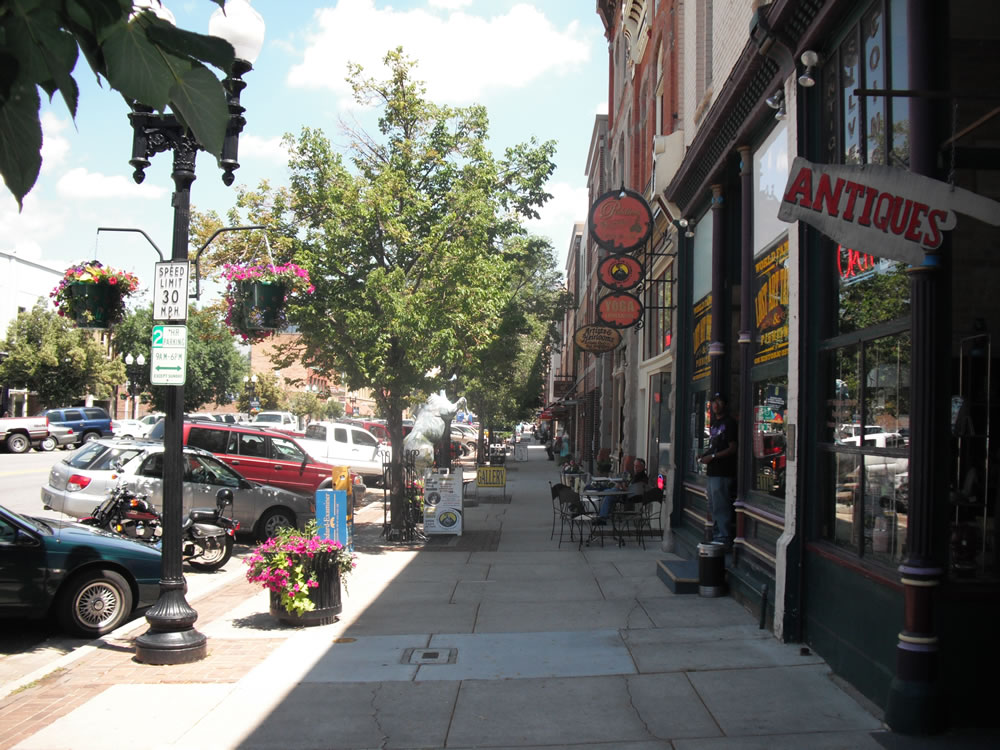
25th Street in Ogden

The history of 25th Street began with the opening of Union Station, at the west end of the street, during the completion of the First transcontinental railroad in 1869. Twenty-Fifth Street, originally known as 5th Street, lay a short distance away from the main depot where the rail lines converged. Many hotels and restaurants were built on 5th Street to give travelers an escape from the chaotic depot scene. Fifth Street became 25th Street in 1889, a year in which some historians claim the area gained its reputation for corruption and immorality. Later, another rail line, the Utah Northern Railroad, was built between Franklin, Idaho and Ogden. The Ogden Union Station Depot became the hub for the Utah Northern Railroad, and served as a major railroad junction. The original structure of the Union Station Depot was destroyed by a fire in 1923.

During the early 20th century, 25th Street was a center of activity in Ogden. Home to retail shops, restaurants, ice cream parlors, hotels, and laundries, the street was also a common site for illicit activities such as gambling, prostitution and narcotic sales. Popularly known as "Two-Bit Street", the area obtained such a seedy reputation that Al Capone is rumored to have said that Ogden was too wild a town for him. An urban legend tells of a system of tunnels that bootleggers created during prohibition to move alcohol from Union Station to the Bigelow-Ben Lomond Hotel located on the east end of the neighborhood.

In 1954, 25th Street was cleaned up as part of a citywide crime-reduction effort led by Mayor Lorin Farr (a descendant of Ogden's first mayor, Lorin Farr).

== Historic 25th Street today ==
The old style buildings and the history of 25th Street attract local patrons to it today. Historic 25th Street features restaurants, art galleries, retail shops, and hosts outdoor community events such as a farmers' market (July through September) and car shows. The rebuilt Union Station houses the Utah State Railroad Museums, the John M. Browning Arms Museum, and the Browning-Kimball Classic Car Museum. The street is also the location for the Ogden City Municipal Building and the Federal Courthouse. The street has become a tourist attraction for Ogden visitors wanting to explore the history of the western United States. Twenty-Fifth Street was also a filming site for the 2002 television series Everwood and the 1999 movie Drive Me Crazy.

== See also ==
- National Register of Historic Places listings in Weber County, Utah
