= Francis L. Horspool =

American painter

Francis Leroy Horspool
- Born: 1871; Ogden, Utah, U.S.
- Died: 1951 (aged 79–80); Salt Lake City, Utah, U.S.
- Resting place: Ogden City Cemetery, Ogden, Utah, U.S.
- Occupation: Painter

Francis L. Horspool (1871-1951) was an American painter from Utah. His work is in the permanent collection of the Springville Museum of Art.

== Life ==
Horspool was born in 1871 in Ogden, Utah. His father William was an immigrant from England who converted to the Church of Jesus Christ of Latter-day Saints.

Horspool initially worked for the railroad in Ogden, and he relocated to Salt Lake City in 1907. He worked as a civil engineer, salesman, and draftsman. By 1931, he had become a full-time painter.

Horspool died in 1951 in Salt Lake City, at the age of 80, and he was buried in the Ogden City Cemetery. His work is in the permanent collection of the Springville Museum of Art in Springville, Utah.
