= DaVinci Academy of Science and the Arts =

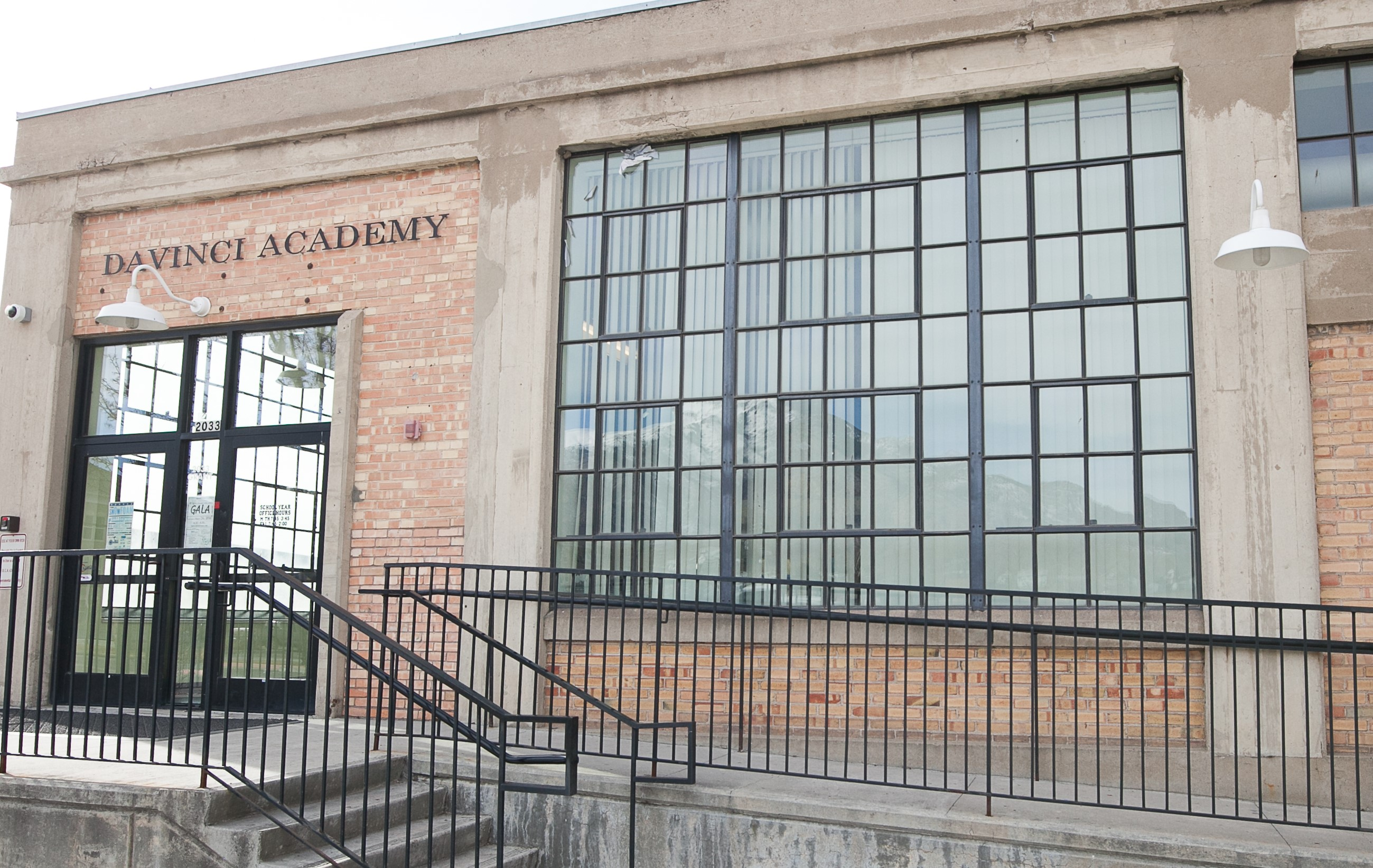
- The main entrance

Location
- 2033 Grant Avenue; Ogden, Utah 84404
- 41.230307°N 111.973343°W

Information
- School type: Charter
- Motto: Uniquely Dedicated to Success
- Established: April 15, 2004
- Locale: City Small (13)
- School district: DaVinci Academy
- NCES District ID: 4900065
- CEEB code: 450249
- NCES School ID: 490006500995
- Director: Fred Donaldson
- Principal: Erica Kortman (K-6)
- Principal: Naomi Anson (7-12)
- Staff: 15
- Teaching staff: 61.42 (FTE)
- Grades: K-12
- Enrollment: 1,269 (2023–2024)
- Average class size: 22
- Student to teacher ratio: 20.66
- Schedule type: Hybrid / mixed
- Classrooms: 42
- Colors: Royal Blue, Hunter Green and Vegas Gold
- Athletics conference: Utah School Sports Association
- Sports: Basketball, Cross Country, Soccer, Volleyball, and Bowling
- Mascot: Dragon
- Yearbook: Renaissance
- Website: davinciacademy.org

DaVinci Academy of Science and the Arts is a charter school district consisting of several campuses. It serves students of grades K-12 located in northern Utah. The main campus, including the administrative headquarters, is located in Ogden, Utah, United States.

== History ==
DaVinci Academy started operation on April 15, 2004. It is named after Leonardo da Vinci. Originally located in the Old Post Office Building, its main campus is now located in the American Can Company of Utah Building Complex in downtown Ogden. During its first year of operation, the student body consisted of the 9th and 10th grades. It has since expanded to include three other campuses that include an on-campus K–6 school and distance elementary school programs.

In the spring of 2007, the school had its first graduating class.

== Renovations ==
In late 2008, the school board decided to purchase the building north of the school. In the beginning of the 2009−10 academic year, the building was opened for 7th−9th graders.

The school board then expanded into two more buildings at different locations in the downtown Ogden area. These buildings serve as an on-site elementary school and a headquarters for the online program.

The elementary program has also expanded to include a campus in Kaysville, Utah.

== Academics ==
The charter of the school focuses on Performing Arts and Science.

== Athletics ==
There are several sports played by the High School students at the school. Basketball, Bowling, Cross Country Running, Soccer, and Volleyball are the sports in which students participate. DaVinci Academy competes in the Utah School Sports Association with other charter and private schools in the Wasatch Front region of Utah.
