= Defense Depot Ogden =

U.S. military installation in Ogden, Utah, US

Coordinates: 41°15′50.27″N 111°59′57.07″W

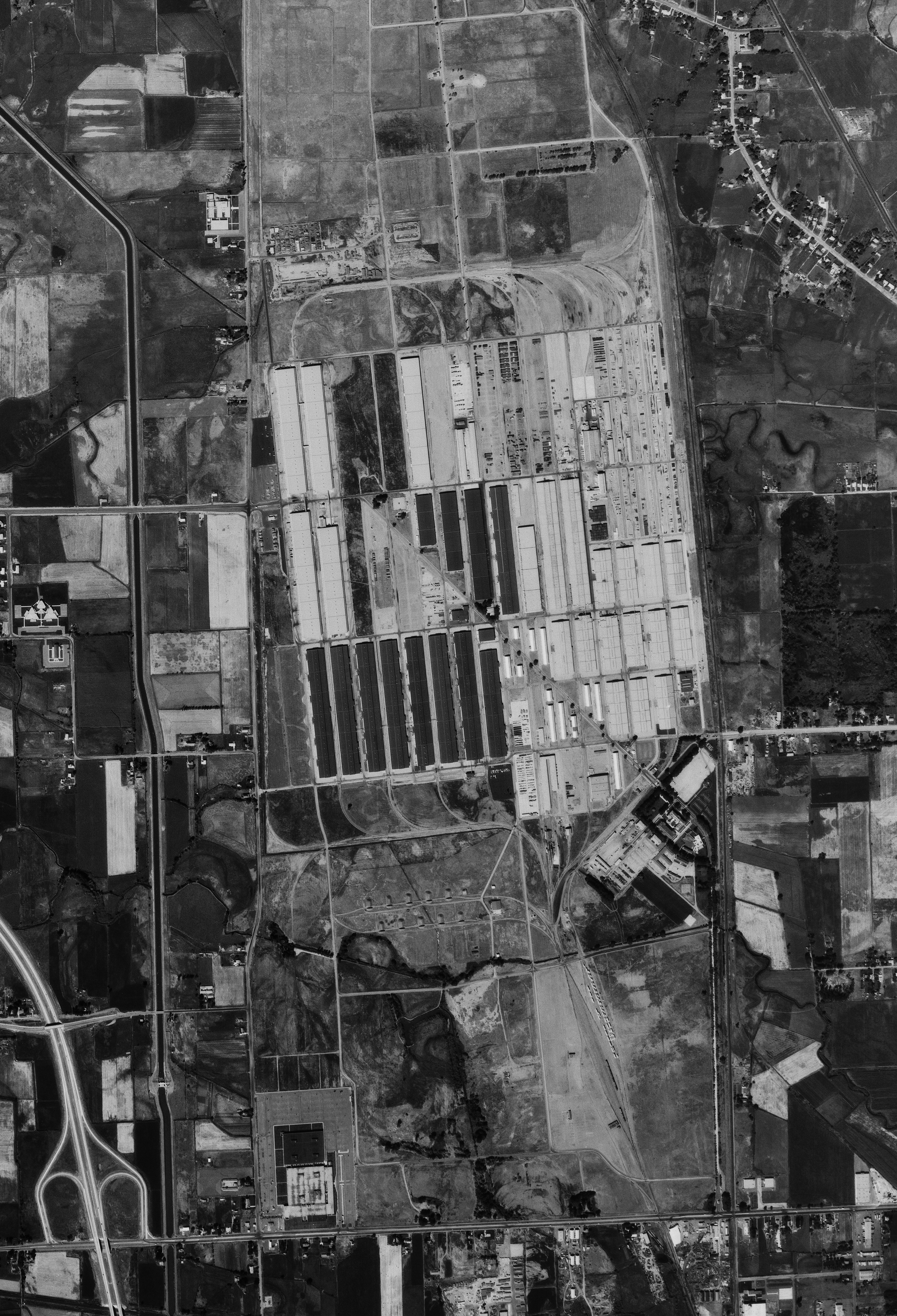
Defense Depot Ogden in 1971

Defense Depot Ogden was a U.S. military installation located in Ogden, Utah, United States. It encompassed 1,139 acres (5 km^{2}) with its southwest corner located on 12th Street (1200 South) and Tomlinson Road (1200 West). Its eastern border is the old Utah Northern Railroad, now owned by the Union Pacific Railroad.

== History ==
Prior to the establishment of what was known as the Utah General Depot on September 15, 1941, the underlying land was used for pasture and farmland. The Defense Depot Ogden Utah (DDOU) was one of seven similar facilities located around the nation. The property entered the ownership of the United States Army, under the command of the Defense Logistics Agency (DLA), an agency of the Department of Defense (DOD). The DDOU was used as logistical supply and administrative support for military installations and other DOD and federal agencies. The mission included the receipt, storage, maintenance, inventory and issue of items that included food, clothing, textiles, packages, petroleum products, pesticides, pressurized gases and general medical, industrial, construction and electronic supplies.

During World War II, the DDOU was also used as an internment camp for both German and Italian prisoners of war.

The Depot had an Officers' Club that allowed Department of the Army civilian employees to enjoy the facility. A set of military houses between the front gate and the Officers' Club made it feel like a neighborhood. There was also an AAFES store, as well as clothing sales. The commander changed from one service to another with each change but the commander was always a pay grade O-6 colonel or captain.

The DDOU was listed in the Base Realignment and Closure Act (BRAC) of 1995. As a result, the base ceased its functions on September 30, 1997. Management of the facilities was then handed over to the Hill Air Force Base DLA, at which time the official name of the facility changed to Defense Depot Hill Utah (DDHU) Ogden Site.

== Business Depot Ogden ==
As early as 1995, the City of Ogden appointed a committee to research the development of the DDHU. Much of this work was towards the conversion of the area into a commercial and industrial park. The Ogden Local Redevelopment Authority (OLRA) is charged with ensuring that the City of Ogden's DDOU Reuse Plan is properly implemented. The transfer of ownership was completed in 2003, giving the facility to Ogden City.

After nearly ten years, and at the expense of $115 million, the DDOU/DDHU became the Business Depot Ogden (BDO). The transition from a former military installation to a commercial park involved many changes to the street layout and buildings.

The local Ogden newspaper, the Ogden Standard-Examiner, moved into a remodeled administrative building in the northeastern side of the BDO, investing in a new and much larger printing press for the new facilities.

== Present ==
The City of Ogden and Boyer Co. entered an agreement early in the conversion process that forced any and all profit from the BDO to be diverted directly into investments in the facilities. This has been instrumental in the continuing expansion and development of the BDO. In October 2006, this agreement will expire, giving Ogden City and Boyer Co. even shares of future profits. In 2004, $7 million in revenue was seen, with an expected increase in 2005.

Several notable Federal facilities continue to operate in the BDO. The Internal Revenue Service (IRS) maintains a large facility on site as part of its local network of buildings in the Ogden area. The United States Army Reserve continues to operate in its facilities, and a Deployable Medical Systems (DEPMEDS) unit, responsible for the refurbishment and supply of medical units, operated until 2002, when it moved to Hill Air Force Base.

Commercial facilities on site include, among others, Autoliv, Edge Products, Barnes Aerospace, Hersheys, Homedepot, Setpoint, TreeHouse Foods, ICON Fitness, Kenco Logistic Services, and the Standard Examiner.

Two new buildings totaling 280,000 square feet (26,000 m^{2}) and nearing completion have already been partially leased. New road and construction area for several industrial buildings along the park's western border, and a planned 500,000-square-foot (50,000 m^{2}) cross-dock warehouse will be built on a plot near the center of the park.

== Future ==
The BDO is part of a larger plan to entice business to the Ogden area. As of 2005, there are already more employees in the BDO than there were when the facility was still operating as a defense depot. Both Ogden City and Weber County are investing heavily in the hopes that the BDO will be an important part of the health of the city and county for the next 50 years.

Boyer Co. has plans for both commercial and retail offerings along the busy 12th street border. This should include everything from restaurants to office buildings.

== Environmental impact ==
Due to soil and groundwater contamination at the site, the U.S. Environmental Protection Agency designated DDOU as a Superfund site and placed it on the National Priorities List in 1987. Site cleanup activities began in 1989 and continued through the 1990s. Groundwater and soil monitoring continues at the site. The U.S. Agency for Toxic Substances and Disease Registry (ATSDR) conducted a public health assessment of the site and concluded in 1992 that DDOU poses "no apparent public health hazard."

Included in the site history was the storage of 2,328, 55-gallon drums of hazardous waste in 1993. This was part of a RCRA permit issued by the Utah Solid and Hazardous Waste Control Board. These drums were stored in a facility called the Conforming Storage Building. Storage of these materials ended in 1997, and the building was closed.

As part of the transfer of ownership to the OLRA, two Finding of Suitability to Transfer (FOST) documents were developed and approved by state and federal agencies. A total of 544 acres (2.2 km^{2}) of uncontaminated ground were transferred to the OLRA. Further FOST activities are ongoing, and should eventually result in a nearly complete transfer of properties.
