= Bank of Utah =

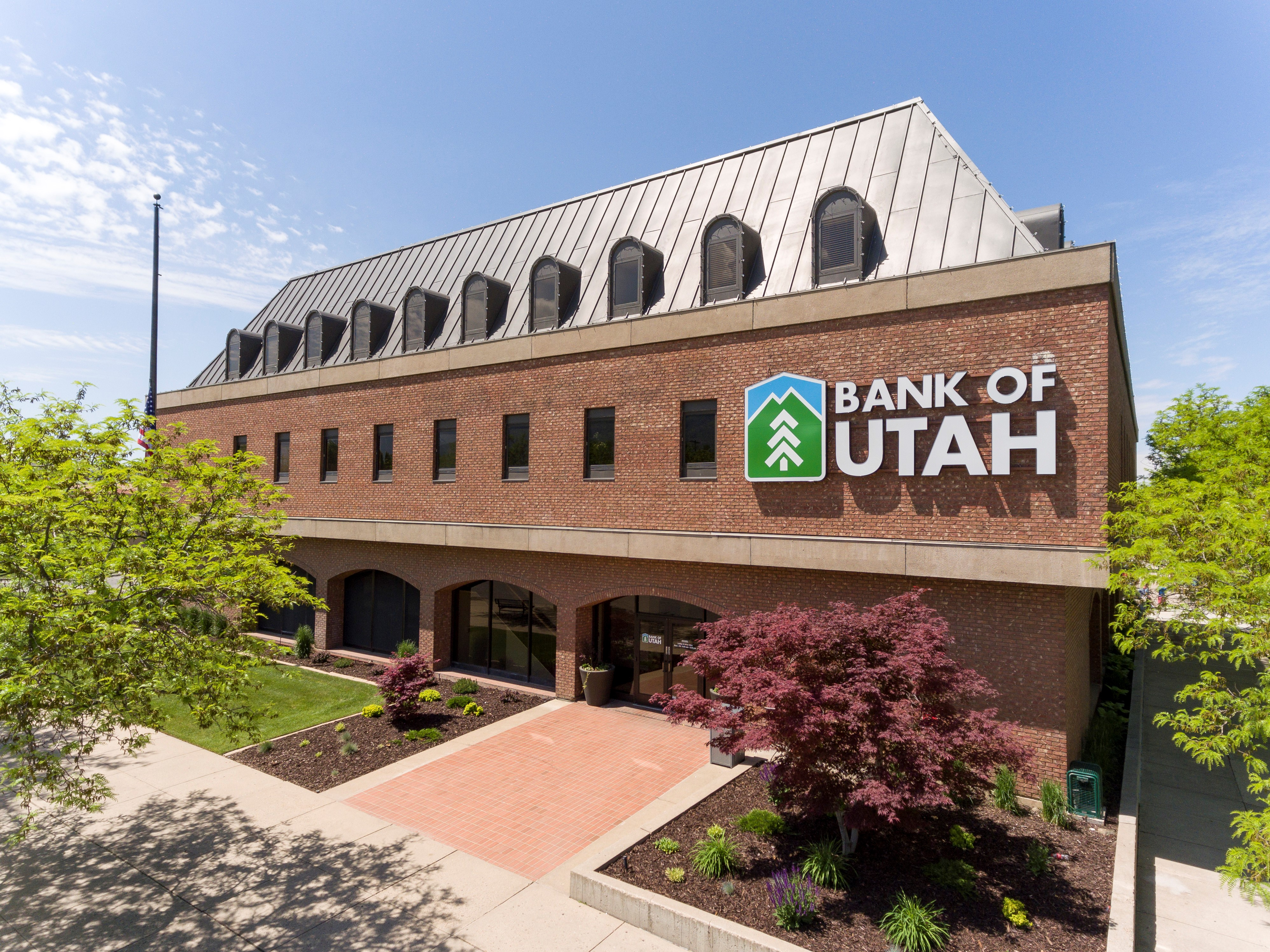
- Bank of Utah corporate offices Ogden, Utah
- Industry: Banking
- Founded: December 1, 1952; 73 years ago
- Headquarters: Ogden, Weber County, Utah
- Key people: Benjamin F. Browning (Chairman of the Board)
- Products: Financial services
- Number of employees: 400+ (2024)
- Divisions: Personal Banking; Home Loans; Business Banking; Treasury Management; Commercial Loans; Wealth Management; Private Banking; Personal Trust; Corporate Trust
- Website: BankofUtah.com

Bank of Utah is a federally-insured community bank, with corporate headquarters in Ogden, Utah. It is a member of the Utah Bankers Association (UBA), the American Bankers Association (ABA), and the Federal Deposit Insurance Corporation (FDIC).

With just over $3.6 billion in assets, Bank of Utah places in the top 8.43% of banks in the nation for total assets and the top 7.68% for net income.

Bank of Utah has just over 400 employees at 20 full-service branches throughout Utah, additional trust offices in Ogden and Salt Lake City, and additional mortgage offices in Logan, and Price.

== History ==
Ogden businessman Frank M. Browning founded Bank of Utah on Dec. 1, 1952, with 16 employees and less than $1 million in assets. Today, the bank remains locally owned and operated, and the Browning family remains involved in the bank with Benjamin F. Browning as chairman of the board and CEO, and Jonathan W. Browning as secretary to the board.

Historically, Bank of Utah became the first bank in the state to issue a credit card, called the "Cred-O-Matic Shopping Plan." It was also the first Utah bank to become a "motor bank" by adding a drive-up teller window to its building.

Since its creation, Bank of Utah has acquired the following banks: Bank of Ben Lomond (1974), Bank of Brigham City (1978), Bank of Northern Utah (1978), First Commerce Bank (1999) and American Bank of Commerce (AmBank) (2018).

== Business ==
=== Personal Banking ===
Offering checking accounts, savings accounts, certificates of deposits (CDs), individual retirement accounts (IRA) and personal health savings accounts (HSA).

=== Business Banking ===
Offering checking and savings accounts, debit and credit cards, treasury management services and merchant services.

=== Home Loans ===
Offering a variety of financing for homebuyers and homeowners, including loans to buy a home, build a home or purchase a lot; options to refinance an existing home loan; home equity lines of credit; and reverse mortgages.

=== Consumer and Personal Lending ===
Offering financing to make special purchases, cover expenses or consolidate debt, including auto loans, RV loans, CD- and savings-secured loans, and unsecured loans.

=== Commercial Lending ===
Offering commercial real estate loans, SBA, business lines of credit and equipment loans to businesses.

=== Personal Trust and Investments ===
Services offered include: fiduciary services, estate and financial planning, investment management and self-directed IRAs

=== Corporate Trust ===
Offering a broad spectrum of services, including escrows, owner trusts, security trusts, indenture trusts, life settlements, paying agent and collateral agent roles. The bank is one of the largest providers of aircraft owner trusts in the world, a commonly used, Federal Aviation Administration-compliant method of registering aircraft in the U.S.
