= The Junction (Ogden, Utah) =

Mixed-use precinct in Utah, United States

Coordinates: 41.2246942°N 111.973813°W

Location
- Interactive map of The Junction
- Location: Ogden, Utah

Area
  - Total: 8.1 ha (20 acres)

The Junction is a 20-acre (8.1 ha) entertainment, retail, office, and residential complex in downtown Ogden, Utah, built on the site of the former Ogden City Mall. Its development has been coordinated and subsidized by Ogden City, in an effort to revitalize the city center for economic and cultural growth. The city has worked in partnership with the Boyer Company, The Church of Jesus Christ of Latter-day Saints, Wells Fargo, and other private companies. The Junction borrows its name from Ogden's historic nickname "Junction City".

== Description ==
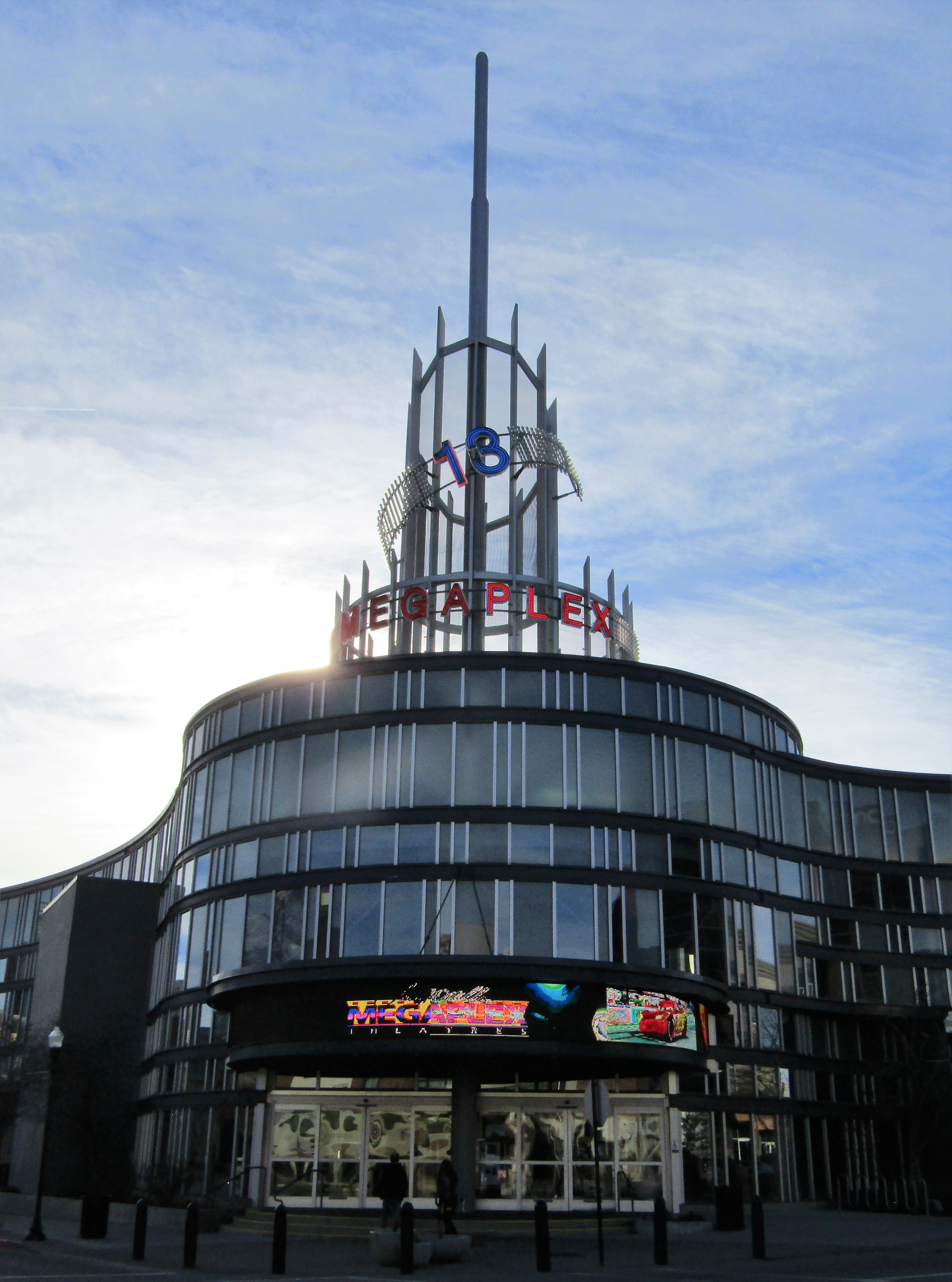
Megaplex Theatres at The Junction, December 2018

The Junction's main anchors are the Megaplex 13 theater and the adjacent Salomon Center, which houses Skinny Dogz arcade, EoS Fitness, FlowRider pool, iRock climbing wall, iFly indoor skydiving, and a few small restaurants. These facilities opened in June 2007. Already open by then was the nearby Elizabeth Stewart Treehouse Museum, a children's museum providing nearly 30,000 square feet (2,800 m^{2}) of interactive exhibits for children, ages two to twelve, and their families. The remainder of The Junction consists of two office buildings, several restaurants, a large parking garage, and a number of condominium and apartment buildings with retail space on the ground level.

Lindquist Field, home of the Ogden Raptors minor league baseball team, is located on the western edge of the complex.

As an economic investment for Ogden City, The Junction has been controversial. Skeptics point out that The Junction's tax revenues have fallen far short of what was originally promised, and that taxpayers will be subsidizing payments on The Junction's bonded debt for many years to come. On the other hand, proponents argue that The Junction has enhanced downtown Ogden and indirectly helped other downtown businesses to prosper.

== History ==
The site was originally occupied by Ogden City Mall from 1980 to 2002. Its tenants included The Bon Marché (later Lamonts), J. C. Penney, Meier & Frank (previously Weinstock's and ZCMI), and Nordstrom.

== In popular culture ==
The site was used as a location, when it was occupied by the Ogden City Mall, for American singer Tiffany's video of her song "I Think We're Alone Now". She is seen on the video at one of the mall's entrances and then performing in it.

The site is also the former site of the Hi-Fi Shop, location of the 1974 Hi-Fi murders. The shop was demolished to make way for the Ogden City Mall.
