= Stan Poray =

Polish-American painter (1888–1948)

Stanislaus Poray
- Born: April 10, 1888; Kraków, Poland
- Died: October 18, 1948 (aged 60); New York City, U.S.
- Resting place: Holy Cross Cemetery, Culver City
- Education: Academy of Fine Arts, Poland
- Spouse: Maria Krzyzanowska

Stanislaus Pociecha Poray (1888–1948) was a Polish-American artist, noted for his orientalist landscapes and still lifes. Born to wealthy Count Michael Poray in Kraków, he studied at the Polish Academy of Fine Arts and later in Paris. He travelled widely in Russia, marrying Maria Krzyzanowska in Riga, Latvia before moving to Moscow and later Tomsk where he became art director of the First Art Theater in 1918. Fleeing the Russian Revolution, the couple passed through Vladivostok and then lived in Japan for three years where he painted the Imperial family. They then immigrated to the United States and settled in Hollywood, Los Angeles in 1921 in a reproduction of a Japanese temple at 1421 El Centro Ave, just blocks from the Hollywood Walk of Fame and Pantages Theater.

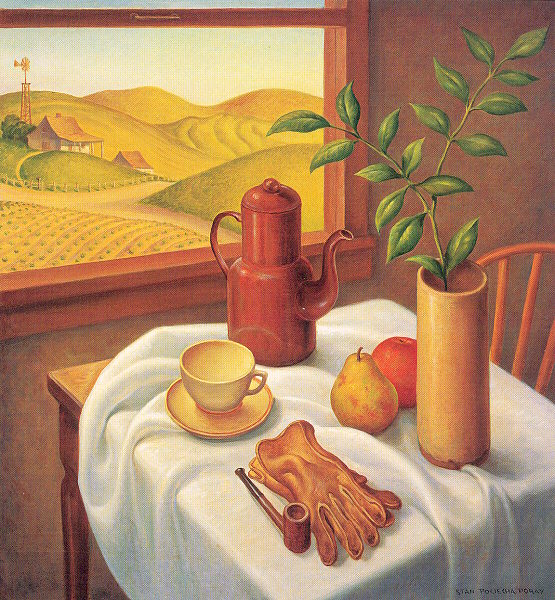
Neighbor's Farm, oil painting by Poray

Poray had numerous solo art shows over the next 27 years, including at the Springville Museum in Utah in 1929, several different shows at the Stendhal Galleries, the Upstairs Art Gallery in Hollywood, and was still headlining exhibitions at the Ebell Club the year of his death. On October 18, 1948, following a three-month trip to show his art in Caracas, Venezuela, Poray died at a New York City airport on his way back to Los Angeles. A rosary and mass were said for him in Los Angeles Polish churches, and he was buried at nearby Holy Cross Cemetery.

== Works ==
- Rhythm (1933) at the Harvard Art Museums
- Iridescent Glass at the Detroit Institute of Arts
