= Ogden, Utah =

City in Utah, United States

Ogden
- City
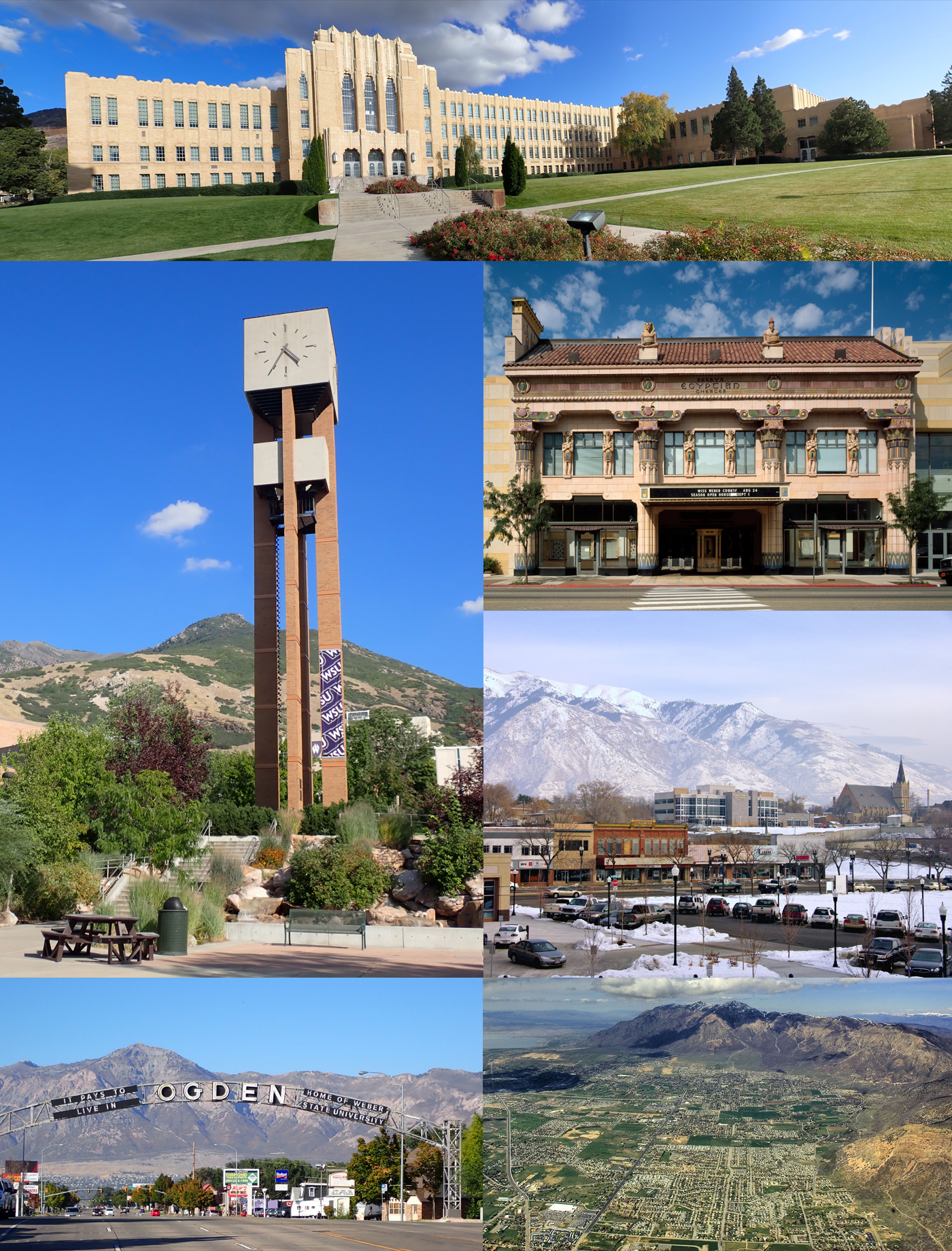
- From top left to bottom right: Ogden High School, Weber State University Bell Tower, Peery's Egyptian Theater, Downtown, Gantry Sign, aerial view

- Flag
- Nickname: Junction City
- Motto: Still Untamed
- Interactive map of Ogden
- Location within Utah Location within the United States
- Coordinates: 41°13′40″N 111°58′06″W
- Country: United States
- State: Utah
- County: Weber
- Settled: 1844
- Incorporated: February 6, 1851 (As Brownsville)
- Named for: Peter Skene Ogden

Government
  - Type: Council-Mayor

Area
  - City: 27.55 sq mi (71.35 km^{2})
  - Land: 27.55 sq mi (71.35 km^{2})
  - Water: 0.0039 sq mi (0.01 km^{2})
- Elevation: 4,341 ft (1,323 m)

Population (2020)
  - City: 87,321
  - Density: 3,169.7/sq mi (1,223.84/km^{2})
  - Urban: 608,857 (US: 69th)
  - Urban density: 2,864/sq mi (1,105.8/km^{2})
  - Metro: 694,863 (US: 83rd)
- Demonym: Ogdenite
- Time zone: UTC−7 (MST)
  - Summer (DST): UTC−6 (MDT)
- ZIP Codes: 84201, 84244, 844xx
- Area codes: 385, 801
- FIPS code: 49-55980
- GNIS feature ID: 2411305
- Website: www.ogdencity.gov

Ogden (/ˈɒɡ.dən/ OG-dən) is a city in and the county seat of Weber County, Utah, United States, located approximately 10 miles (16 km) east of the Great Salt Lake and 40 miles (64 km) north of Salt Lake City. The population was 87,321 in 2020, according to the United States Census Bureau, making it Utah's eighth largest city. The city served as a major railway hub through much of its history, and still handles a great deal of freight rail traffic which makes it a convenient location for manufacturing and commerce. Ogden is also known for its many historic buildings, proximity to the Wasatch Mountains, and as the location of Weber State University.

Ogden is a principal city of the Ogden-Clearfield metropolitan area, which includes all of Weber, Morgan, Davis, and Box Elder counties. The 2010 Census placed the Metro population at 597,159. In 2010, Forbes rated the Metro as America's 6th best place to raise a family. Ogden has had a sister city relationship to Hof in Bavaria, Germany, since 1954.

== History ==
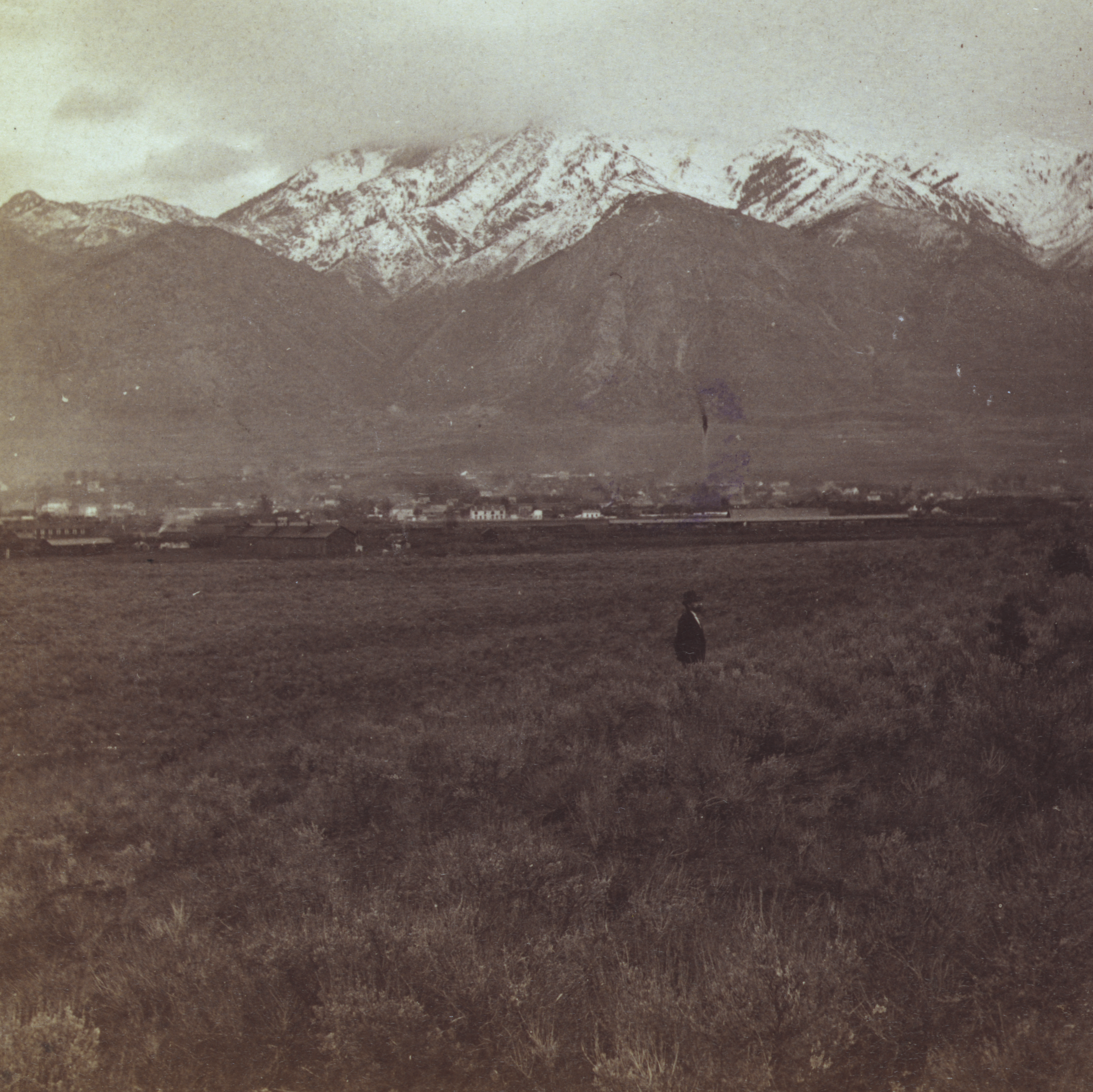
Ogden c. 1874

Originally named Fort Buenaventura, Ogden was the first permanent settlement by people of European descent in what is now Utah. It was established by the trapper Miles Goodyear in 1846 about a mile west of where downtown Ogden sits today.

In November 1847, Captain James Brown purchased all the land now comprising Weber County together with some livestock and Fort Buenaventura for $3,000 (equivalent to $104,000 in 2025). The land was conveyed to Captain Brown in a Mexican Land Grant, this area being at that time a part of Mexico. The settlement was then called Brownsville, after Captain James Brown, but was later named Ogden for a brigade leader of the Hudson's Bay Company, Peter Skene Ogden, who had trapped in the Weber Valley a generation earlier. There is some confusion about which "Ogden" was the first to set foot in the area. A Samuel Ogden traveled through the western United States on an exploration trip in 1818. The site of the original Fort Buenaventura is now a Weber County park.

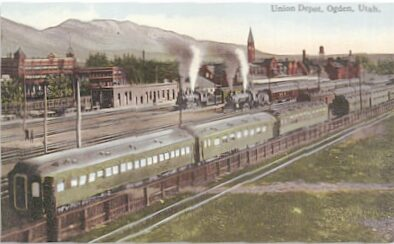
Westbound passengers changed cars at Ogden, from Union Pacific to Southern Pacific, which took them to California

Ogden is the closest sizable city to the Golden Spike location at Promontory Summit, Utah, where the first transcontinental railroad was joined in 1869. It was known as a major passenger railroad junction owing to its location along major east–west and north–south routes, prompting the local chamber of commerce to adopt the motto, "You can't get anywhere without coming to Ogden." Railroad passengers traveling west to San Francisco from the eastern United States typically passed through Ogden (and not through the larger Salt Lake City to the south). However, Amtrak, the national passenger rail system, no longer serves Ogden. Passengers who want to travel to and from Ogden by rail must travel via FrontRunner commuter rail to Salt Lake City and Provo. Renowned Danish impressionistic writer Herman Bang died in Ogden in 1912 during a lecture tour in the United States.

Because Ogden had historically been Utah's second-largest city, it is home to a large number of historic buildings. However, by the 1980s, several Salt Lake City suburbs and Provo had surpassed Ogden in population.

The Defense Depot Ogden Utah operated in Ogden from 1941 to 1997. Some of its 1,128 acres (456 ha) have been converted into a commercial and industrial park called the Business Depot Ogden, colloquially known as "BDO".

Two ships in the United States Navy have been named after Ogden: USS Ogden (PF-39) in 1943, and USS Ogden (LPD-5) in 1964. On September 17, 2024, the National Park Service announced that Ogden had been named a World War II Heritage City.

== Geography ==
=== Topography ===
Ogden is located at the foot of the Wasatch Mountains. This is at about the same latitude as Benevento in Campania in southern Italy.

According to the United States Census Bureau, the city has an area of 26.6 square miles (69 km^{2}), all land. Elevations in the city range from about 4,300 to 5,000 feet (1,300 to 1,500 m) above sea level.

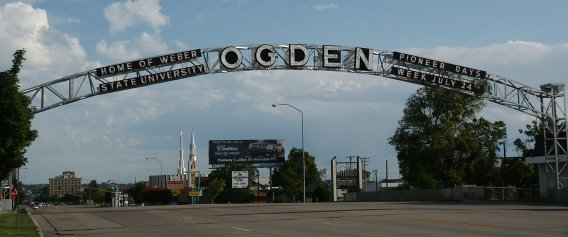
"Ogden" sign over Washington Boulevard at the Ogden River; toward downtown

The Ogden and Weber Rivers, which originate in the mountains to the east, flow through the city and meet at a confluence just west of the city limits. Pineview Dam is in the Ogden River Canyon 7 miles (11 km) east of Ogden. The reservoir behind the dam provides over 110,000 acre⋅ft (140 million m^{3}) of water storage and water recreation for the area.

Prominent mountain peaks near Ogden include Mount Ogden to the east and Ben Lomond to the north.

=== Streetscape ===
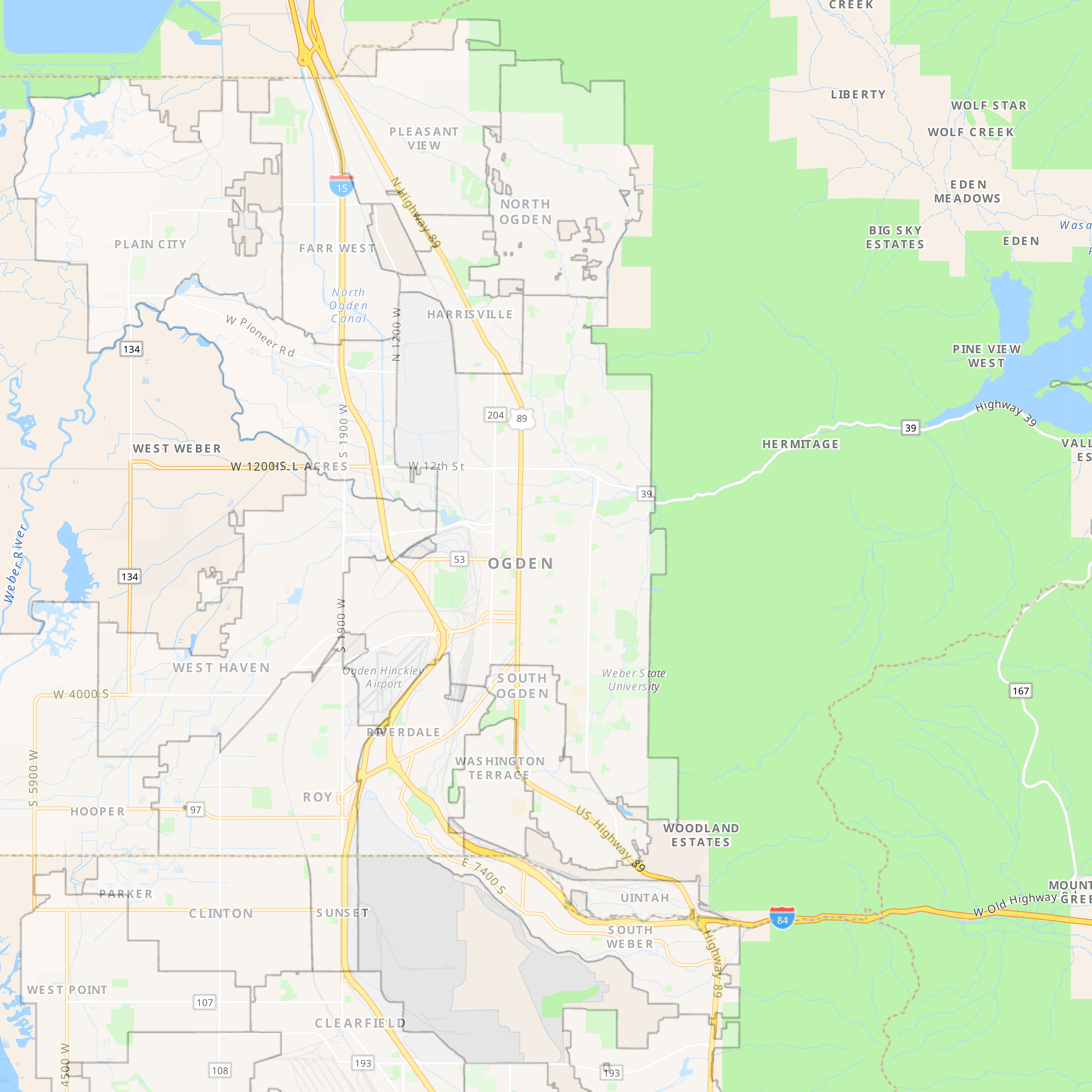
Ogden and its surrounding area

From south to west to north, Ogden's neighboring towns are South Ogden, Roy, West Haven, Marriott-Slaterville, Farr West, Harrisville, Pleasant View and North Ogden. The city is - like many others in the US - characterized by a spacious street grid with many blocks. The streets are numbered from north to south, which is expressed in the corresponding street names. By extending the numbers with directions ("E" for east and "W" for west) their relative relation to the central point is made clear. In the center of the city, the blocks from Union Station along 25th Street, the north-to-south oriented cross streets are named after former U.S. presidents such as Lincoln Avenue, Grant Avenue, Washington Boulevard, Adams Avenue, Jefferson Avenue, and Madison Avenue. The central connecting street in north–south orientation is Harrison Boulevard. The city area is divided into six districts: in the North End, including West Ogden, Downtown and East Central; in the East, including East Bench and Shadow Valley.

=== Climate ===
According to the Köppen climate classification, Ogden experiences either a Mediterranean climate (Csa) or a humid continental climate (Dsa) depending on which variant of the system is used. Summers are hot and relatively dry, with highs frequently reaching 95 °F (35 °C), with a few days per year reaching 100 °F (38 °C). Rain is provided in the form of infrequent thunderstorms during summer, usually between late July and mid-September during the height of monsoon season. The Pacific storm season usually lasts from about October through May, with precipitation reaching its peak in spring. Snow usually first occurs in late October or early November, with the last occurring sometime in April.

Climate data for Ogden, Utah, 1991–2020 normals, extremes 1897–present
Month	Jan	Feb	Mar	Apr	May	Jun	Jul	Aug	Sep	Oct	Nov	Dec	Year
Record high °F (°C)	62 (17)	67 (19)	79 (26)	87 (31)	98 (37)	106 (41)	106 (41)	104 (40)	104 (40)	89 (32)	76 (24)	65 (18)	106 (41)
Mean maximum °F (°C)	48.4 (9.1)	56.6 (13.7)	69.7 (20.9)	77.8 (25.4)	87.6 (30.9)	96.2 (35.7)	100.3 (37.9)	97.4 (36.3)	91.0 (32.8)	79.4 (26.3)	66.0 (18.9)	53.1 (11.7)	100.6 (38.1)
Mean daily maximum °F (°C)	35.7 (2.1)	41.9 (5.5)	52.7 (11.5)	59.6 (15.3)	70.1 (21.2)	81.5 (27.5)	91.3 (32.9)	88.7 (31.5)	77.8 (25.4)	62.7 (17.1)	48.5 (9.2)	36.8 (2.7)	62.3 (16.8)
Daily mean °F (°C)	28.5 (−1.9)	33.4 (0.8)	42.9 (6.1)	49.1 (9.5)	58.6 (14.8)	68.4 (20.2)	78.0 (25.6)	75.8 (24.3)	65.4 (18.6)	51.7 (10.9)	39.5 (4.2)	29.6 (−1.3)	51.7 (11.0)
Mean daily minimum °F (°C)	21.2 (−6.0)	24.9 (−3.9)	33.1 (0.6)	38.6 (3.7)	47.1 (8.4)	55.3 (12.9)	64.8 (18.2)	62.9 (17.2)	53.0 (11.7)	40.8 (4.9)	30.5 (−0.8)	22.4 (−5.3)	41.2 (5.1)
Mean minimum °F (°C)	7.1 (−13.8)	10.9 (−11.7)	21.1 (−6.1)	27.2 (−2.7)	33.8 (1.0)	42.5 (5.8)	55.8 (13.2)	52.3 (11.3)	39.7 (4.3)	27.6 (−2.4)	17.3 (−8.2)	8.3 (−13.2)	3.6 (−15.8)
Record low °F (°C)	−23 (−31)	−23 (−31)	5 (−15)	6 (−14)	26 (−3)	29 (−2)	36 (2)	33 (1)	20 (−7)	8 (−13)	0 (−18)	−20 (−29)	−23 (−31)
Average precipitation inches (mm)	1.53 (39)	1.55 (39)	1.71 (43)	1.97 (50)	2.17 (55)	1.12 (28)	0.35 (8.9)	0.72 (18)	1.06 (27)	1.68 (43)	1.17 (30)	1.33 (34)	16.36 (414.9)
Average precipitation days (≥ 0.01 in)	8.8	8.6	9.1	9.9	8.9	4.8	3.0	3.9	5.5	6.7	7.3	9.4	85.9
Source 1: NOAA
Source 2: XMACIS2

== Demographics ==
Historical population
Census	Pop.	Note	%±
1850	500		—
1860	1,464		192.8%
1870	3,127		113.6%
1880	6,069		94.1%
1890	14,889		145.3%
1900	16,313		9.6%
1910	25,580		56.8%
1920	32,804		28.2%
1930	40,272		22.8%
1940	43,688		8.5%
1950	57,112		30.7%
1960	70,197		22.9%
1970	69,478		−1.0%
1980	64,407		−7.3%
1990	63,909		−0.8%
2000	77,226		20.8%
2010	82,825		7.3%
2020	87,321		5.4%

=== Racial and ethnic composition ===
Ogden, Utah – Racial and ethnic composition Note: the US Census treats Hispanic/Latino as an ethnic category. This table excludes Latinos from the racial categories and assigns them to a separate category. Hispanics/Latinos may be of any race.
Race / Ethnicity (NH = Non-Hispanic)	Pop. 2000	Pop. 2010	Pop. 2020	% 2000	% 2010	% 2020
White alone (NH)	54,216	52,557	52,743	70.20%	63.46%	60.40%
Black or African American alone (NH)	1,630	1,553	1,759	2.11%	1.88%	2.01%
Native American or Alaska Native alone (NH)	681	701	696	0.88%	0.85%	0.80%
Asian alone (NH)	1,023	966	1,197	1.32%	1.17%	1.37%
Pacific Islander alone (NH)	109	241	331	0.14%	0.29%	0.38%
Other race alone (NH)	69	150	404	0.09%	0.18%	0.46%
Mixed race or Multiracial (NH)	1,245	1,717	3,293	1.61%	2.07%	3.77%
Hispanic or Latino (any race)	18,253	24,940	26,898	23.64%	30.11%	30.80%
Total	77,226	82,825	87,321	100.00%	100.00%	100.00%

=== 2020 census ===
As of the 2020 census, Ogden had a population of 87,321. The median age was 31.8 years. 25.3% of residents were under the age of 18 and 11.2% of residents were 65 years of age or older. For every 100 females there were 103.9 males, and for every 100 females age 18 and over there were 102.7 males age 18 and over.

99.9% of residents lived in urban areas, while 0.1% lived in rural areas.

There were 31,781 households in Ogden, of which 33.2% had children under the age of 18 living in them. Of all households, 41.0% were married-couple households, 23.5% were households with a male householder and no spouse or partner present, and 27.1% were households with a female householder and no spouse or partner present. About 29.7% of all households were made up of individuals and 9.6% had someone living alone who was 65 years of age or older.

There were 33,962 housing units, of which 6.4% were vacant. The homeowner vacancy rate was 1.5% and the rental vacancy rate was 6.2%.

Racial composition as of the 2020 census
Race	Number	Percent
White	58,704	67.2%
Black or African American	1,980	2.3%
American Indian and Alaska Native	1,488	1.7%
Asian	1,321	1.5%
Native Hawaiian and Other Pacific Islander	368	0.4%
Some other race	12,992	14.9%
Two or more races	10,468	12.0%
Hispanic or Latino (of any race)	26,898	30.8%

=== 2010 census ===
As of the census of 2010, there were 82,825 people living in the city. The population density was 2,899.2 people per square mile (1,119.4 people/km^{2}). There were 29,763 housing units at an average density of 1,117.4 units per square mile (431.4 units/km^{2}). The racial makeup of the city was 75.02% White, 2.24% African American, 1.40% Native American, 1.20% Asian, 0.3% Pacific Islander, 3.7% from other races, and 3.7% from two or more races. Hispanic or Latino of any race were 23.64% of the population.

=== 2000 census ===
As of the census of 2000, there were 77,226 people, 27,384 households, and 18,402 families living in the city. The population density was 2,899.2 people per square mile (1,119.4 people/km^{2}). There were 29,763 housing units at an average density of 1,117.4 units per square mile (431.4 units/km^{2}). The racial makeup of the city was 79.01% White, 2.31% African American, 1.20% Native American, 1.43% Asian, 0.17% Pacific Islander, 12.95% from other races, and 2.93% from two or more races. Hispanic or Latino residents of any race were 23.64% of the population.

There were 27,384 households, out of which 35.2% had children under the age of 18 living with them, 48.4% were married couples living together, 13.1% had a female householder with no husband present, and 32.8% were non-families. 26.2% of all households were made up of individuals, and 9.6% had someone living alone who was 65 years of age or older. The average household size was 2.73 and the average family size was 3.32.

In the city 28.8% of the population was under the age of 18, 14.6% from 18 to 24, 29.0% from 25 to 44, 16.3% from 45 to 64, and 11.3% who were 65 years of age or older. The median age was 29 years. For every 100 females, there were 102.3 males. For every 100 females age 18 and over, there were 100.5 males.

The median income for a household in the city was $34,047, and the median income for a family was $38,950. Males had a median income of $29,006 versus $22,132 for females. The per capita income for the city was $16,632. About 12.6% of families and 16.5% of the population were below the poverty line, including 20.2% of those under age 18 and 9.3% of those age 65 or over.

=== 2017 ===
As of 2017 the largest self-identified ancestry groups in Ogden, Utah were

- English (15.3%)
- German (9.8%)
- American (6.7%)
- Irish (6.6%)
- Scottish (3.7%)
- Italian (3.4%)
- Danish (2.9%)
- French (2.1%)
- Swedish (1.9%)
- Welsh (1.7%)

== Government and politics ==
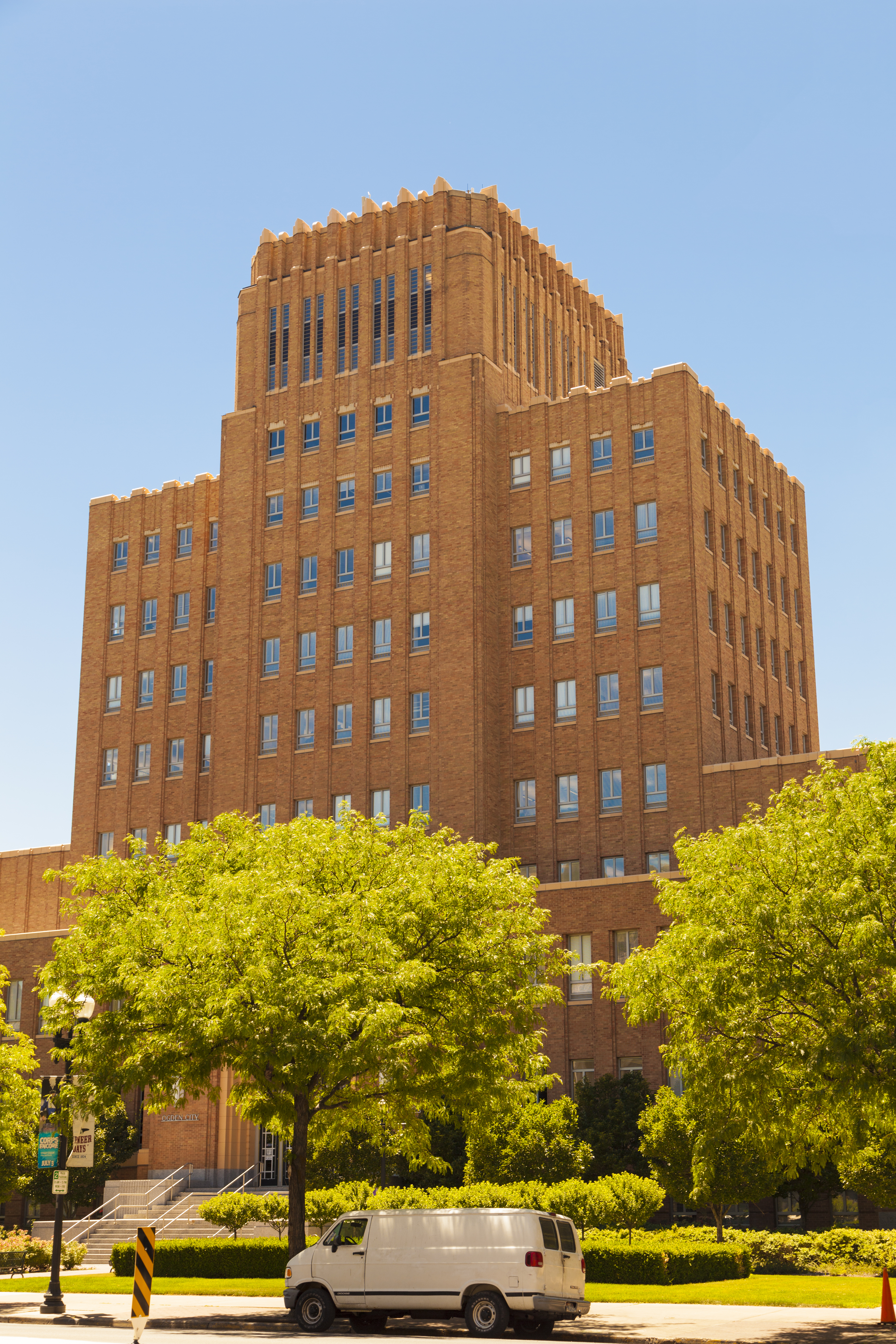
Ogden City Municipal Building

Ogden is governed under the mayor-council form of government, in which the full-time mayor serves as an executive while the seven-member part-time council serves as the legislative branch. All these elected officials serve four-year terms, with elections occurring in odd-numbered years and terms beginning in January of even-numbered years.

The mayor, Ben Nadolski, took office on January 2, 2024. The city council members are Richard Hyer(Chair), Dave Graf(Vice-Chair), Flor Lopez, Kevin Lundell, Jeremy Peterson, Ken Richey, and Alicia Washington. Four of the council members represent the city's four municipal districts, while the other three (Washington, Lundell, and Peterson) are elected at-large by voters from the entire city.

The Ogden City government operates on a budget of $267 million per year and employs over 600 full-time workers. In addition to providing the usual municipal services, the government promotes business and economic development. The city operates a redevelopment agency (RDA), with the city council acting as the RDA governing board and the mayor as its executive director. The RDA's activity has increased since its establishment in 1969, with tax increment revenues at about $10 million per year and an outstanding debt of over $50 million. Designated redevelopment districts now cover nearly all of Ogden's central business districts, as are Business Depot Ogden and several other industrial areas in the western parts of the city.

Much of the recent political discourse in Ogden has focused on controversial government-sponsored development projects in the downtown area, including the Ogden Eccles Conference Center, Lindquist Field, The Junction, the Ogden River Project, and other proposals that have not moved forward. A proposed streetcar connecting downtown to Weber State University has attracted considerable attention but only limited support. A major controversy flared up in 2005–07 when the mayor and many others pushed unsuccessfully for construction of a luxury residential development on public land in Ogden's foothills and a new ski resort in the mountains above the city, to be accessed by a pair of aerial gondolas. Other local political concerns include Ogden's relatively high tax and utility rates, efforts to fight crime, allegations of government corruption, and challenges facing the Ogden City schools.

=== Federal representation ===
Ogden is located in Utah's 1st congressional district. In the 118th United States Congress, Ogden is represented by Blake Moore.

== Education ==
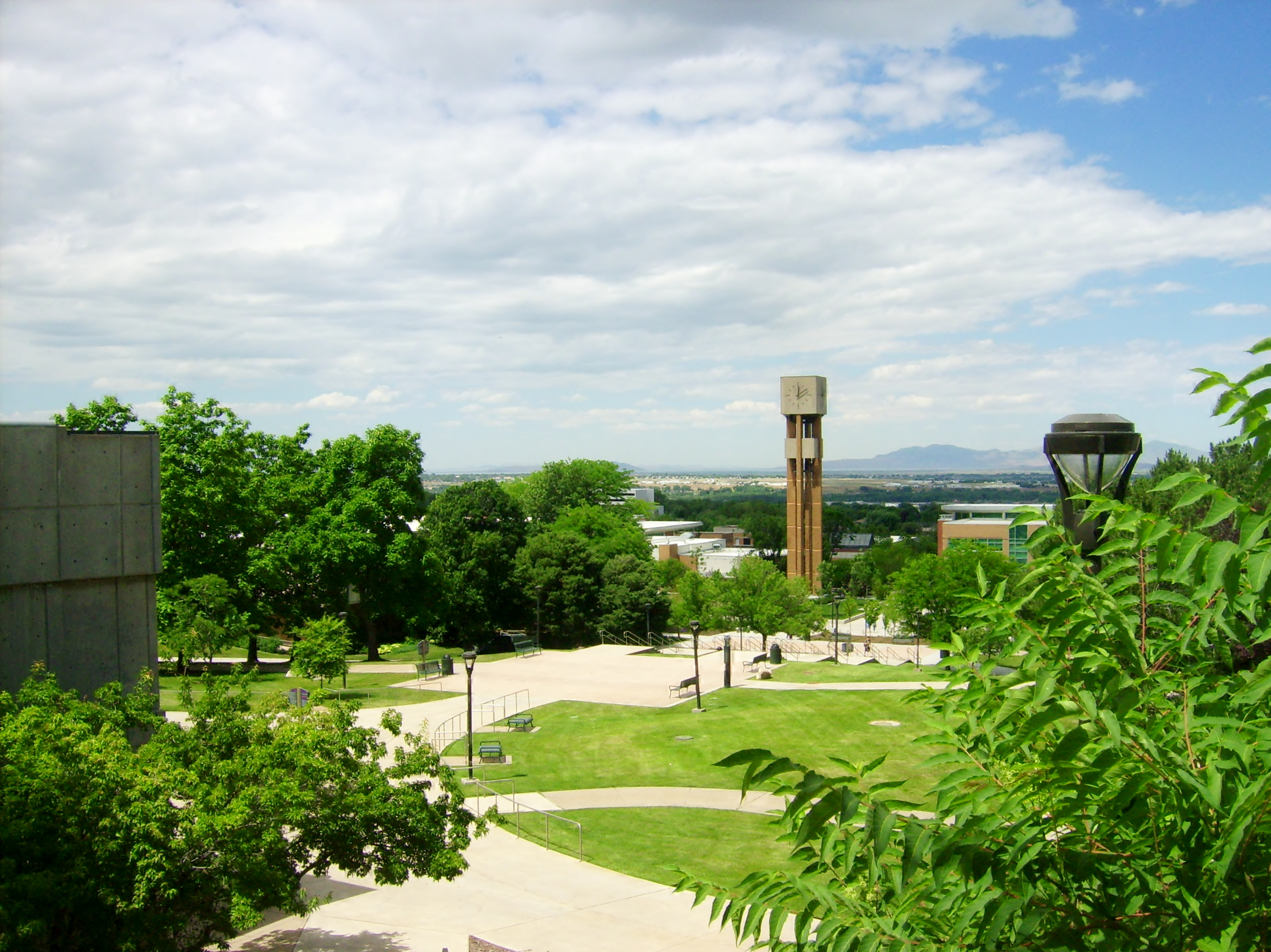
Weber State University's main campus in Ogden

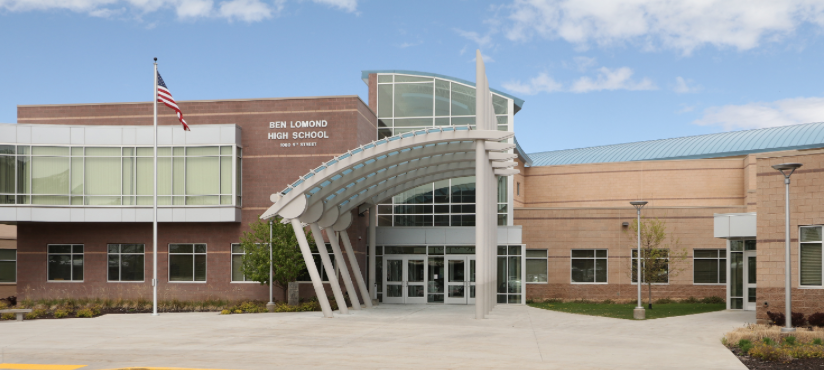
Ben Lomond High School

=== K–12 ===
- Ogden City School District is the public school district in the city, with its boundaries mirroring the city limits. It operates Ogden High School and Ben Lomond High School. It formerly operated Canyon High School.
- Weber School District serves areas outside of the city limits, even if they have "Ogden, Utah" postal addresses.
- DaVinci Academy of Science and the Arts is an elementary and secondary charter school system.
- Utah Schools for the Deaf and the Blind's boarding facility is in the city.
- The Roman Catholic Diocese of Salt Lake City operates and/or sponsors Catholic schools including Saint Joseph Catholic High School.

=== Tertiary level ===
- Weber State University
- Ogden-Weber Applied Technology College
- Stevens–Henager College

Ogden is home to the Ogden Botanical Gardens, which serve as an extension location and distance education center for Utah State University.

== Economy ==
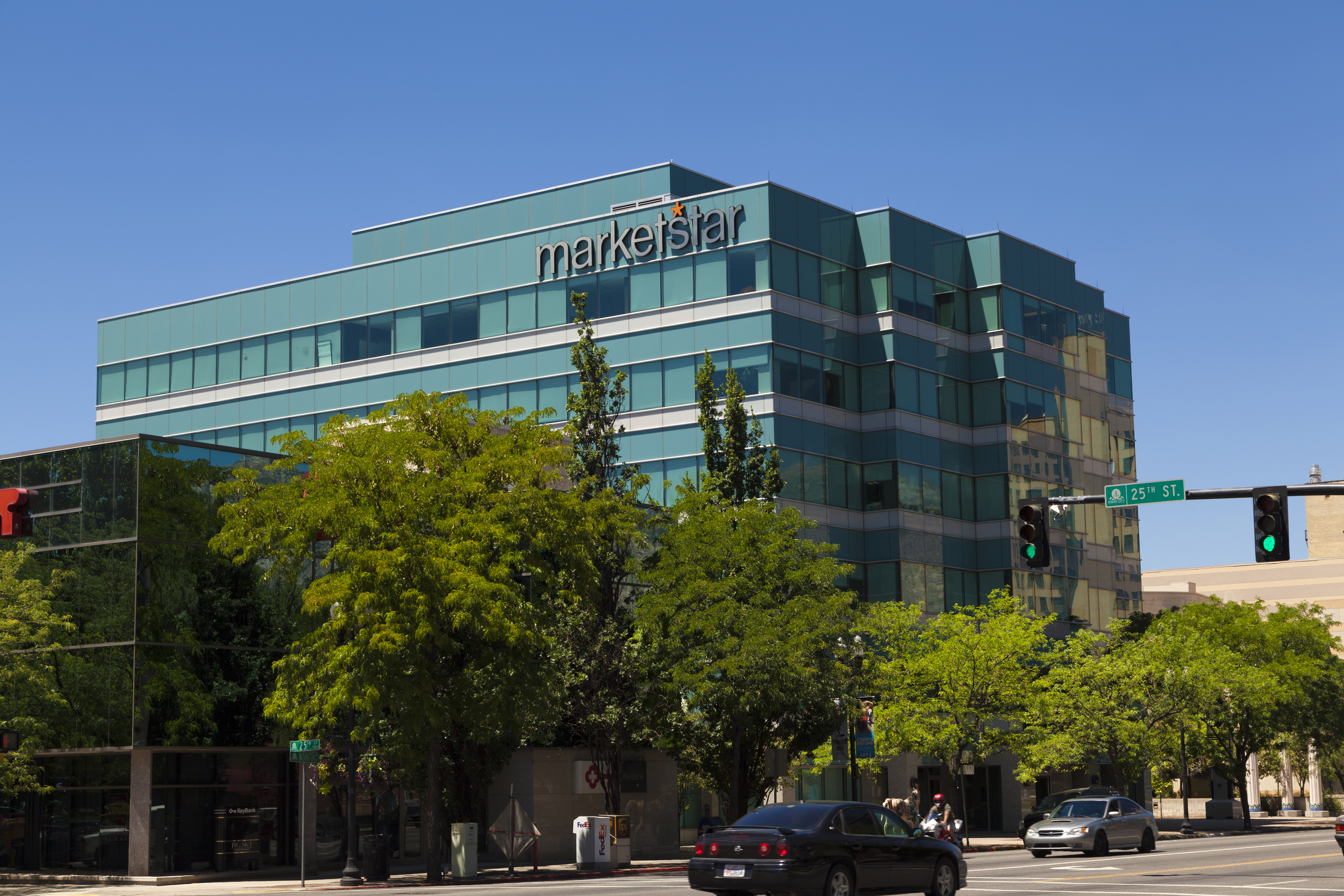
MarketStar headquarters in Ogden, Utah

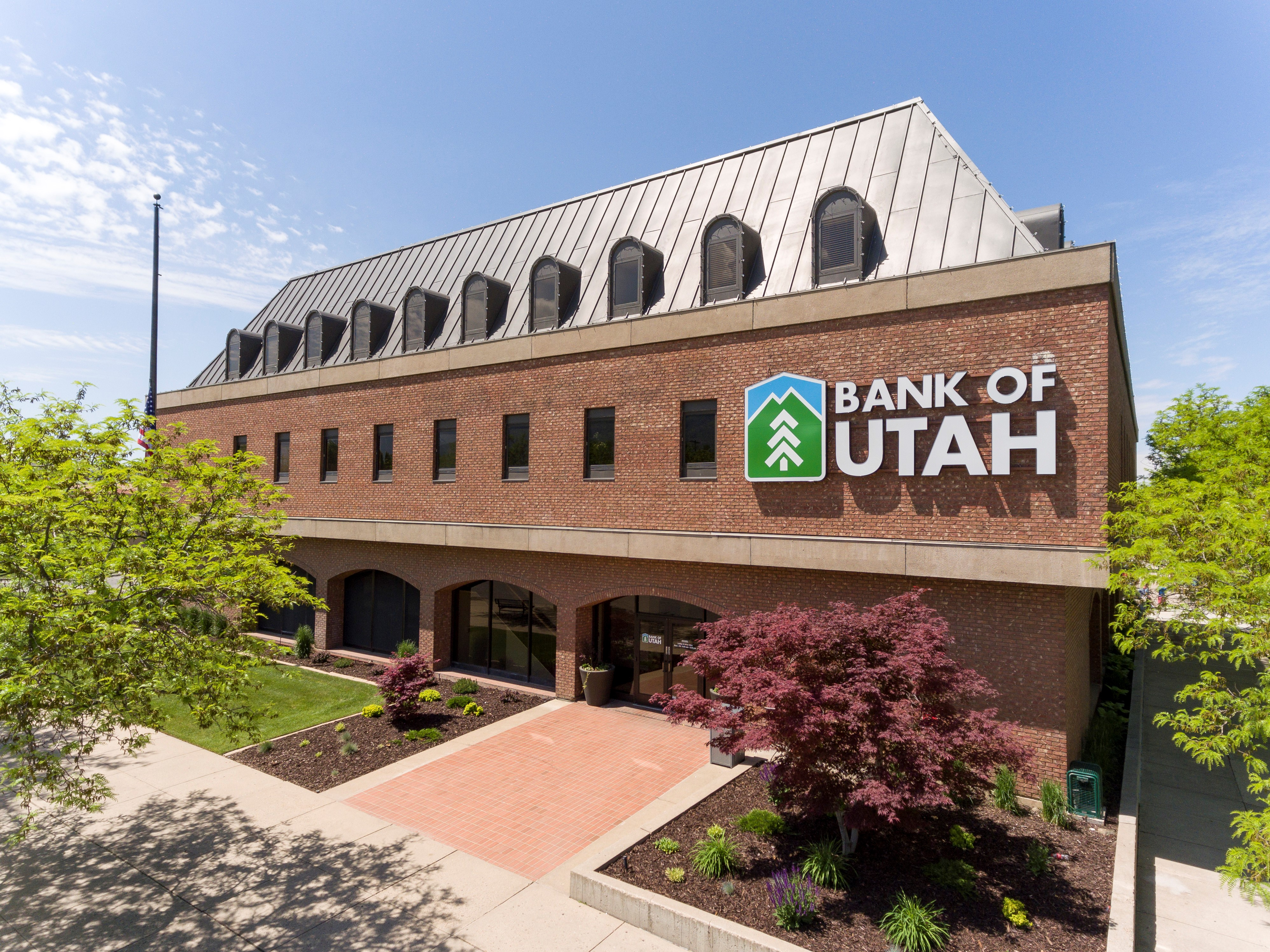
Bank of Utah was founded in Ogden in 1952 and maintains its corporate headquarters in Ogden

As the principal city of the 2nd largest MSA in Utah, Ogden serves as an economic hub for the northern part of the state. Much of the central city is occupied by offices of federal, state, county, and municipal government entities. The Internal Revenue Service has a large regional facility in Ogden and is the city's largest employer with over 5,000 employees. Other large employers include McKay Dee Hospital, Weber State University, Ogden City School District, Autoliv, and Fresenius.

In 2013, Ogden ranked No. 16 on Forbes' list of the Best Places for Business and Careers.

The western parts of the city have several industrial areas. The largest is Business Depot Ogden, a former Army depot that was restructured to be a 1,000-plus acre business park.

=== Headquarters ===
- MarketStar – Sales and marketing company.
- ENVE Composites - high-end bicycle components
- Autoliv North America – Automotive safety equipment.
- Bank of Utah – Banking services.
- America First Credit Union – Banking services.
- Kadince – Software services.
- Goode Ski Technologies — Carbon fiber skiing equipment.

== Transportation ==
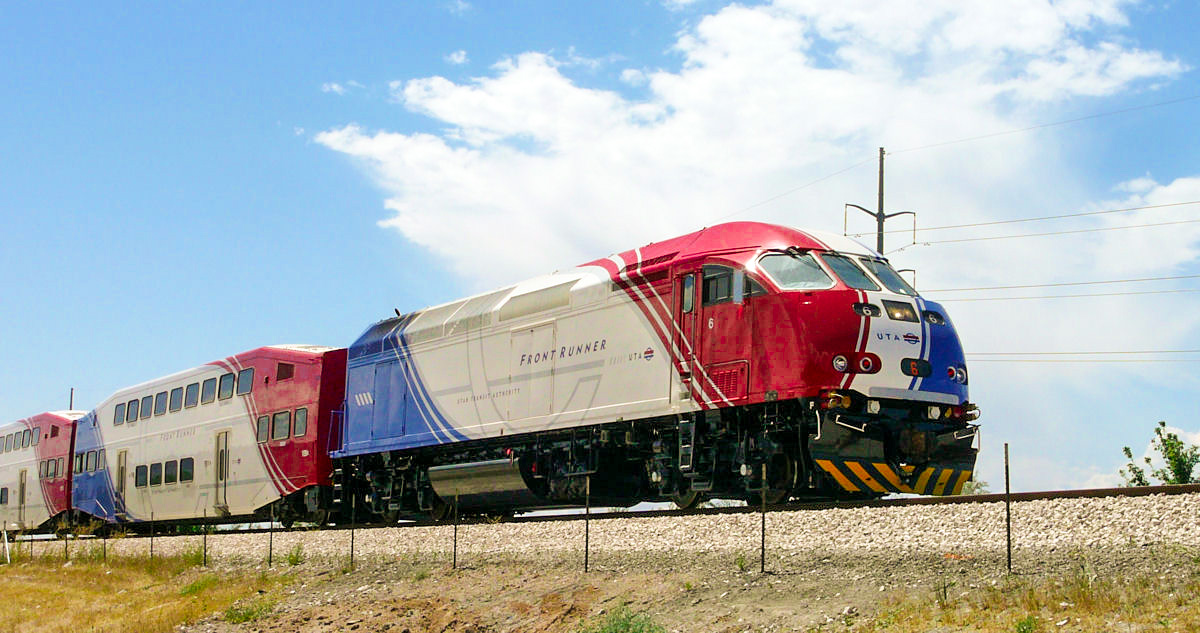
FrontRunner commuter rail, which runs between Provo and Ogden, via Salt Lake City

Interstates 15 and 84 serve the city. I-84 runs east–west through the southern suburbs, merging with I-15 near Riverdale. I-15 runs north–south near the city's western edge and provides connections to the rest of the Wasatch Front and beyond. Ogden is served directly by exits 341, 342, 343, and 344. US-89 enters the city from the south, running through the city as Washington Boulevard, which serves as the main street of Ogden. It then continues north to Brigham City. State Route 39 runs east–west through the city as 12th Street, and continues eastward through Ogden Canyon providing access to Pineview Reservoir and the mountain and ski resort town of Huntsville.

The Utah Transit Authority (UTA) operates several services within and to/from Ogden. The OGX bus line operates between Ogden Central Station and Weber State University (WSU). Additional bus routes service Ogden, and connect Ogden to Brigham City, the northernmost extension of UTA's bus system, and to Weber and Davis counties.

Ogden Central Station is serviced by UTA's commuter rail system, FrontRunner, which, in addition to several bus lines, provides a direct route from the Ogden to Salt Lake City. Greyhound also services Ogden via Ogden Central station via highway I-15.

Amtrak service is provided with a bus connection running to/from Salt Lake City, where there are daily California Zephyr trains west to the Oakland, California area and east to Chicago, Illinois. Amtrak trains do not serve Ogden directly. Historically, Ogden Union Station served as a hub for frequent trains going northwest to Portland, Oregon, and Seattle, Washington, and east to Chicago. Amtrak ended the Pioneer in 1997. In the same year, Amtrak ended the Los Angeles to Chicago Desert Wind.

Ogden–Hinckley Airport, Utah's busiest municipal airport, is in the southwest portion of the city. The only commercial service is operated by Breeze Airways with nonstop service to Orange County, California. Allegiant Air offered commercial service from Ogden to Phoenix and Mesa, Arizona, Avelo Airlines served Burbank, California, while Utah Airways offers charter service to many of the West's national parks. As of May 2022, both Allegiant and Avelo ceased service, citing rising costs and dropping ticket sales, in addition to expanded availability of air carriers at Salt Lake International airport just 35 minutes south.

== Sites of interest ==
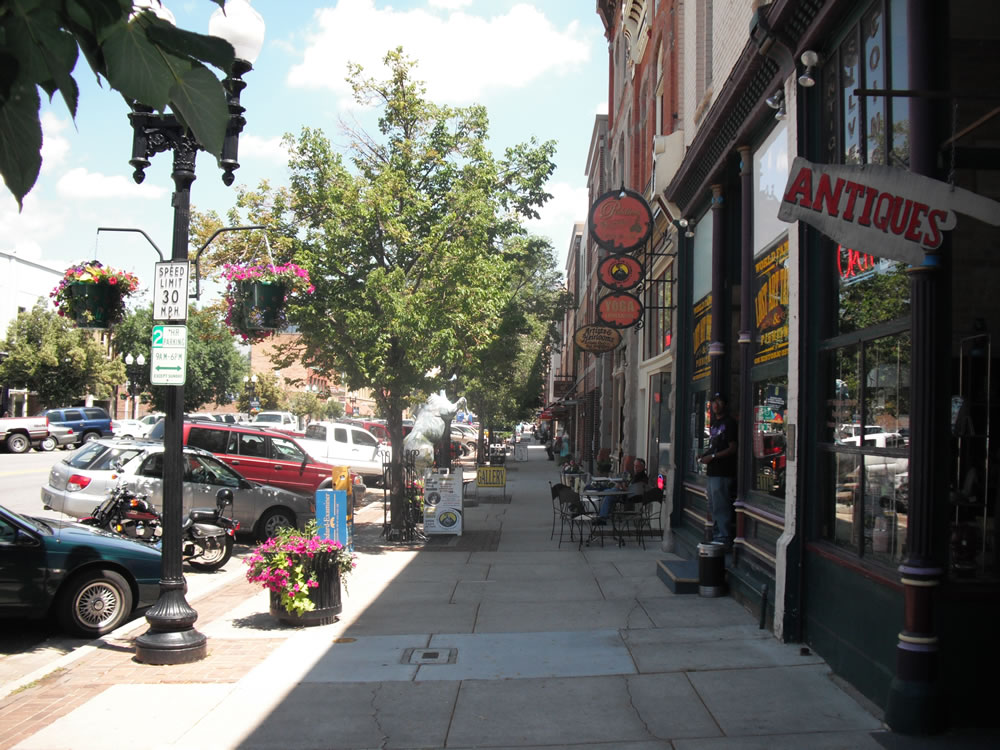
Historic 25th Street, Downtown

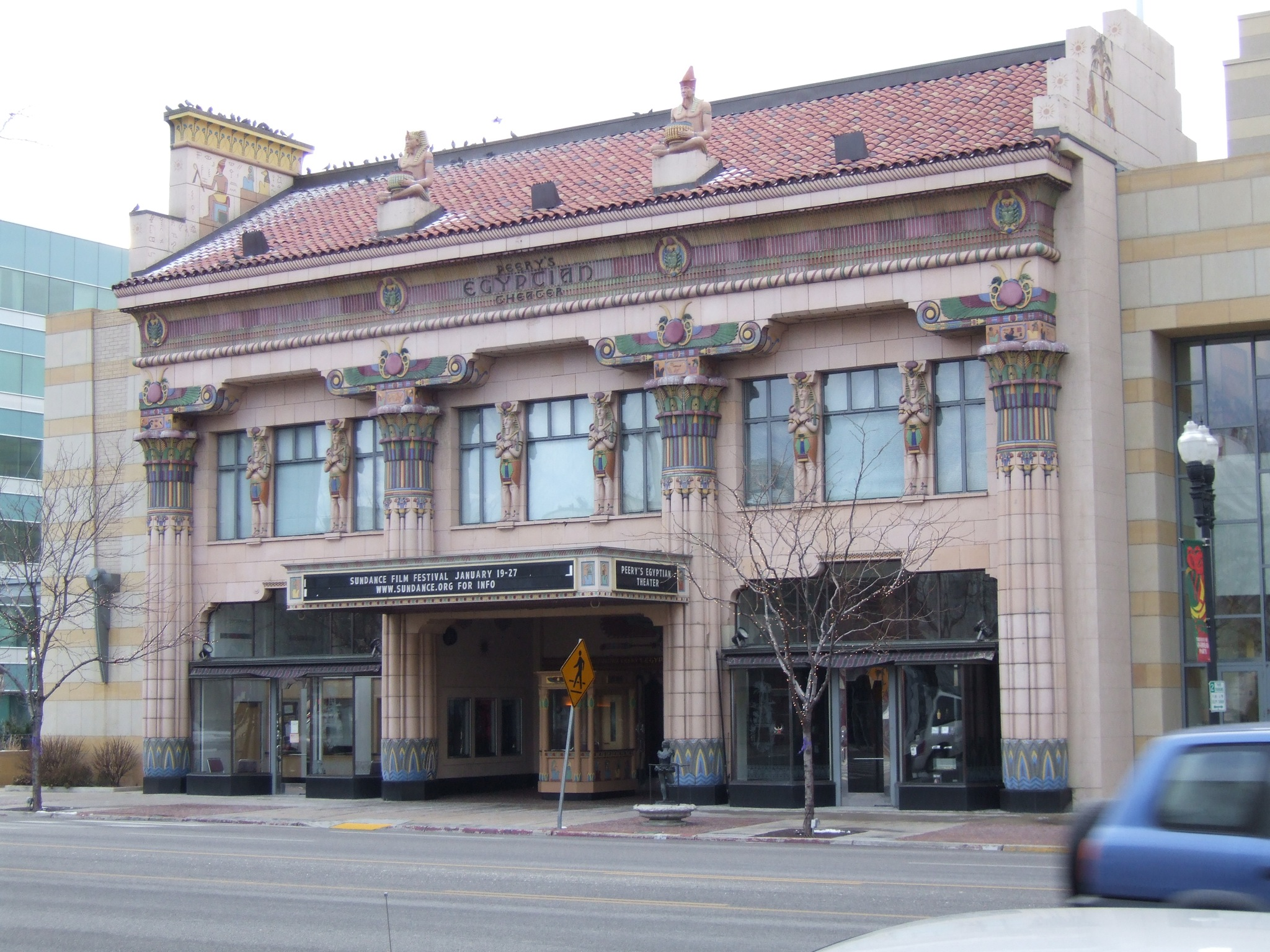
Peery's Egyptian Theatre, Downtown

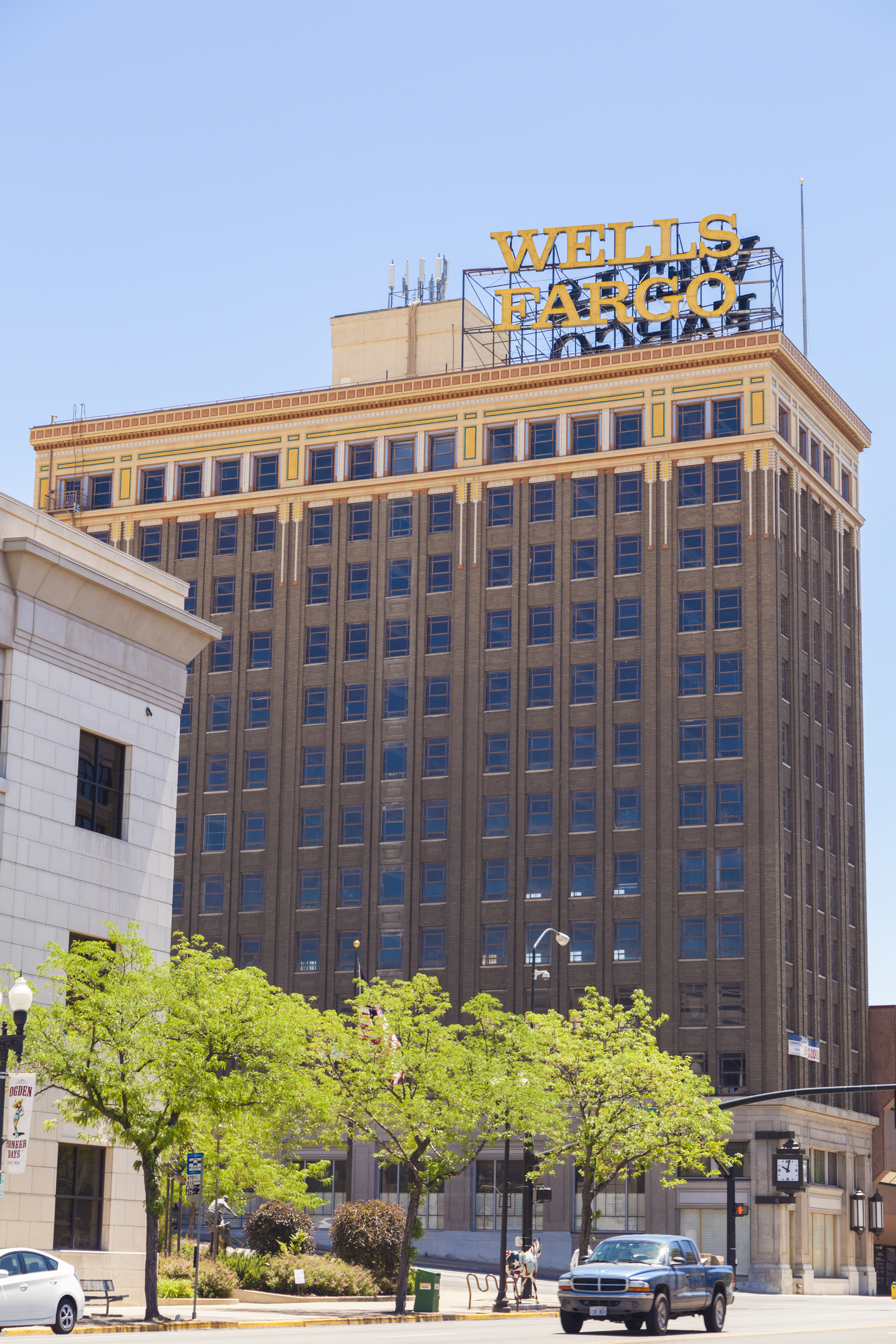
The First Security Building on 24th Street

- Bigelow-Ben Lomond Hotel
- Dee Events Center
- Eccles Avenue Historic District
- Historic 25th Street
- The Ice Sheet Curling: venue used during the 2002 Winter Olympics
- Jefferson Avenue Historic District
- The Junction: retail and residential complex
- Ogden High School
- Ogden Nature Center
- Ogden Utah Temple
- American Can Company of Utah Building Complex
- Ott Planetarium
- Peery's Egyptian Theatre
- Snowbasin Ski Area: alpine skiing venue used during the 2002 Winter Olympics
- Union Station
- Ogden Forest Service Building
- Weber State University

== Sports and recreation ==
The mountains and rivers near Ogden offer many opportunities for outdoor recreation.

An extensive trail system, immediately adjacent to the city's eastern edge, gives residents and visitors immediate access to the foothills of the Wasatch Range. The foothill trails are used for hiking, running, mountain biking, and sometimes snowshoeing and cross-country skiing. Steeper trails climb eastward into the mountains, and many other mountain trails originate within a few miles of the city. A system of paved urban trails runs along the banks of the Ogden and Weber Rivers.

The quartzite cliffs above Ogden's foothills provide a variety of rock climbing routes. An extensive boulder field in the foothills is one of the most popular bouldering sites in the state.

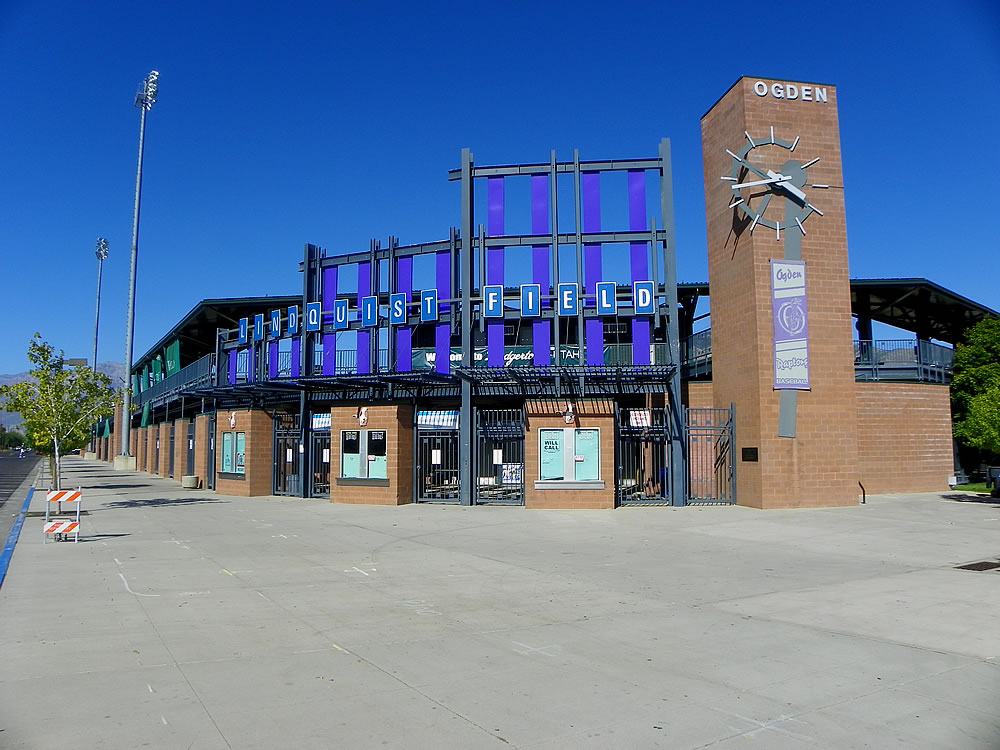
Lindquist Field, home of the Raptors

On the mountains east of Ogden are three downhill ski areas: Snowbasin, Powder Mountain, and Nordic Valley. Popular sites for cross-country skiing include Snowbasin and Weber County's North Fork Park.

Kayaking is a popular sport on portions of the Ogden and Weber Rivers. A developed kayak park lies on the Weber River in the western portion of the city. The reservoirs near Ogden are used for a wide variety of water sports.

Ogden is also home to the minor league baseball team Ogden Raptors of the Pioneer League, the Women's Flat Track Derby Association league Junction City Roller Dolls, and the junior hockey team Ogden Mustangs of the United States Premier Hockey League.

Ogden Stadium houses the annual "Hot Rocking 4th", a motorsports event.

There are several golf courses in the city of Ogden.

Weber State University fields several intercollegiate athletic teams that attract spectators from among residents. The university is especially known for its basketball team.

Ogden is a satellite venue of the Sundance Film Festival. A local film festival, now called the Foursite Film Festival, has been held annually since 2004. Other events of interest include a downtown farmer's market, the Ogden Arts Festival, the Harvest Moon Festival, Ogden Winterfest, and the Ogden Marathon.

Ogden has had two shopping malls. Newgate Mall was built in 1981, and Ogden City Mall a year prior. The latter was torn down and redeveloped as The Junction complex.

Panoramic video clip of Ogden recorded on the Bonneville Shoreline Trail at 5,111 ft (1,558 m) Clip pans from south to west to north

== In the media ==
Ogden is one of five cities featured in the first season of the ABC reality series Emergency Call, which chronicles real-life 9-1-1 calls and the operator-dispatchers who handle them.

The music video of the pop music hit "I Think We're Alone Now" by Tiffany featured the Ogden City Mall, which has since been replaced by The Junction complex.

== Notable people ==
- Hal Ashby, film director
- Rodney Bagley, engineer
- Tanoka Beard, basketball player
- Colby Bockwoldt, football player
- Solon Borglum, sculptor
- Fawn M. Brodie, historian
- John Moses Browning, inventor and firearms designer
- Val A. Browning, industrialist, philanthropist, and gun innovator
- Laurence J. Burton, politician
- Nolan Bushnell, businessman
- R. D. Call, actor
- Tom Chambers, basketball player
- Les Clark, film animator and director
- Elwood Cooke, tennis player
- John Curtis, politician
- Bernard DeVoto, historian
- Kelly Downs, baseball player
- Spencer Eccles, philanthropist
- Arthur Guy Empey, adventurer, soldier, writer, actor
- Arnie Ferrin, basketball player
- Byron Foulger, actor
- Tracy Hall, chemist
- William Jefferson Hardin, politician
- Robert Harris, politician
- Alexander Healy, rancher
- Patrick Healy, railroad engineer, sheepman, banker, hotelier
- William Wadsworth Hodkinson, film industry
- Francis L. Horspool, painter
- Ashley Jenkins, online personality
- Cecil Jensen, editorial cartoonist
- Edward U. Knowlton, physician and politician
- Jeff Lowe, alpinist
- May Mann, newspaper and magazine columnist
- J. Willard Marriott, hotel magnate
- Herbert B. Maw, politician
- K. Gunn McKay, politician
- Joe McQueen, jazz saxophonist
- Wataru Misaka, basketball player
- Blake Moore (born 1980), politician
- Red Nichols, jazz musician, bandleader
- Ray Noorda, business executive
- The Osmonds, family of singers and entertainers: George Jr. (Virl), Tom, Alan, Wayne, Merrill, Jay, Donny, Marie, Jimmy
- Janice Kapp Perry, songwriter
- Byron Scott, basketball player and coach
- Brent Scowcroft, politician
- Sarah Sellers, long-distance runner
- Richard H. Stallings, politician
- Ken St. Andre, game designer
- Brent R. Taylor, politician and United States Army officer
- Minerva Teichert, artist
- E. Parry Thomas, banker
- Olene S. Walker, politician,
- Ginger Wallace, artist and philanthropist
- Gedde Watanabe, actor

== See also ==
- Amalgamated Sugar Company
- Conoco
- Defense Depot Ogden
- Hi-Fi murders
- International Armoring Corporation
- McKay-Dee Hospital Center
- Standard-Examiner
- Victim: The Other Side of Murder
