= Springville Museum of Art =

- Springville High School Art Gallery
- U.S. National Register of Historic Places
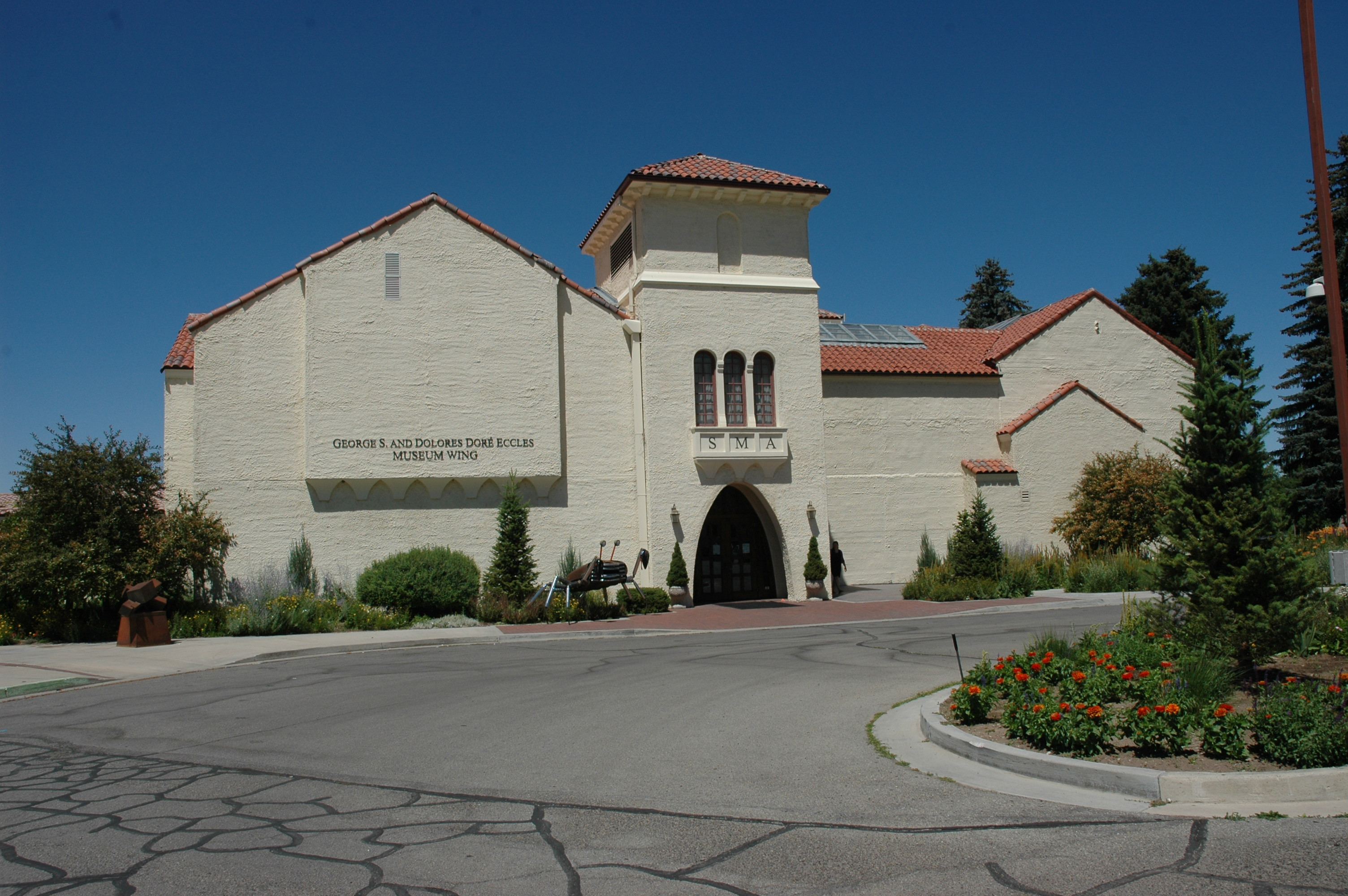
- Entrance to the art museum, June 2012

- Location within Utah Location within the United States
- Location: 126 East 400 South; Springville, Utah; United States
- Coordinates: 40°9′39″N 111°36′28″W
- Area: 1 acre (0.40 ha)
- Built: 1936-37; 1964
- Built by: WPA
- Architects: Ashworth, Claude S.
- Architectural style: Mission/Spanish Revival
- MPS: Public Works Buildings TR
- NRHP reference No.: 86000750
- Added to NRHP: April 9, 1986

The Springville Museum of Art in Springville, Utah, United States is the oldest museum for the visual fine arts in Utah. In 1986, the building was listed on the National Register of Historic Places. As of 2022, the museum's director is Emily Larsen.

== Description ==
Completed in 1937, this building was designed in the Spanish Colonial Revival style by architect Claud S. Ashworth (1885–1971). It was dedicated by LDS Apostle David O. McKay as "A sanctuary of beauty and a temple of meditation." The museum "seeks to fulfill its mission by refining minds and building character through the fine arts." It was listed on the National Register of Historic Places in 1986 as Springville High School Art Gallery.

It was built during 1936–37 and was extended in 1964. The Springville Museum of Art was made possible by the Nebo School District, the Works Progress Administration Act, and the Church of Jesus Christ of Latter-day Saints. In 1964 a two-story wing was added as a gift from the Clyde Foundation.

== History ==
The Springville art movement began in 1903 with a donation of art by John Hafen and Cyrus Dallin. It was followed in 1907 by a donation from seven other Utah artists. The Smart collection came in 1925, followed by the Steed Collection (1948), and the Lund-Wassmer Collection in 1986. The Art Association Board of Trustees and the City of Springville continue to contribute to the growth of both the museum and its art.

The museum is noted for its collection of Utah art spanning from pioneer days to the present. Most of the major artists and styles of Utah are represented in nine permanent galleries in the museum. All 275 of the pieces are arranged in chronological order and show the development of art in Utah. The works of 250 artists are featured, including those of Doug Snow, Lee U. Bennion, Mahonri Young, Dan Weggeland, Francis L. Horspool, and LeConte Stewart. The museum celebrated the 80th anniversary of the Springville Art Museum in 2017.

=== Museum timeline ===
- 1901: An art committee is commissioned to promote art in Springville schools.
- 1903: John Hafen and Cyrus E. Dallin make a gift to begin a collection of sculpture and paintings.
- 1907: Faculty and students at Springville High begin setting aside funds for the purchases of works of art at their school.
- 1921: The very first Spring Salon art Exhibition is held.
- 1925: The Springville High Art Association is formed for the protection, collection and presentation of fine art. 65 works of Utah art are donated by Emma and George Smart.
- 1929: Polish-American artist Stan Poray, recently from the Imperial Court in Kyoto, has a major solo exhibition.
- 1937: The Hafen-Dallin club is formed to promote the fine arts. The Springville Art Museum building is completed as a WPA (Works Progress Administration) project.
- 1948: Alice and Merlin Steed donate 133 works of art.
- 1964: The families of Hyrum Smith and Elanora Johnson Clyde donate funds for the construction of a new west wing in which two new galleries are housed.
- 1975: The museum building is transferred from the Nebo School District to the city of Springville.
- 1986: 300 works of art are donated by Theodore Wassmer and Judy Lund-Wassmer.
- 1986: Building was listed on the National Register of Historic Places.
- 1993: The City of Springville gives permission to the Springville Museum of Art Board to raise funds to build a new wing.
- 1998: Construction begins on a 20,000 square foot (1,900 m²) addition to the museum which emphasizes education for children and provides extra gallery space for the museum's permanent art collection.
- 2012: Rita Wright becomes the new director of the Springville Museum of Art.

== Permanent collection ==
Selections of the museum's collection of 2,300 works are displayed on the second floor. They consist of art from Utah, the former Soviet Union and the United States.

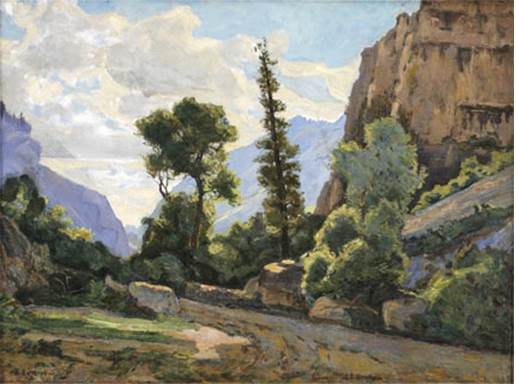
Edwin Evans, American Fork Canyon (1900)

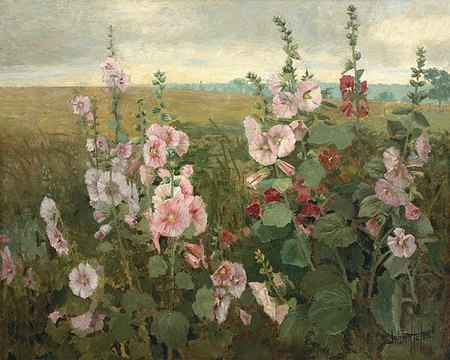
John Hafen, Hollyhocks (c.1900)

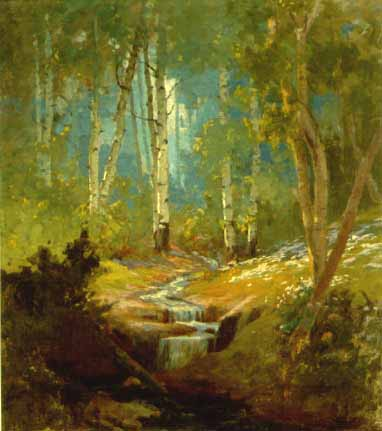
John Hafen, Mountain Stream (1903)

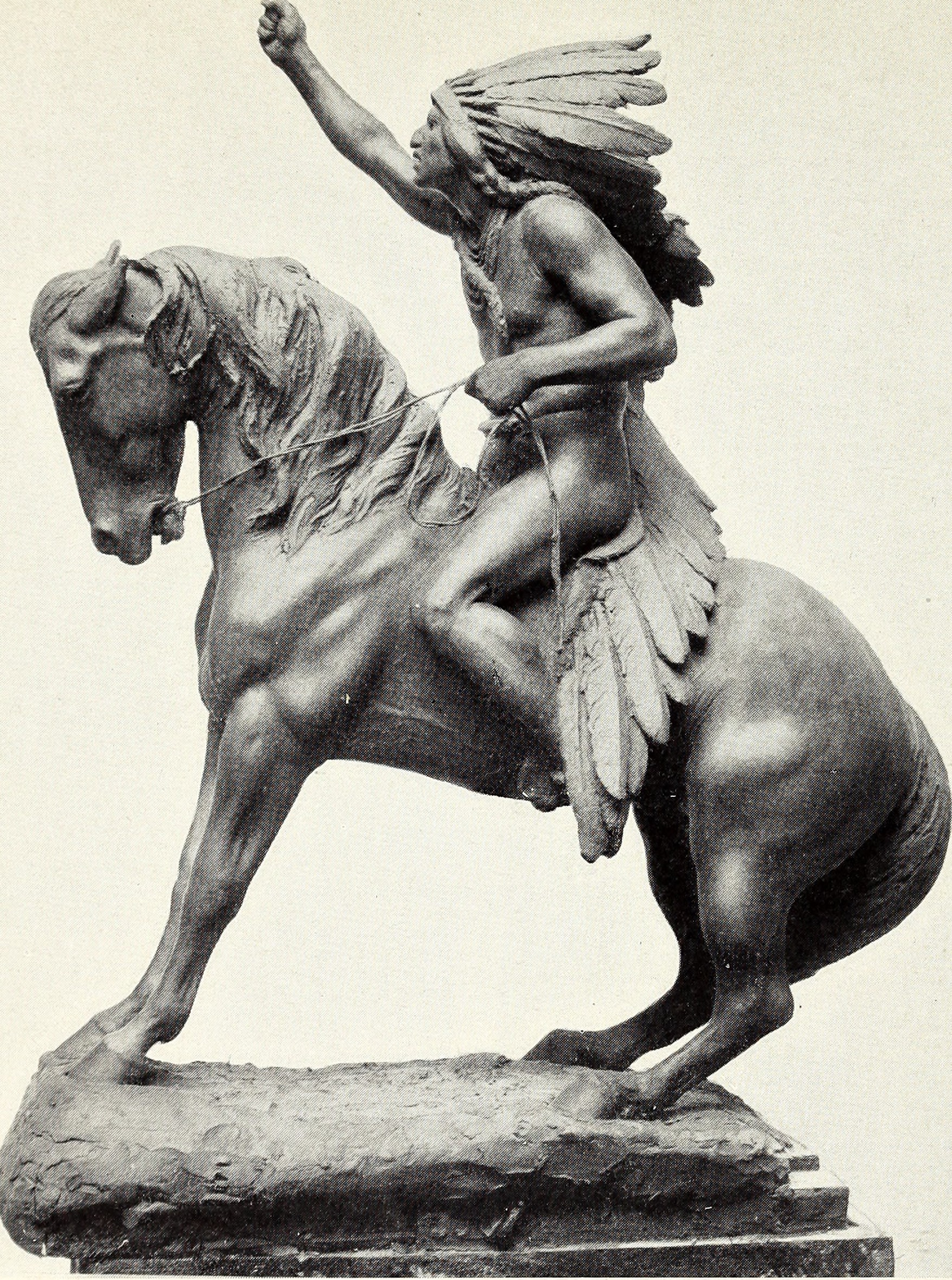
Cyrus Dallin, The Protest (1904)

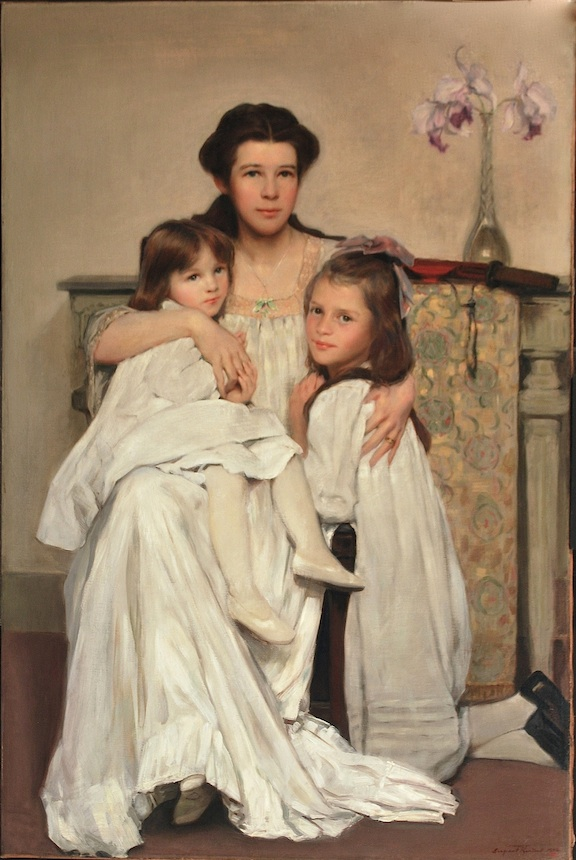
William Sergeant Kendall, The Artist’s Wife and Daughters (1906)

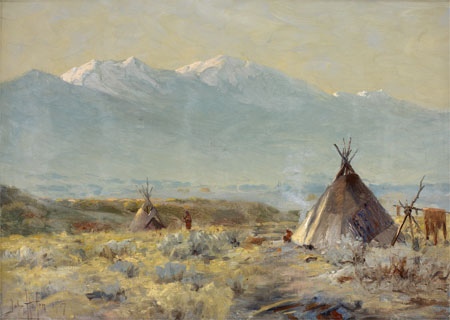
John Hafen, Tepees, Utah County (1907)

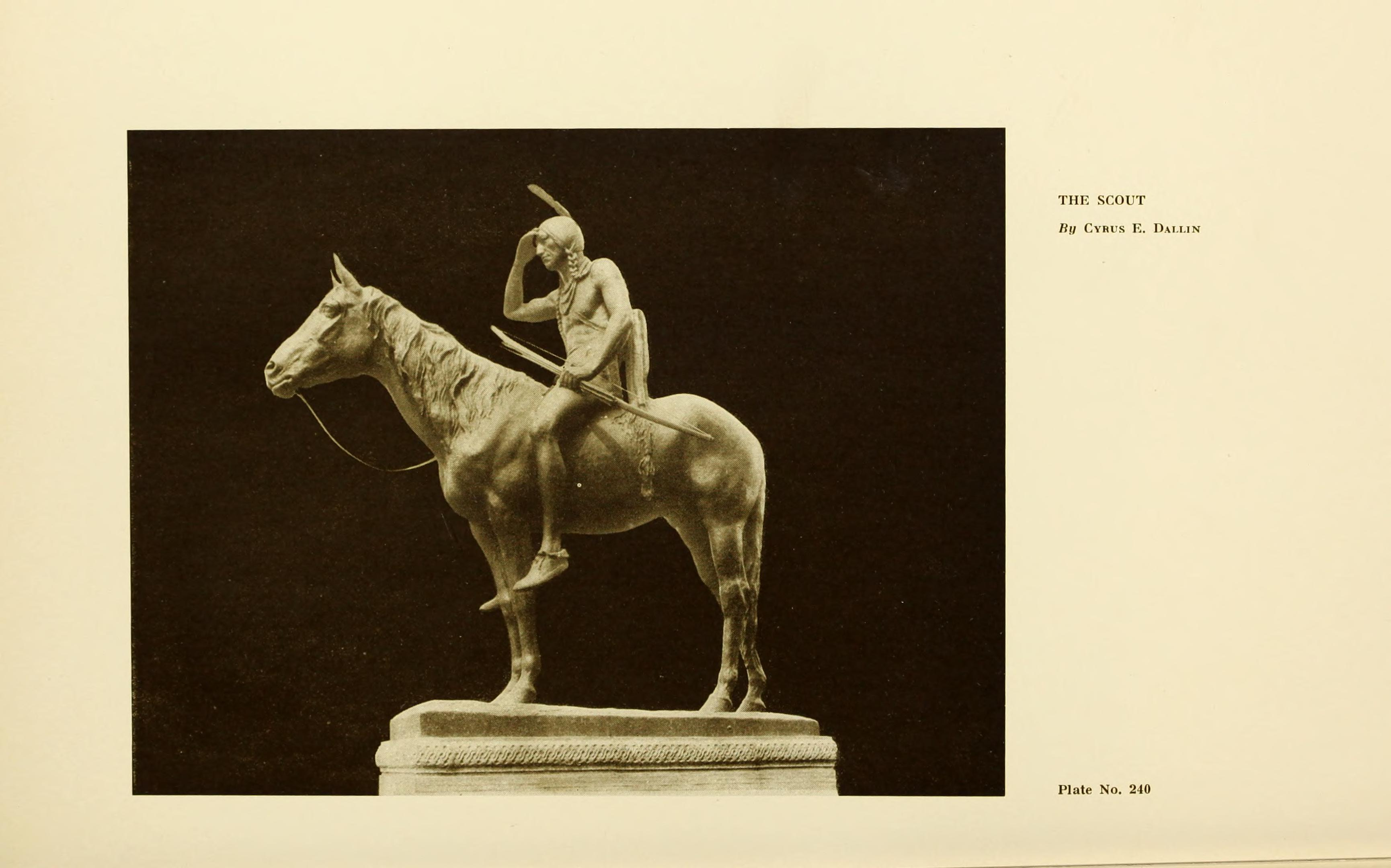
Cyrus Dallin, The Scout (1910)

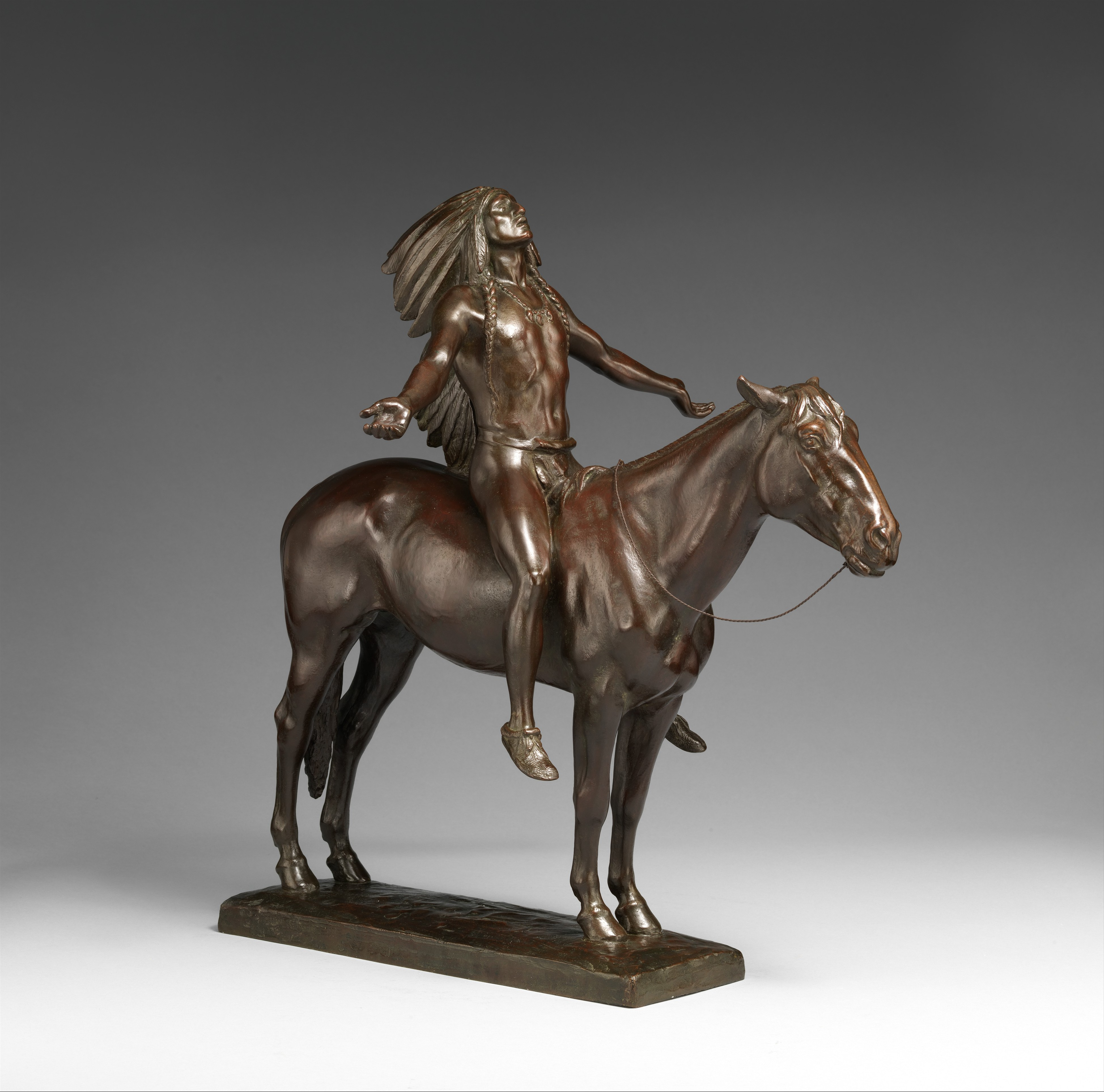
Cyrus Dallin, Appeal to the Great Spirit (1912)

== Temporary exhibitions ==
The seven main galleries on the first-floor display temporary shows and consist of a wide variety of styles dealing with both historical and contemporary issues. Some of the most popular exhibitions include the annual exhibitions: the All-State Utah High School Art Show, the Quilt Show, the Spiritual and Religious Show, and the Spring Salon.

== See also ==
- National Register of Historic Places listings in Utah County, Utah
- List of museums in Utah
- List of Utah artists
- Mormon art
