= Lindquist Field =

Baseball park in the western United States

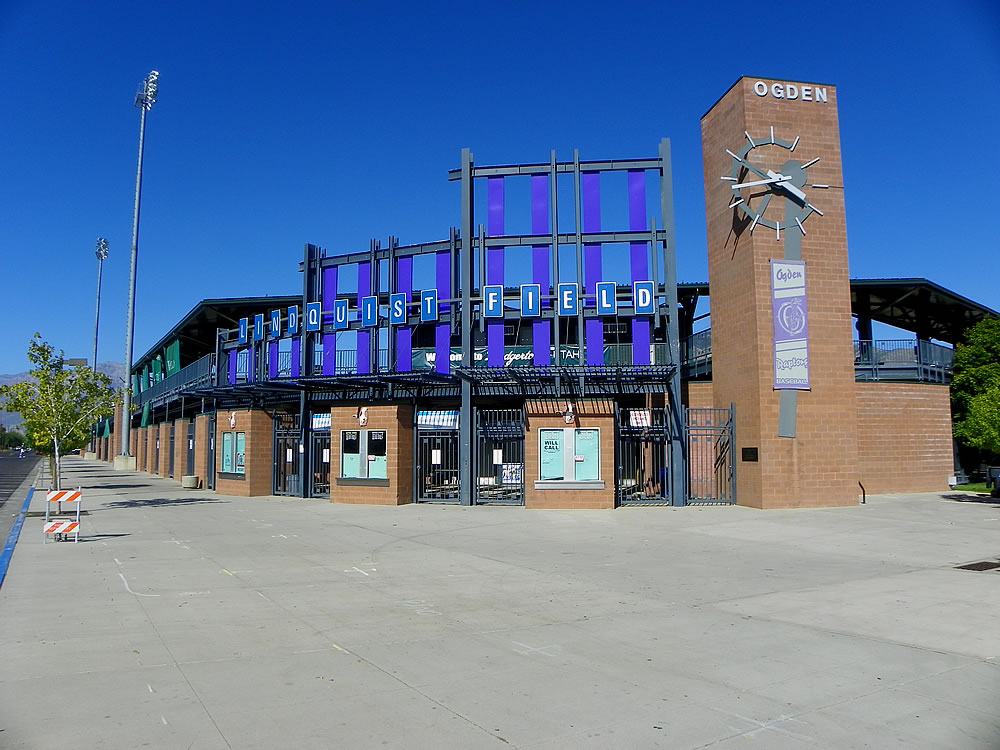
- Lindquist Field, September 2009

- Location in the United States Location in Utah
- Interactive map of Lindquist Field
- Address: 2330 Lincoln Avenue
- Location: Ogden, Utah; United States
- Coordinates: 41.224°N 111.975°W
- Elevation: 4,300 ft (1,310 m)
- Owner: City of Ogden
- Operator: City of Ogden
- Capacity: 8,700
- Surface: Natural grass

Construction
- Groundbreaking: 1995
- Opened: June 24, 1997; 29 years ago
- Cost: $5 million ($10 million in 2025 dollars)

Tenant
- Ogden Raptors (PL) 1997–present

Lindquist Field is a baseball park in the western United States, located in Ogden, Utah. It has a capacity for 8,700 fans and it is the home field of the Ogden Raptors, an independent minor league team in the Pioneer League.

== Description ==
The ballpark debuted 29 years ago in 1997 and has led the Pioneer League in attendance every year since it opened. It is named after former Raptors co-owner Ethan J. Lindquist.

In 2008, the Raptors added a new spectator deck large enough for 1,200 spectators, two more concession stands, a Hardball Café, and an additional 2,000 fixed seats to the stadium. A new masonry wall was added, and the chain-link fencing was also replaced.

The natural grass field is aligned northeast (home plate to second base) at an approximate elevation of 4,300 feet (1,310 m) above sea level; at the foot of the Wasatch Range, it opens up to a view of the mountains. Both BaseballParks.com and DigitalBallParks.com have awarded Lindquist Field "Best View" in all of baseball.
