= Bigelow-Ben Lomond Hotel =

- Bigelow–Ben Lomond Hotel
- U.S. National Register of Historic Places
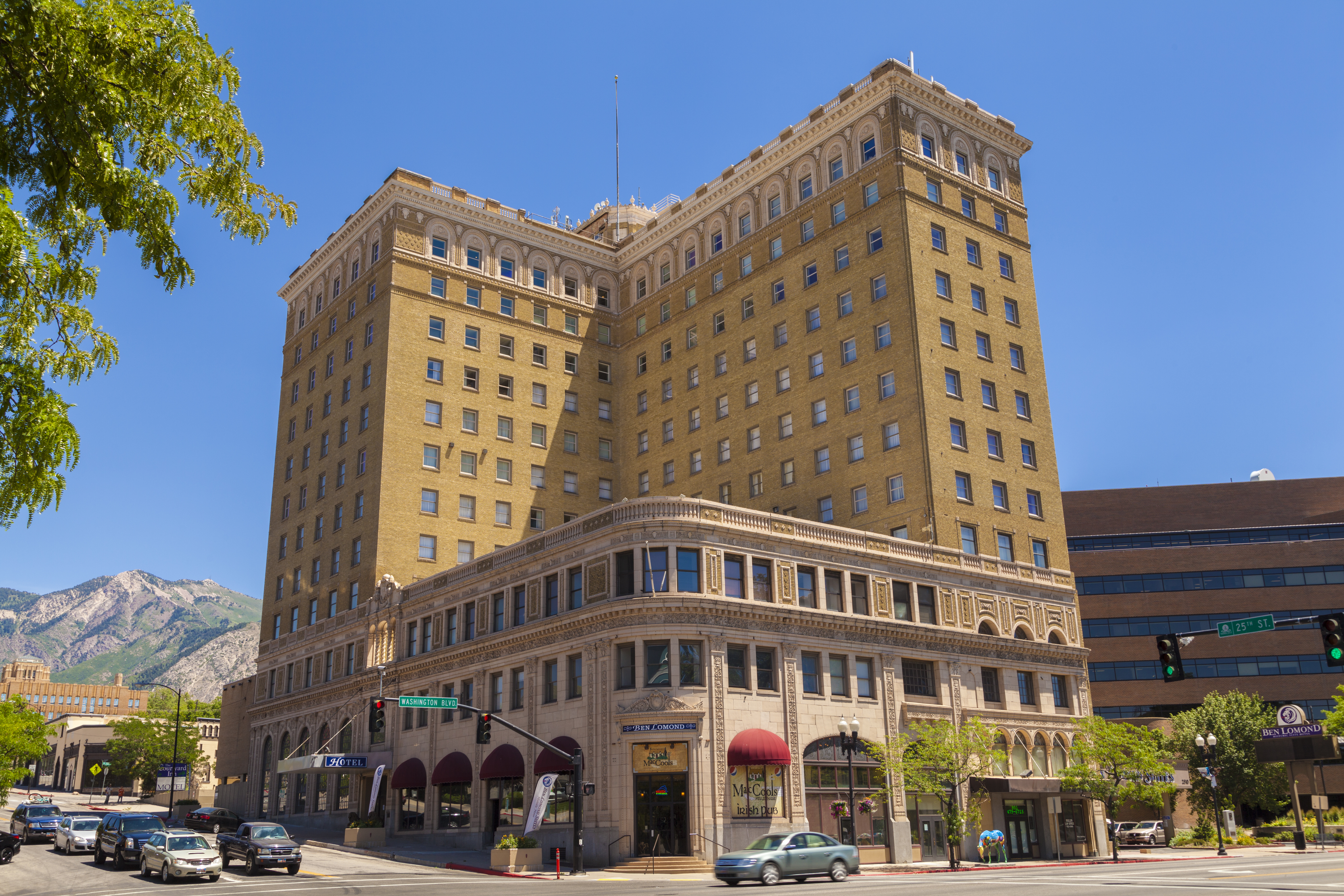
- Ben Lomond Suites Historic Hotel

- Location within Utah Location within the United States
- Location: 2510 Washington Blvd., Ogden, Utah
- Coordinates: 41°13′14″N 111°58′10″W
- Area: 1.6 acres (0.65 ha)
- Built: 1927
- Architect: Hodgson & McClenahan; Whitmeyer, George & Sons
- Architectural style: Late 19th And 20th Century Revivals, Italian Renaissance
- NRHP reference No.: 90000637
- Added to NRHP: April 19, 1990

The Bigelow Hotel is a historic hotel located at 2510 Washington Blvd. in Ogden, Utah, United States. Opened in 1927, it was known from 1933-2017 as the Ben Lomond Hotel. It was added to the National Register of Historic Places in 1990. It is notable for its Italian Renaissance Revival architectural significance and as the setting of historical events. The hotel was a member of Choice Hotels' Ascend Collection. In 2019 it was converted to The Bigelow Apartments.

== History ==
The Bigelow Hotel opened in 1927. It has remained the largest hotel in the city of Ogden since the time of its construction. It is considered one of three "grand hotels" in Utah. The other two hotels are the former Hotel Utah and the now-demolished Newhouse Hotel.

On the site of the Bigelow previously stood another hotel, the five-story Reed Hotel (1891). A. Peery, a local businessman, decided to build a modern hotel in its place. A corporation with 300 shareholders was organized for the funding and management of the project. The hotel was originally named for local banker Archie P. Bigelow.

The architectural firm of Hodgson & McClenahan, notable for other fine works in Ogden, was hired to draw plans for the hotel. Other projects done by this firm include Peery's Egyptian Theatre, Ogden High School, Ogden/Weber Municipal Building, the Regional Forest Service Building, Stock Exchange Building and several Prairie School residences in the Eccles Avenue Historic District. The construction cost for the building has been stated at $1,250,000 in 1927.

It is a fine example of the Italian Renaissance Revival style, common in the 1920s, but unusual for Utah. The building stands as a prime example of the growth and economic development in Ogden during that decade. The exterior was finished in a terra cotta style, highly ornamented, especially on the sides that face 25th Street and Washington Boulevard.

Inside, themes ranged from an Arabic-style coffee shop to a Florentine Palace ballroom. A meeting room for businessmen's clubs offered a touch of old Spain, while the English Room used old wood paneling influenced by a room in Bromley Palace, England. The Georgian Room was decorated in Adamesque style, but the Shakespeare Room, with murals painted by local artist LeConte Stewart, was the jewel of the Hotel.

The Hotel gained national attention when, in 1928, it played host to the Western Democrats convention. The Western States "Smith for President" campaign signaled to Democratic leaders that Alfred E. Smith would be a force in the presidential election of 1928. This event was covered in the October 3, 1927 issue of Time.

Marriner S. Eccles acquired the Bigelow Hotel in 1933 and renamed it the Ben Lomond Hotel. It remained a functional hotel for more than 40 years. Several owners, including Weber County, have used it for different purposes, including offices. Radisson purchased the hotel in the 1980s and refurbished it. The hotel returned to its original name, after more than 80 years, in 2017. In 2019, the hotel was converted into an apartment complex, making it the last of Utah's trio of "grand hotels" to cease its original function.
