= Eccles Avenue Historic District =

Historic house in Utah, United States

- U.S. National Register of Historic Places
- U.S. Historic district
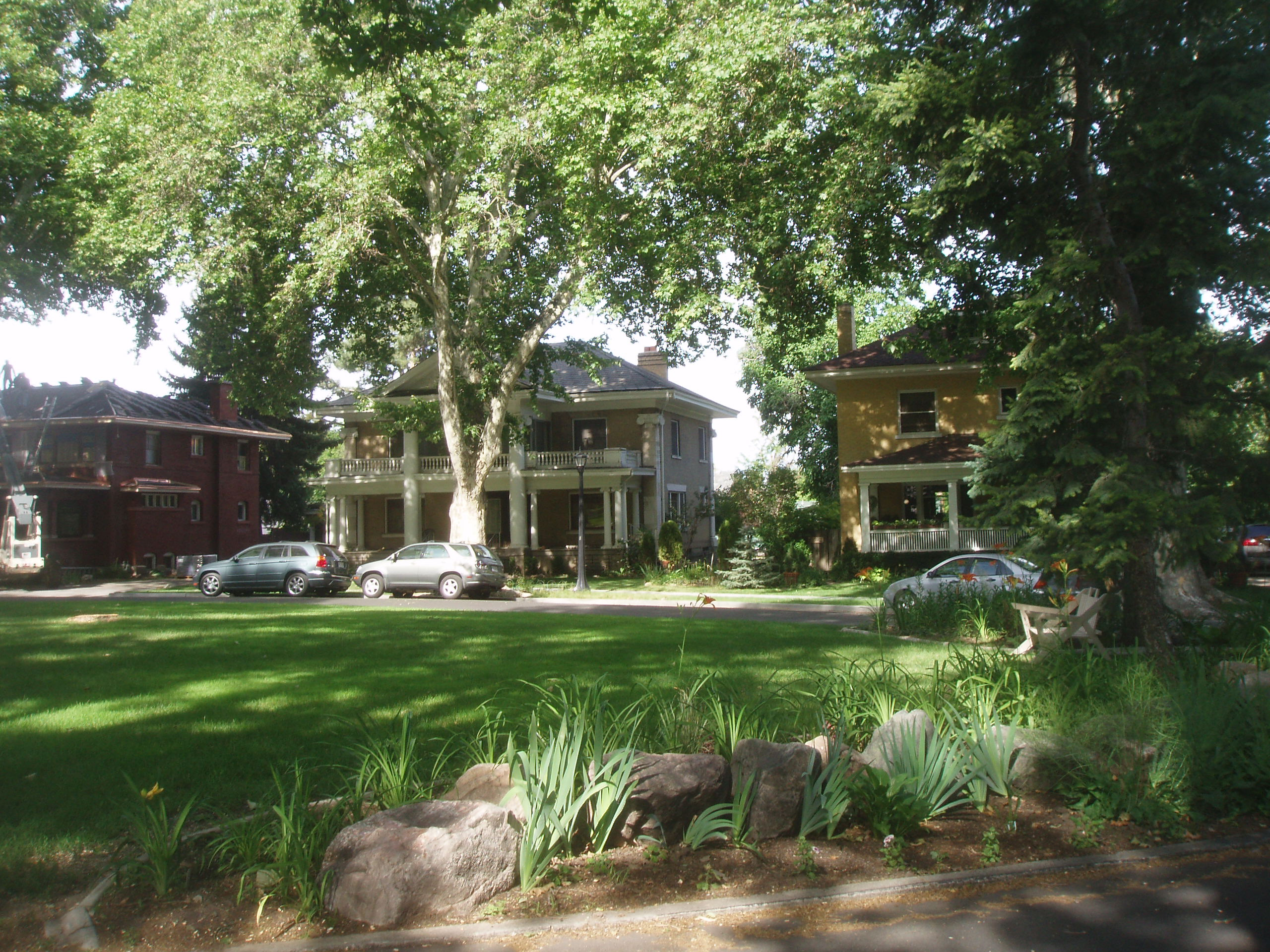
- West side of the district, June 2009

- Location within Utah Location within the United States
- Location: Bounded by 25th and 26th Sts., Van Buren and Jackson Aves., Ogden, Utah
- Coordinates: 41°13′10″N 111°57′5″W
- Area: 0 acres (0 ha)
- Architect: Hodgson, Leslie S.; Piers, Eber F.
- Architectural style: Prairie School
- NRHP reference No.: 76001840
- Added to NRHP: December 12, 1976

Eccles Avenue Historic District, also known as the David Eccles Subdivision, is a historic neighborhood located between 25th and 26th streets and Jackson and Van Buren Avenues in Ogden, Utah, United States. It was listed on the National Register of Historic Places in 1976.

== History ==
Most of the architecturally significant homes were built between 1910 and 1930 with the majority of the larger homes built during the initial settlement decade. Original inhabitants included families Browning (first generation descendants of gun inventor John Browning and Matthew S. Browning), Eccles (first generation descendants of 19th century multi-millionaire David Eccles), E.O. Wattis (of the Utah Construction Company), Patterson, Dumke, Healy, Rowe, Larkin among other Utah (and national) notables. On Van Buren Avenue to the north but not included in the district are also the substantial Ralph Bristol House and the Gustav Becker House. Several families in the district also had patriarchal ties (Eccles, Patterson, Healy, Wattis, and Bigelow) in the Jefferson Avenue Historic District to the west.

The district was also later home to notables such as Marriner S. Eccles, a Chairman of the Federal Reserve and co-founder of First Security Bank (Marriner Browning, an original inhabitant of the district was also a founder.)

The architects of these buildings are listed as Hodgson, Leslie S. and Piers, Eber F. Hodgson was part of a later firm, Hodgson & McClenahan, that developed the famous Ogden Art Deco buildings, including Ogden High School, the U.S. Forest Service Building and Ogden/Weber Municipal Building. Other noteworthy projects included the Union Stock Yard Exchange Building, Shupe-Williams Candy Company Factory, Scowcroft Warehouse, Peery's Egyptian Theatre, Peery Apartments, Patterson Building, and Eccles Building.

Most of the substantial buildings in the Eccles Avenue Historic District were based on the Prairie School architectural style, but several variations of period styles exist including craftsman, bungalow and Tudor. A few of the buildings are currently commercially utilized but the majority are privately owned residential dwellings.

== See also ==
- National Register of Historic Places listings in Weber County, Utah
