= Peery Apartments =

- U.S. National Register of Historic Places
- U.S. Historic district – Contributing property
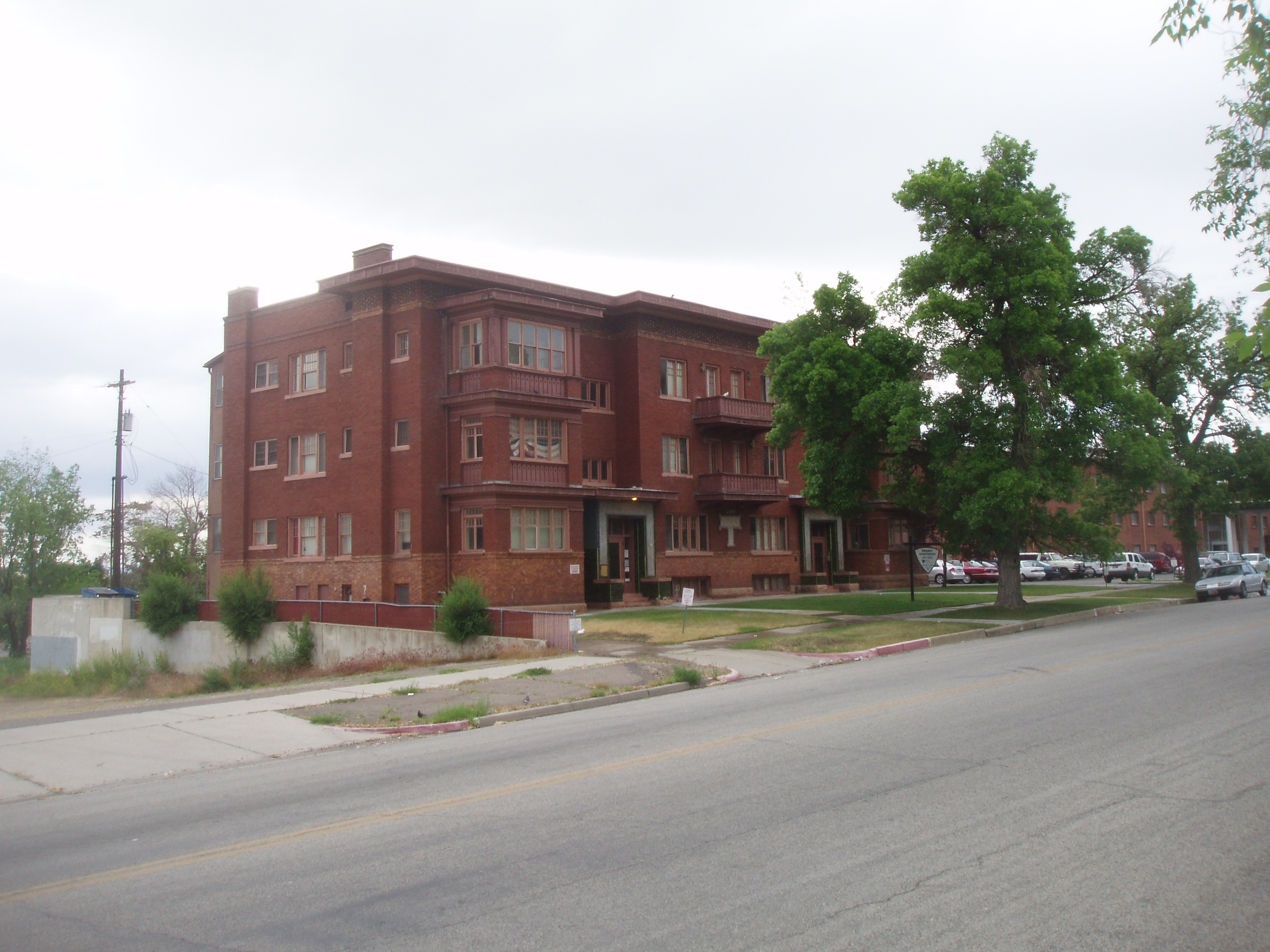
- The building in May 2009

- Location within Utah Location within the United States
- Location: 2461 Adams Avenue; Ogden, Utah; United States
- Coordinates: 41°13′16″N 111°58′03″W
- Area: less than one acre
- Built: 1909
- Architect: Julius A. Smith; Leslie Simmons Hodgson
- Architectural style: Prairie School
- Part of: Ogden Central Bench Historic District (ID03000055)
- MPS: Three-Story Apartment Buildings in Ogden, 1908--1928 MPS
- NRHP reference No.: 87002174

Significant dates
- Added to NRHP: December 31, 1987
- Designated CP: July 22, 2005

The Peery Apartments is a historic three-story building within the Ogden Central Bench Historic District in Ogden, Utah, United States, that is individually listed on the National Register of Historic Places (NRHP).

== Description ==
The structure was built in 1909–1910 as an investment for the David H. Peery family, and designed in the Prairie School style by architects Julius A. Smith and Leslie Simmons Hodgson.

It was listed on the NRHP December 31, 1987.

== See also ==
- National Register of Historic Places listings in Weber County, Utah
