= Summit County Courthouse =

Summit County Courthouse may refer to:

- Summit County Courthouse (Ohio), Akron, Ohio
- Summit County Courthouse (Utah), Coalville, Utah
