= Scowcroft Warehouse =

- U.S. National Register of Historic Places
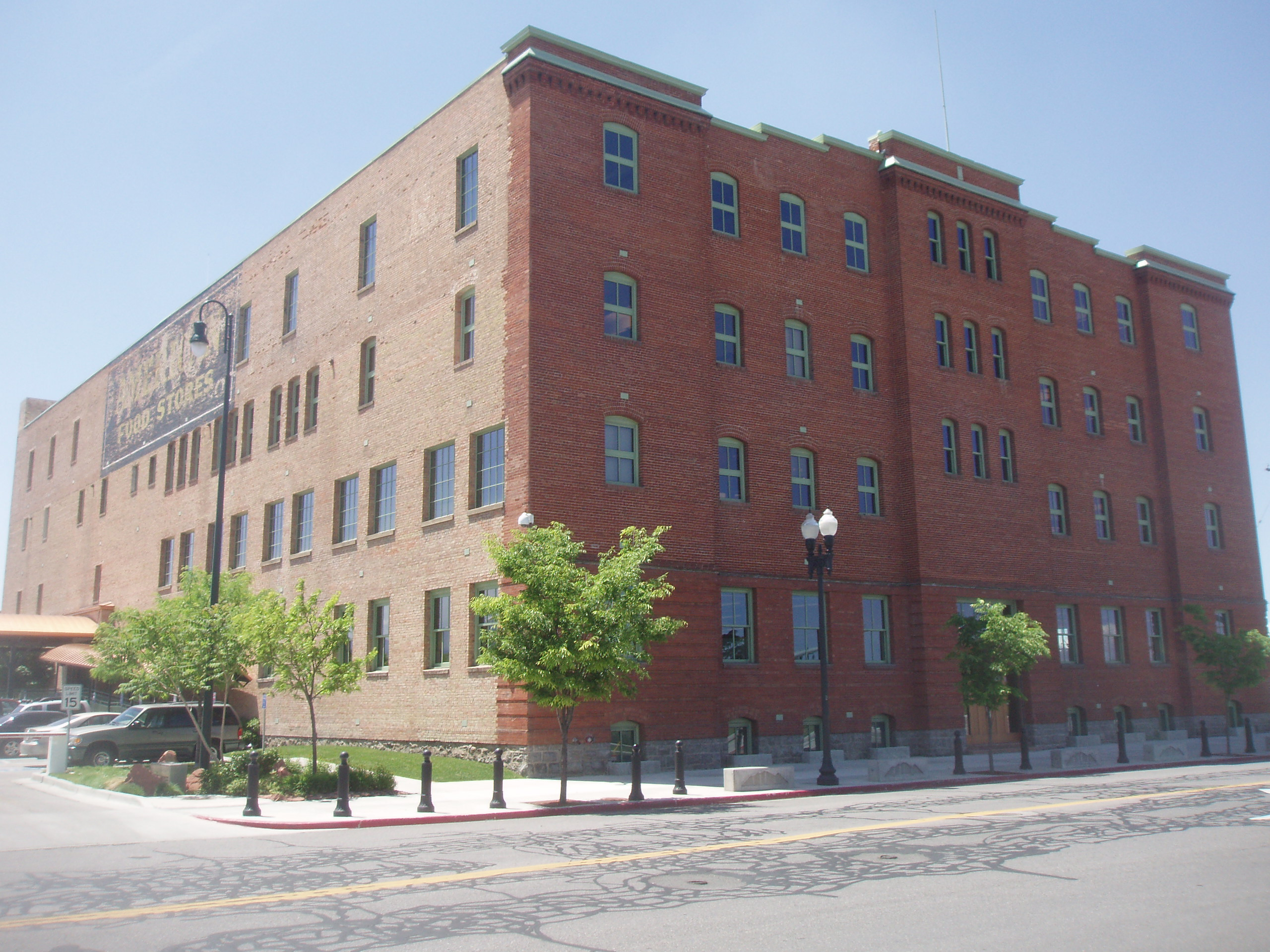
- The warehouse in 2009

- Location within Utah Location within the United States
- Location: 105 23rd Street, Ogden, Utah
- Coordinates: 41°13′29″N 111°58′39″W
- Area: less than one acre
- Built: 1900
- Architect: Leslie S. Hodgson
- NRHP reference No.: 78002715
- Added to NRHP: November 30, 1978

The Scowcroft Warehouse is a historic building in Ogden, Utah. It was built as a four-story warehouse with a basement in 1900 for John Scowcroft and Sons, whose founder John Scowcroft converted to the Church of Jesus Christ of Latter-day Saints in England before immigrating to Utah with his family in 1880. He was the founder and namesake of this dry goods wholesale company in Ogden, and he was also a director of a beetroot sugar manufacturer in Northern Utah called the Ogden Sugar Company, which later merged with several companies to become the Amalgamated Sugar Company. The factory was designed by Ogden architect Leslie S. Hodgson and was listed on the National Register of Historic Places in 1978.

After sitting vacant for many years, the 105,000 sq. ft building was renovated between 2001-2003 for occupation by the Internal Revenue Service. Renovations include earthquake upgrades, improved roof insulation, and HVAC upgrades. The building has been LEED-Silver certified since 2005.

Scowcroft's son, Heber Scowcroft, was the president of John Scowcroft and Sons, and he resided at the Heber Scowcroft House, also listed on the NRHP.
