= Julius A. Smith =

American architect

- Died: February 27, 1935; Merced, California, U.S.
- Cause of death
- Occupation: Architect

Julius A. Smith (died February 27, 1935) was an American architect. He designed buildings listed on the National Register of Historic Places like Hotel Brigham in Brigham City with Francis Charles Woods and Peery Apartments in Ogden with Leslie Simmons Hodgson.
