= Heber Scowcroft House =

- U.S. National Register of Historic Places
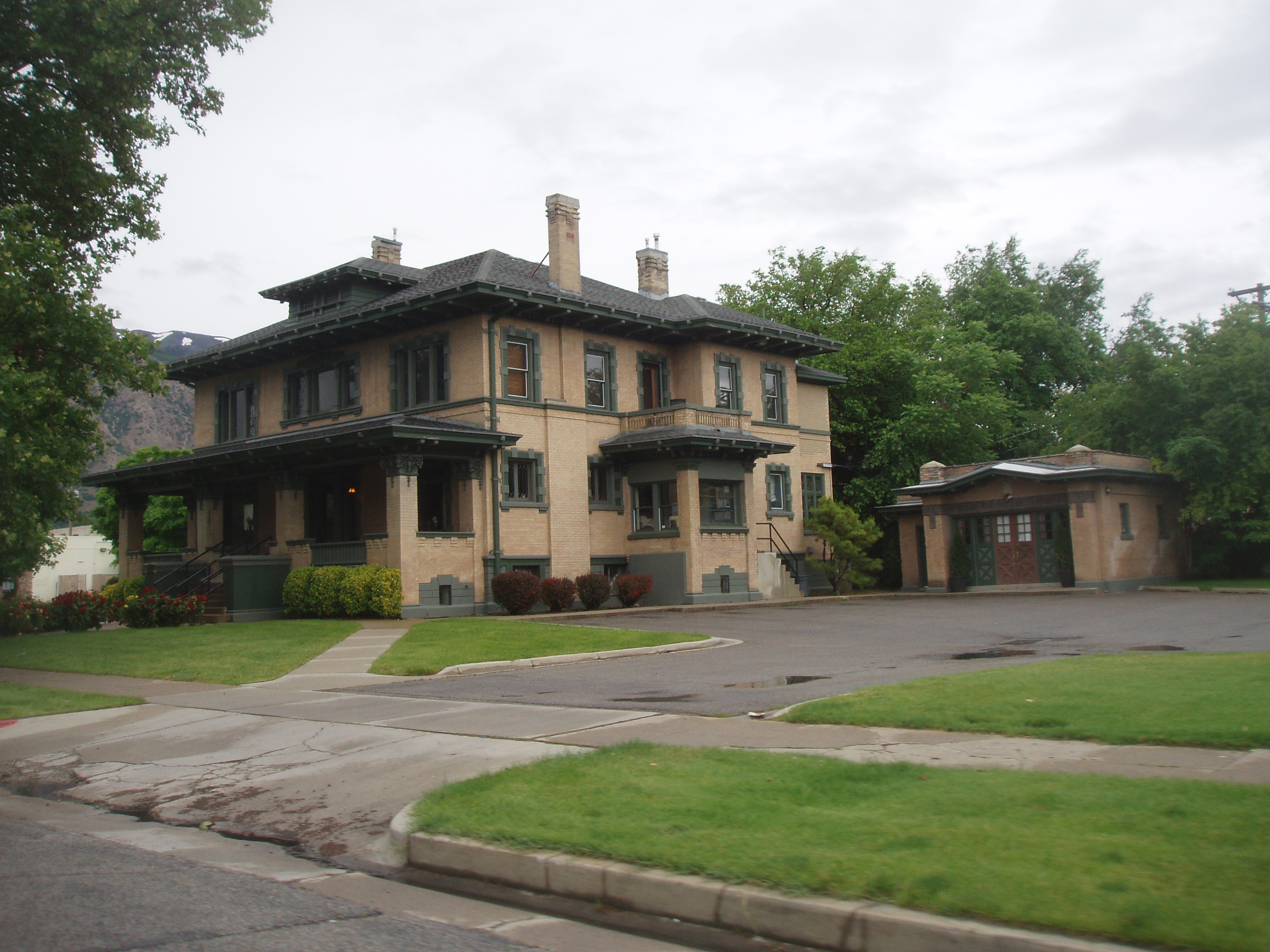
- The house in 2009

- Location within Utah Location within the United States
- Location: 795 24th Street, Ogden, Utah
- Coordinates: 41°13′18″N 111°57′31″W
- Area: 0.3 acres (0.12 ha)
- Built: 1909
- Architect: Moroni Charles Woods
- Architectural style: Colonial Revival
- NRHP reference No.: 91001818
- Added to NRHP: December 13, 1991

The Heber Scowcroft House is a historic two-story house in Ogden, Utah. It was built in 1909 for Heber Scowcroft, an immigrant from England who moved to Utah with his family in 1880 after converting to the Church of Jesus Christ of Latter-day Saints. Scowcroft later worked as the vice president of John Scowcroft and Son, a wholesale dry goods company founded by his father and based in the Scowcroft Warehouse. The house was designed in the Colonial Revival style by architect Moroni Charles Woods. It has been listed on the National Register of Historic Places since December 13, 1991.
