= Jefferson Avenue Historic District (Ogden, Utah) =

Historic district in Utah, United States

- U.S. National Register of Historic Places
- U.S. Historic district
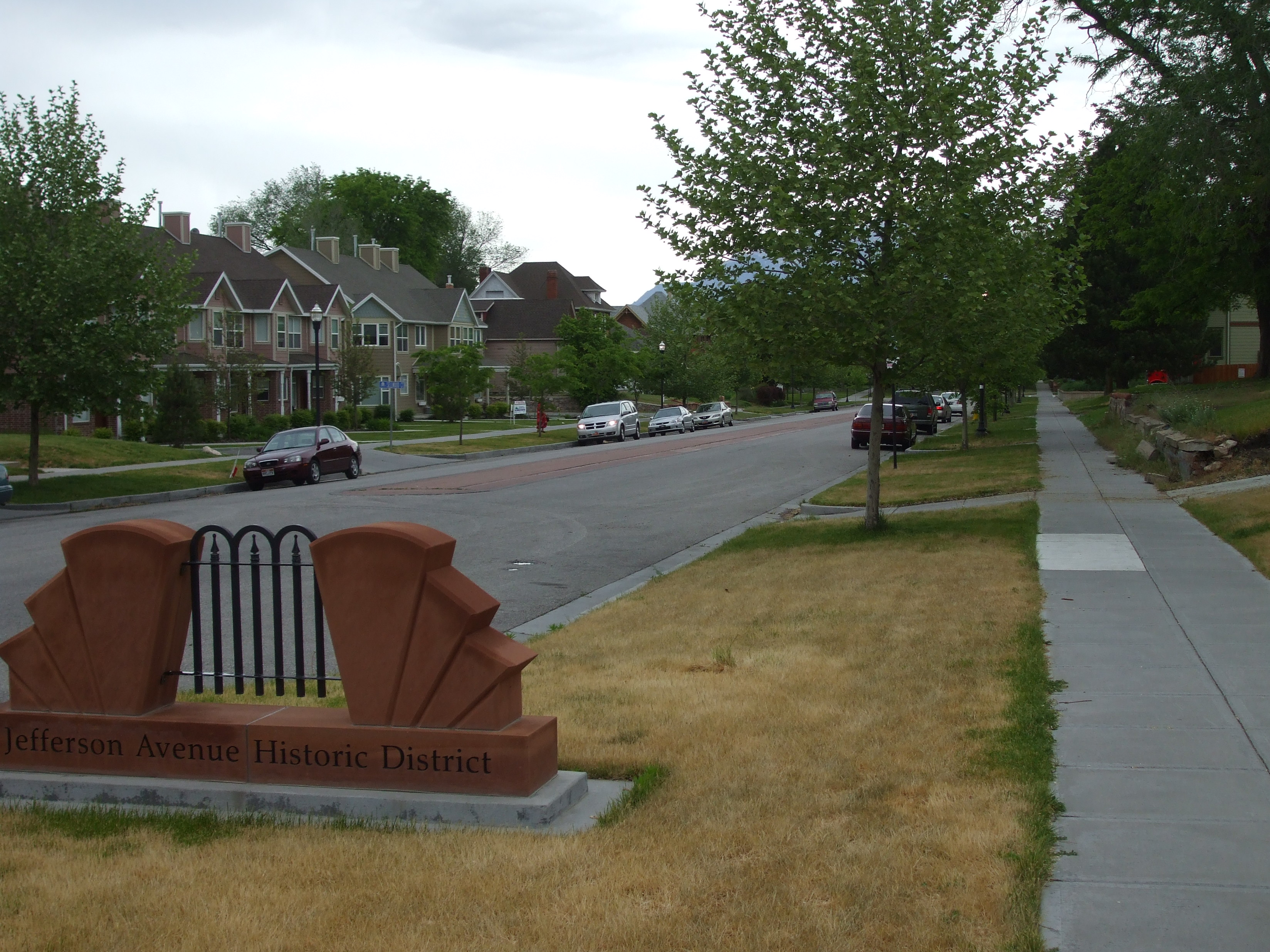
- South Entrance to the district

- Location within Utah Location within the United States
- Location: Roughly along Jefferson Avenue, between 25th and 27th Streets; Ogden, Utah; United States
- Coordinates: 41°13′5″N 111°58′5″W
- Architect: multiple
- Architectural style: Late Victorian, Late 19th And Early 20th Century American Movements
- NRHP reference No.: 98001214
- Added to NRHP: September 25, 1998

The Jefferson Avenue Historic District was formed in 1998 and encompasses all structures between 25th and 27th streets on Jefferson Avenue in Ogden, Utah, United States.

== Description ==
Historically, the Jefferson Avenue area between 25th and 27th Streets was home to many wealthy Ogden residents. Many homes were built in a distinct Victorian style that also permeated the surrounding area. Owners included J.C. Armstrong/David Eccles, Hiram H. Spencer/William Eccles, David C. Eccles, Isadore Marks/Adam Patterson Sr., William H. Wattis, Louis Moench, Thomas Jordan Stevens, William V. Helfrich and Edmund T. Hulaniski.

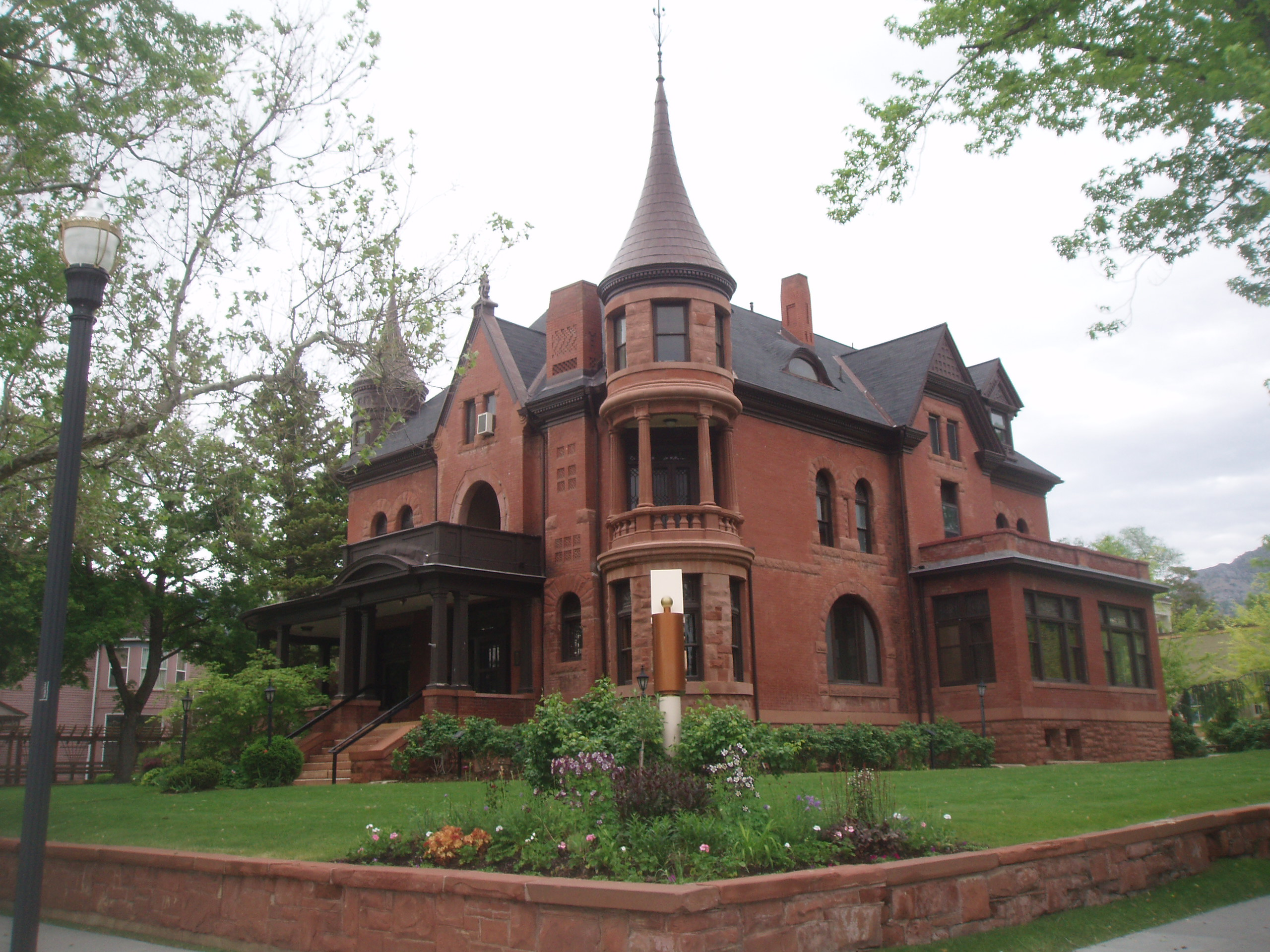
The Bertha Eccles Community Art Center sits in the center of the district.

As the children of the district grew up, many moved to newer homes in the Eccles Avenue Historic District to the east, which used primarily Prairie style architecture over the Victorian style.

Ogden grew significantly from 1910–1950, and the industrial center of the city moved toward the district. This led to its eventual decline as a prime residential area. Unfortunately, many of the homes on the 2600 block of Jefferson Avenue were demolished. During the 1960s through the 1990s, most of the homes were converted to lower-income multi-family residences. Currently, almost all have been reverted to single-family dwellings. This has restored much of the elegant style to the neighborhood.

== See also ==
- National Register of Historic Places listings in Weber County, Utah
