= Madison Elementary School (Ogden, Utah) =

- U.S. National Register of Historic Places
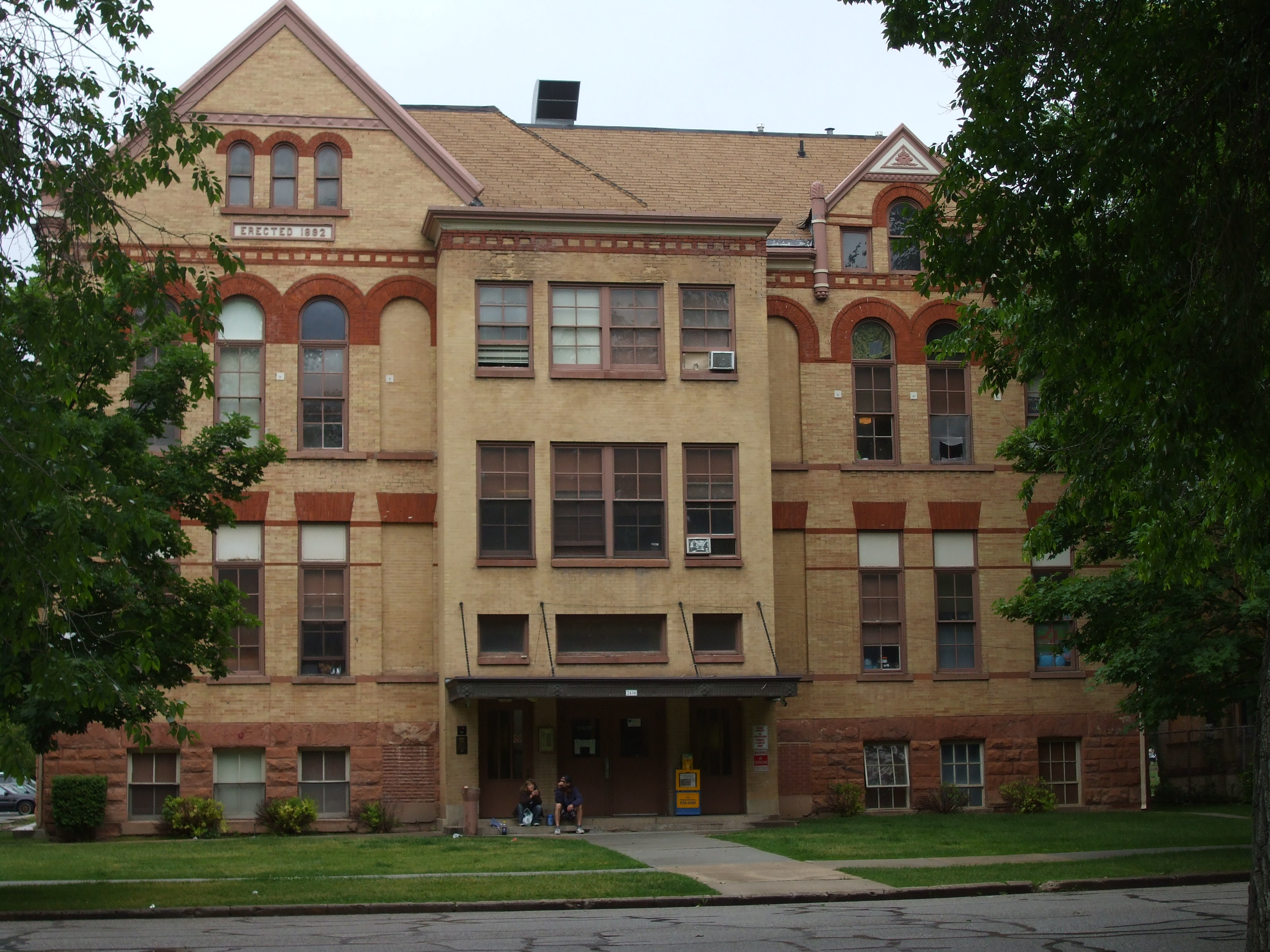

- Location within Utah Location within the United States
- Location: 2434 Madison Ave., Ogden, Utah
- Coordinates: 41°13′18″N 111°57′38″W
- Area: 1.6 acres (0.65 ha)
- Built: 1892
- Architect: Francis C. Woods
- Architectural style: Romanesque Revival
- NRHP reference No.: 82004188
- Added to NRHP: February 19, 1982

The Madison Elementary School in Ogden, Utah, USA is a building built in 1892. It was listed on the National Register of Historic Places in 1982.

It was designed by architect Francis Charles Woods.
