= Francis Charles Woods =

American architect and organ builder (1844–1912)

- Born: January 12, 1844; Glasgow, Scotland
- Died: April 11, 1912 (aged 68); Ogden, Utah, U.S.
- Occupation: Architect
- Spouse: Evelyn Pratt
- Children: 5 sons (including Moroni Charles Woods), 8 daughters
- Relatives: Parley P. Pratt (father-in-law)

Francis Charles Woods (January 12, 1844 - April 11, 1912) was a Scottish-born American architect and organ-builder who designed many buildings in Utah and Idaho. Some of his works are listed on the National Register of Historic Places (NRHP), including the Hotel Brigham (with Julius A. Smith) and the Summit County Courthouse.

Works include:

- St. Joseph's Church (1889), 508 24th Street, Ogden, Utah
- Madison Elementary School (1891–92), 2418 Madison Avenue, Ogden, Utah, NRHP-listed
- Summit County Courthouse (1903), 54 North Main Street, Coalville, Utah, NRHP-listed
- Hotel Brigham (1914), 13 West Forest Street, Brigham City, Utah, NRHP-listed
- South Washington School, Ogden, Utah

He married Evelyn Pratt, on November 5, 1873, in the Endowment House in Salt Lake City

According to a biography written by daughter Phyllis, in Malad City, Idaho, he built "a hotel, homes, stores, and a beautiful courthouse, which stands as a monument to him today. He also worked as a coffin builder while in that city." That courthouse, built in 1882, was Italianate, and was replaced in 1939 by the Oneida County Courthouse

Per the daughter, he designed "the Auditorium" in Pocatello, Idaho. Assuming that's correct, it would be the Auditorium Opera House, either the 1893 reconstruction of an earlier opera house that was damaged in a fire, but which itself was destroyed in a fire in October 1899, or the 1900 new construction in brick. This, like some other Woods works, was Italianate in style, although the front was later modified in Art Deco style, but the Italianate styling can still be seen in its side wall along the alley running beside it. After another fire in 1939, the building was converted into a furniture store, which remained in 1994 and was included in the NRHP listing of the East Side Downtown Historic District.

He also designed a "Mental Hospital" in Blackfoot. He built works as far north as Rexburg, Idaho.

In Ogden, he designed "the Presbyterian Church, Healy hotel, City Police Station, South Washington, Quincy, and Madison schools besides thirteen county schools and numerous stores and residences."

Evelyn and Francis had 13 children, 12 of whom would marry within the Church of Jesus Christ of Latter-day Saints at the Salt Lake City Temple.

Moroni Charles Woods, one of the sons, also became an architect.
