= Hotel Brigham =

Historic building in Brigham City, Utah, US

- U.S. National Register of Historic Places
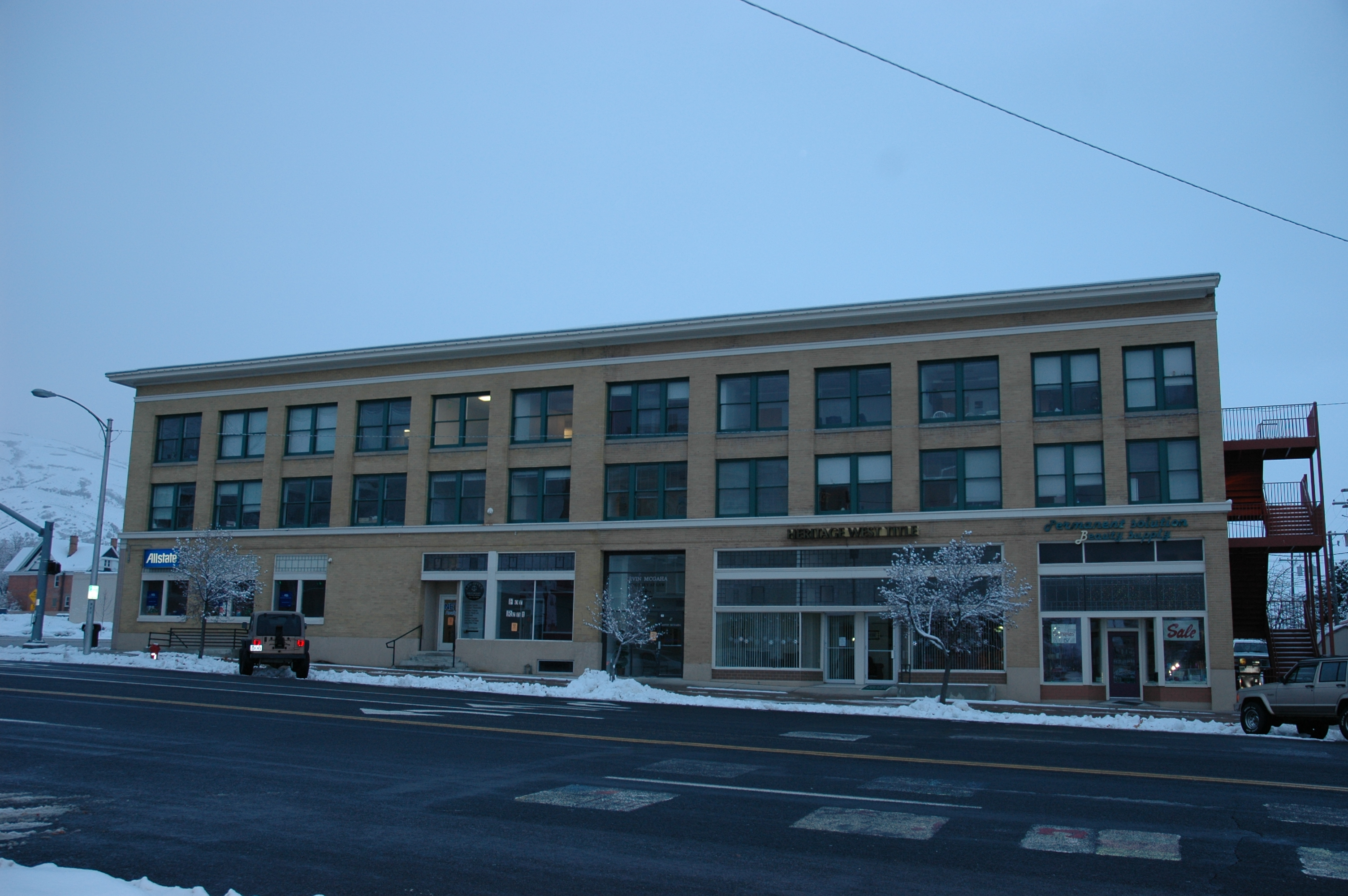
- The hotel in 2010

- Location within Utah Location within the United States
- Location: 13 and 17 West Forest Street, Brigham City, Utah
- Coordinates: 41°30′37″N 112°00′55″W
- Area: 0.2 acres (0.081 ha)
- Built: 1914
- Built by: George Burnham
- Architect: Francis Charles Woods, Julius A. Smith
- Architectural style: Chicago, Commercial Style
- MPS: Brigham City MPS
- NRHP reference No.: 91001543
- Added to NRHP: October 17, 1991

Hotel Brigham is a historic three-story hotel building in Brigham City, Utah. It was built in 1914 by George Burnham for James Knudson, a Mormon businessman, and his wife Amelia. It was designed in the Chicago school style by architects Francis Charles Woods and Julius A. Smith, and expanded ten years later, in 1924. The Knudsons died in the early 1940s, and the hotel was acquired by the Hillam Abstracting and Insurance Agency in 1989. It has been listed on the National Register of Historic Places since October 17, 1991.
