= Ogden/Weber Municipal Building =

- U.S. National Register of Historic Places
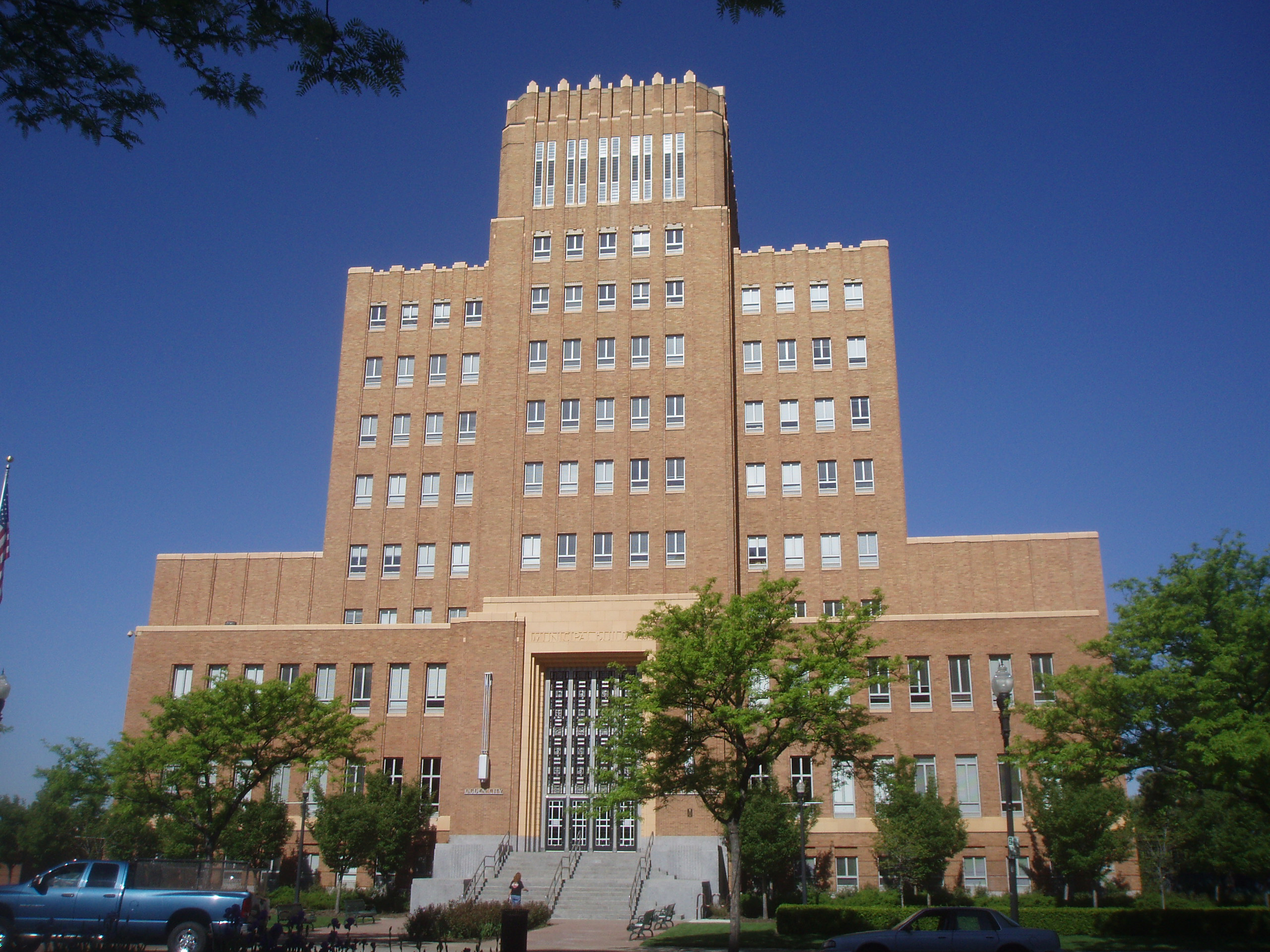

- Location within Utah Location within the United States
- Location: 2541 Washington Blvd., Ogden, Utah
- Coordinates: 41°13′11″N 111°58′13″W
- Area: less than one acre
- Built: 1938-40
- Built by: George A. Whitmeyer & Sons
- Architect: Hodgson and McClenahan
- Architectural style: Art Deco
- MPS: Ogden Art Deco Building TR
- NRHP reference No.: 83003202
- Added to NRHP: June 7, 1983

The Ogden/Weber Municipal Building, at 2541 Washington Blvd. in Ogden, Utah, was built in 1938–1940. It was listed on the National Register of Historic Places in 1983.

It was funded as a Public Works Administration project. It was designed by architects Hodgson and McClenahan in Art Deco style and built by George A. Whitmeyer & Sons. It is built of warm brick and glazed terra cotta.

Its nomination claims that "In many ways it is a 'typical' Art Deco example, resembling the Syracuse Lighting Company Office Building (1932), in Syracuse, New York".
