= Ogden High School =

Location
- 2828 South Harrison Boulevard; Ogden, Utah 84403; United States; 41°12′48″N 111°56′51″W

Information
- Type: Public
- Founded: 1890
- Principal: Shauna Haney
- Staff: 57.02 (FTE)
- Grades: 10-12
- Enrollment: 1,113 (2023–2024)
- Average class size: 3 A Region 13
- Student to teacher ratio: 19.52
- Color
- Mascot: Tiger
- Website: ogdenhigh.ogdensd.org/o/ohs
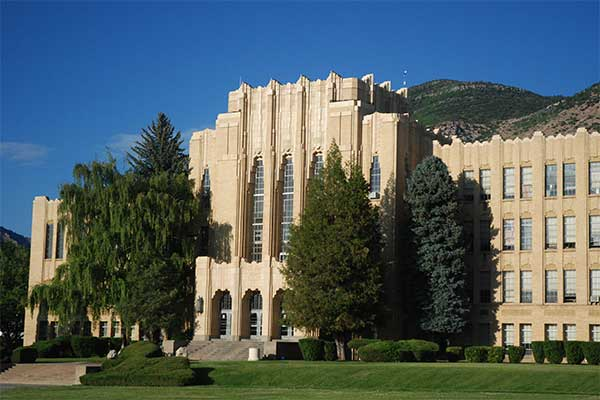

Ogden High School is a secondary school located in Ogden, Utah, educating students in grades 10–12. The school is housed in a historic, Art Deco building opened in 1937, which has since become a landmark of the city. Operated by the Ogden City School District, Ogden High enrolls approximately 1,250 students each year. The school is home to an International Baccalaureate Programme, a Project Lead the Way program and a thriving Life Sciences/Pre-Med program. OHS also offers a dozen AP classes and the AVID program. Ogden High has most recently earned state championships in both marching band and girls soccer. Both teams won state championships in 2019 and 2021. The Ogden High mascot is the Tiger. In 2012, Ogden High School began offering International Baccalaureate courses and in 2014 graduated the first IB Diploma Programme class.

== History ==
As an institution, Ogden High School traces its history back to September 1, 1890 when the first session of public high-school level classes were held in a room of Ogden's Central school building. The high school then moved around to several different structures throughout the city, until 1937, when its current building opened. (Note: A 1902 history of the school, published in the Ogden Standard, claims the school started in September 1889, with a single English course taught in the Central school building.) The school interiors and exterior served as the setting for the fictional Weaver High School in the 1987 film Three O'Clock High.

== 1937 school building ==
The Ogden High School building is recognized as an architectural landmark in Ogden, and was designed by the architectural firm of Hodgson and McClenahan. Other buildings of historical interest designed by Hodgson and McClenahan include Peery's Egyptian Theatre, the Regional Forest Service Building, and the City and County Building. The building was completed in 1937 at a cost over $1 million, reportedly the first high school to exceed that cost.

The building was added to the National Register of Historic Places in 1983.

=== Renovations ===
In 2004, the National Trust for Historic Preservation provided a $10,000,000 matching grant to restore Ogden High School. In 2006 a bond was passed by the district for the remodeling of Ogden High School, including a new cafeteria, gym complex, and performing arts center in the first stage, along with other district requirements. The blueprint process began in December 2006.

The renovation project was completed in 2012 at a cost of $64 million, funded by tax revenues, large donations, and community fundraising. In 2013 the school and the project principals won a preservation award from the National Trust for Historic Preservation.

The main parking lots and the ceramics building were demolished in the summer of 2007. New parking lots for faculty and visitors were built on the north end facing 28th Street, and the south end in the former 29th Street corridor. A commons area is being constructed on the site of the old parking lot.

The original OHS cafeteria closed in March 2008 for an expansion/remodeling project.

Renovations of the school include removing asbestos, building a gym complex and science labs, and restoring the auditorium and the rotunda areas. Construction of a new state-of-the-art gym/athletic complex has been completed and the pool was refurbished to become an eight-lane competition pool which was slated to reopen in winter 2014.

== Notable alumni ==
- Joe Aguirre, NFL player
- John B. Arrington, Utah state legislator
- Clyde Brock, CFL and NFL player
- Val A. Browning, son of John Browning
- Arnie Ferrin, University of Utah Men's Basketball (Utes) and NBA player
- Dave Gray, professional baseball player
- Wataru Misaka, NBA player
- Glen Redd, NFL player
- Sarah Sellers, runner-up at 2018 Boston Marathon
- Bob Sneddon, NFL
- Gedde Watanabe, American actor

== Photo gallery ==
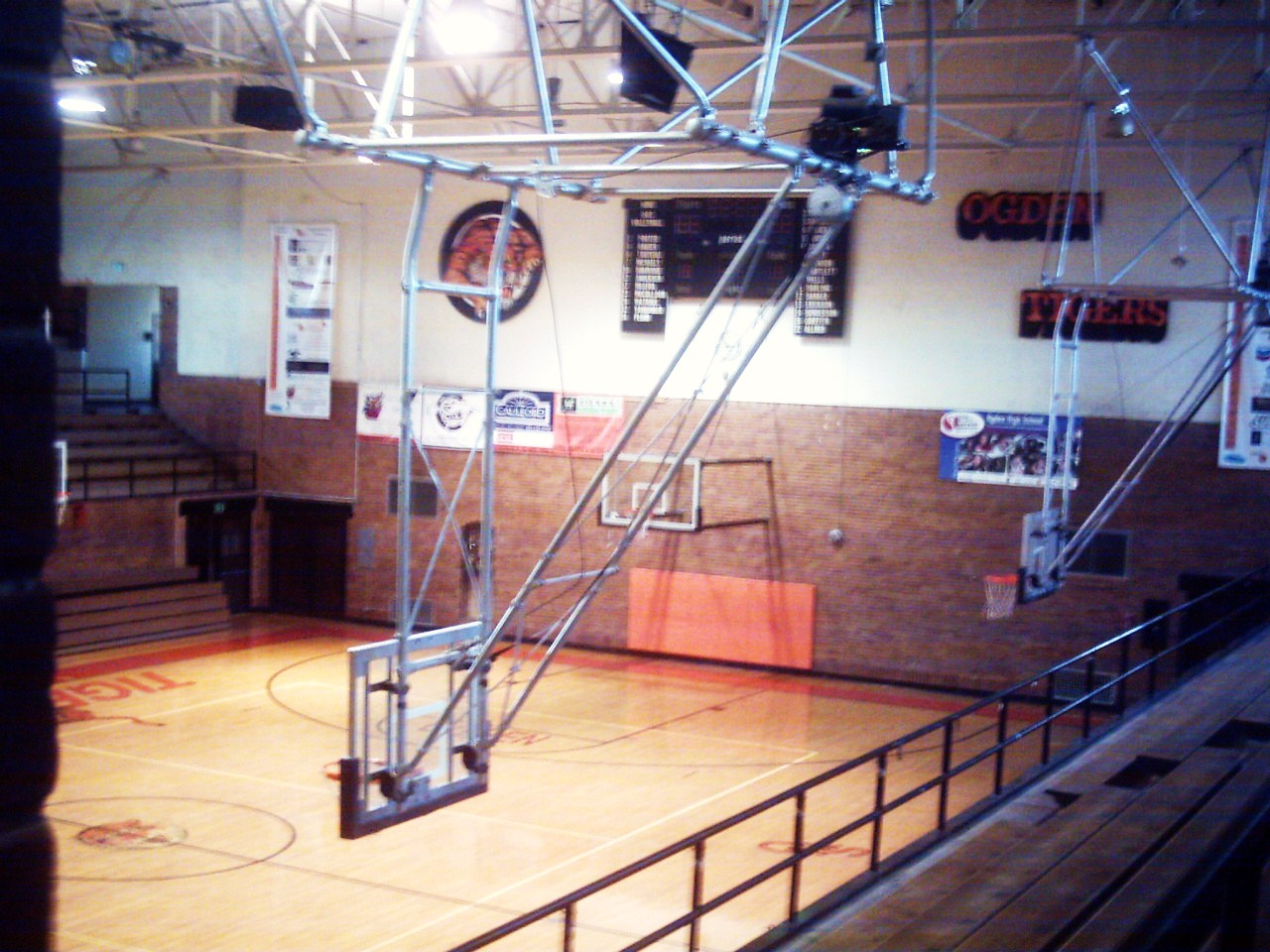
OHS Tiger Gym 1

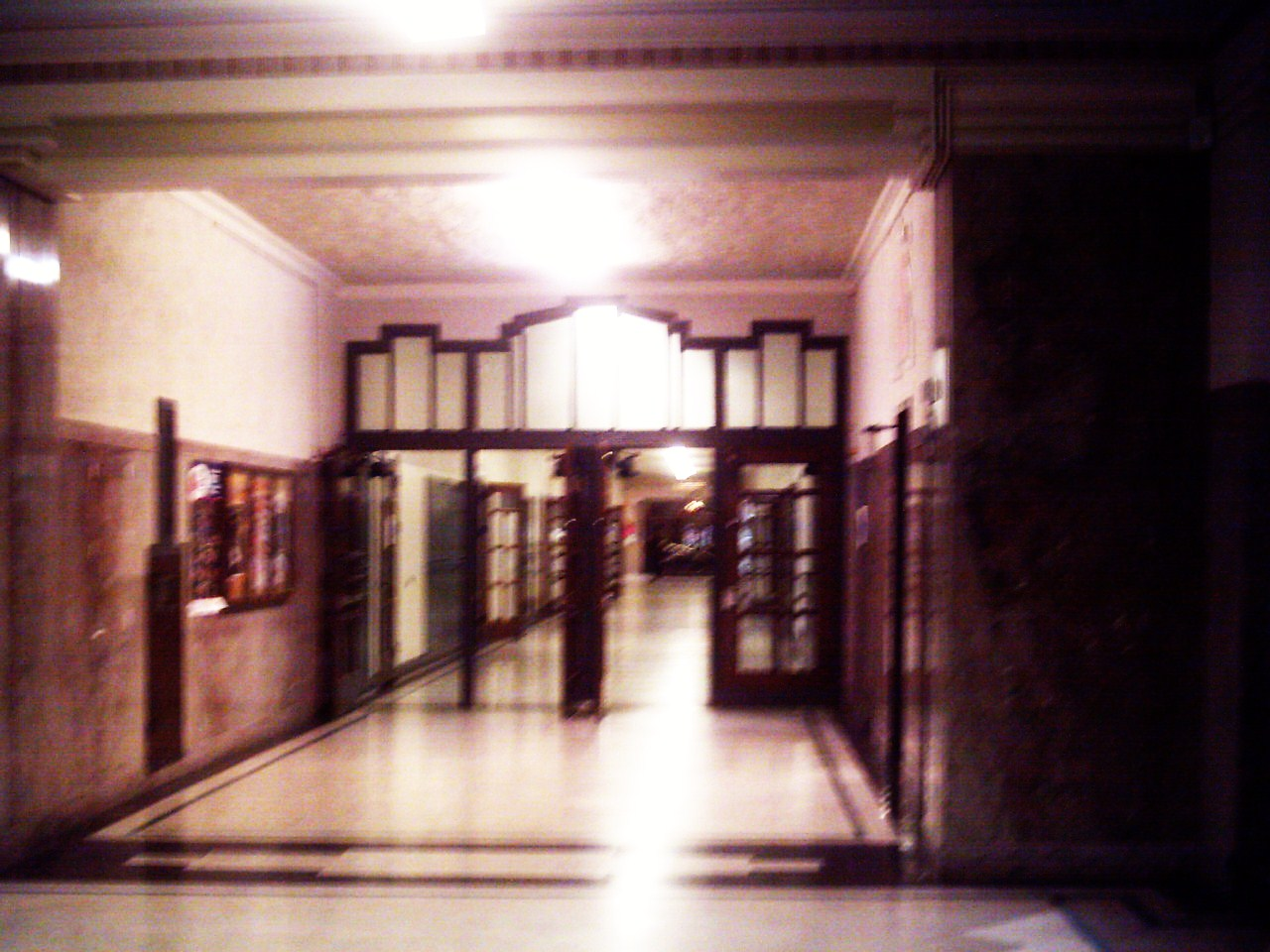
Main hallway on first floor

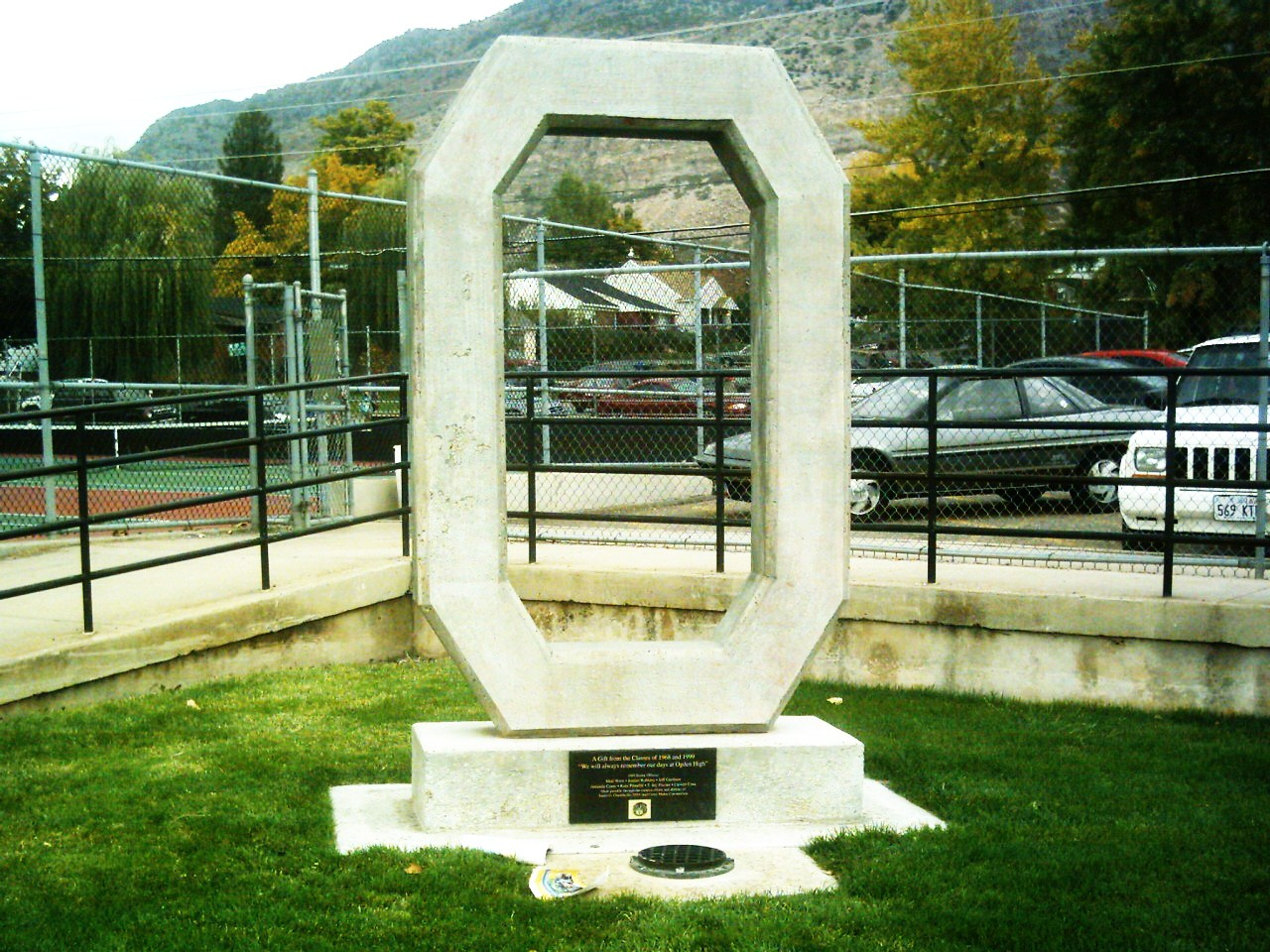
The "O" at the football stadium

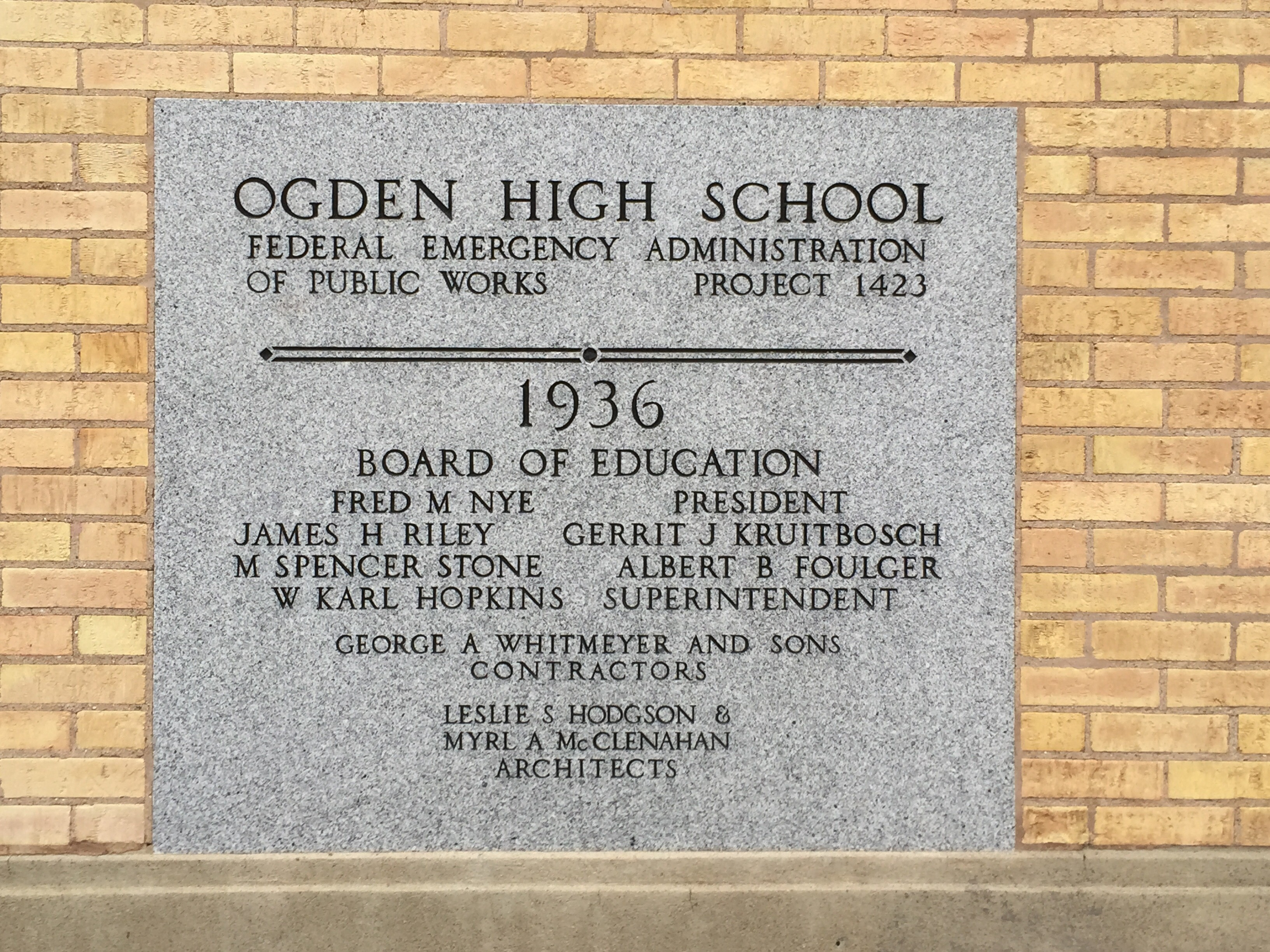
Granite memorial plaque commemorating original construction in 1936

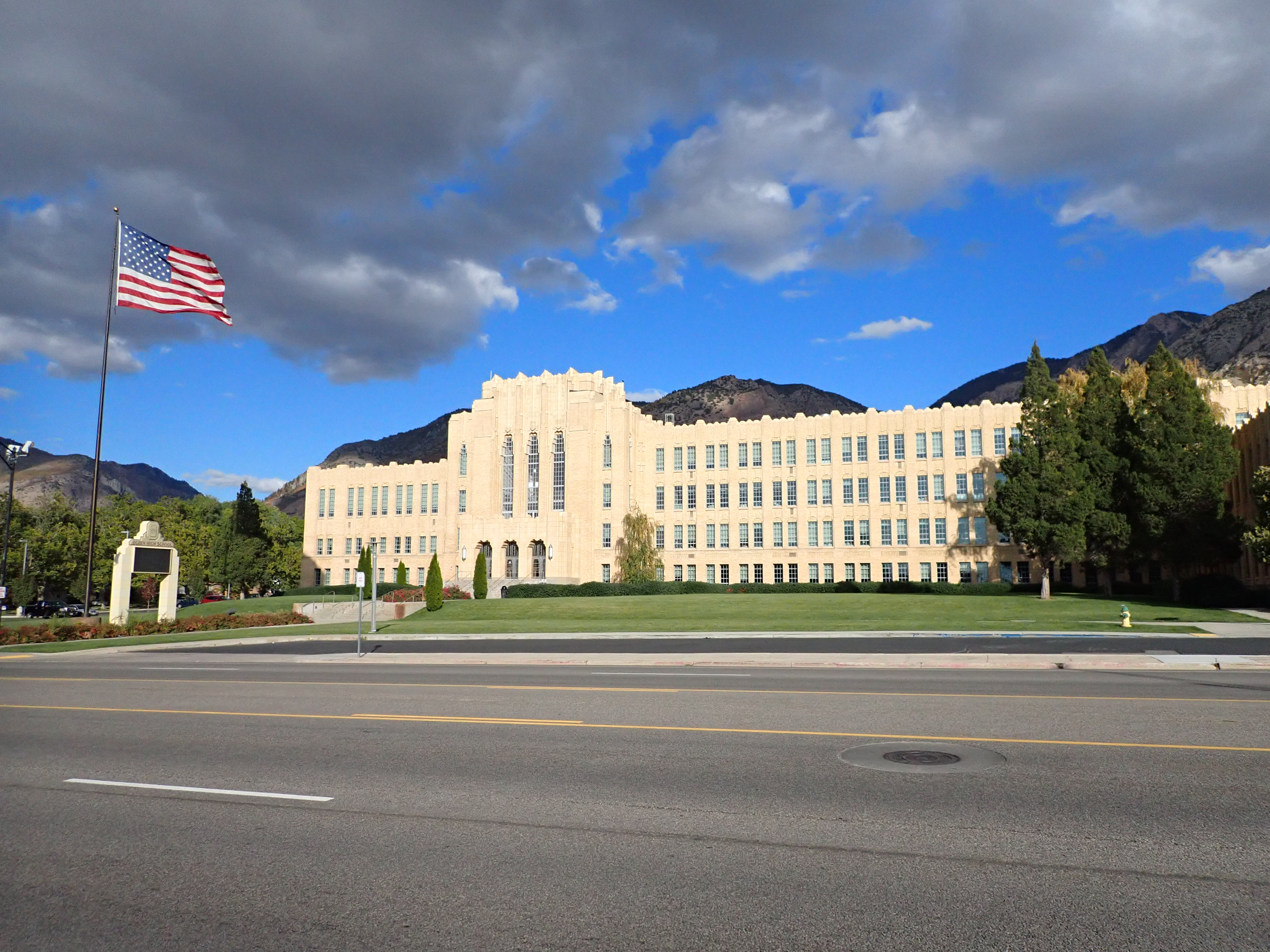
Ogden High School, 2019
