= Moroni Charles Woods =

American architect and Mormon leader

- Born: January 11, 1885; Malad, Idaho, U.S.
- Died: May 7, 1938 (aged 53); Ogden, Utah, U.S.
- Occupation: Architect
- Spouse: Sarah Elline Shaw
- Children: 2 sons, 2 daughters
- Parent: Francis Charles Woods
- Relatives: Parley P. Pratt (maternal grandfather)

Moroni Charles Woods (January 11, 1885 - May 7, 1938) was an American architect and Mormon leader. He designed many private residences, commercial and public buildings, schools and churches in Utah, including the NRHP-listed Heber Scowcroft House, and he was the president of the L.D.S. mission in New Zealand from 1935 to 1938.

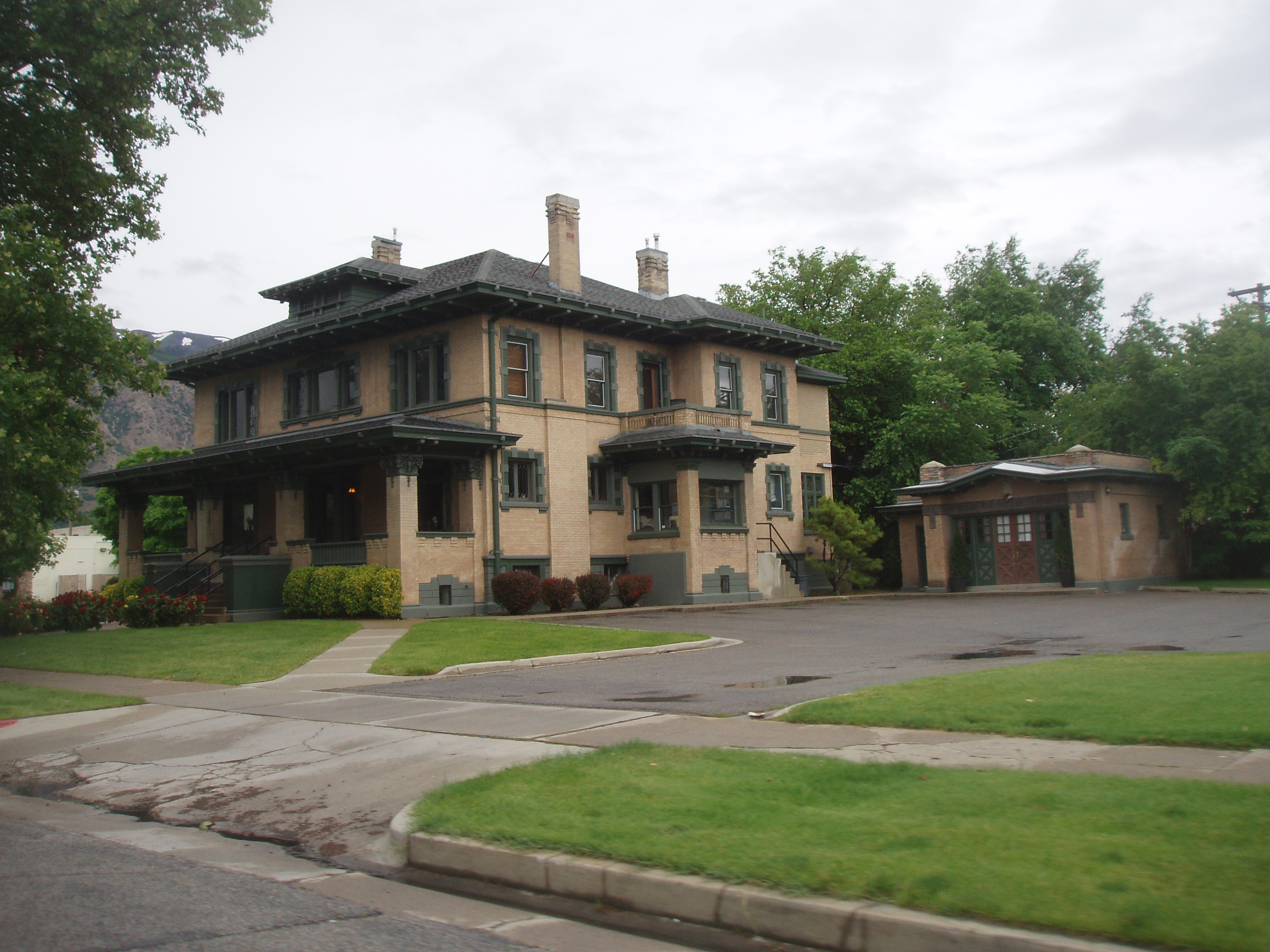
The Heber Scowcroft House in Ogden, Utah.

Works include:

- Thirteenth Ward (1919), a.k.a. Art Center & Academy, Inc., Ogden, Utah
- Scowcroft House (1909), 105 23rd Street, Ogden, Utah
- Weber State University Gymnasium, Weber State College Campus, Ogden, Utah
