= Ralph Bristol House =

Historic structure, Ogden, Utah, U.S.

Coordinates: 41°13′15″N 111°57′03″W

- Interactive map of the Ralph Bristol House area

General information
- Type: House
- Location: 2480 Van Buren Avenue, Ogden, Utah
- Construction started: 1912

The Ralph Bristol House is a home in Ogden, Utah, United States that was built around 1912 by businessman Ralph Bristol. It is located at 2480 Van Buren Avenue. The wrought iron porch roof is said to have been a gift from a French political figure. It is also rumored that Leroy Eccles built his larger and more stately house at 1029 25th Street in response to Mr. Bristol's house. (Mr. Eccles previously resi ded at 2555 Eccles Avenue.)
