= Summit County Courthouse (Utah) =

- U.S. National Register of Historic Places
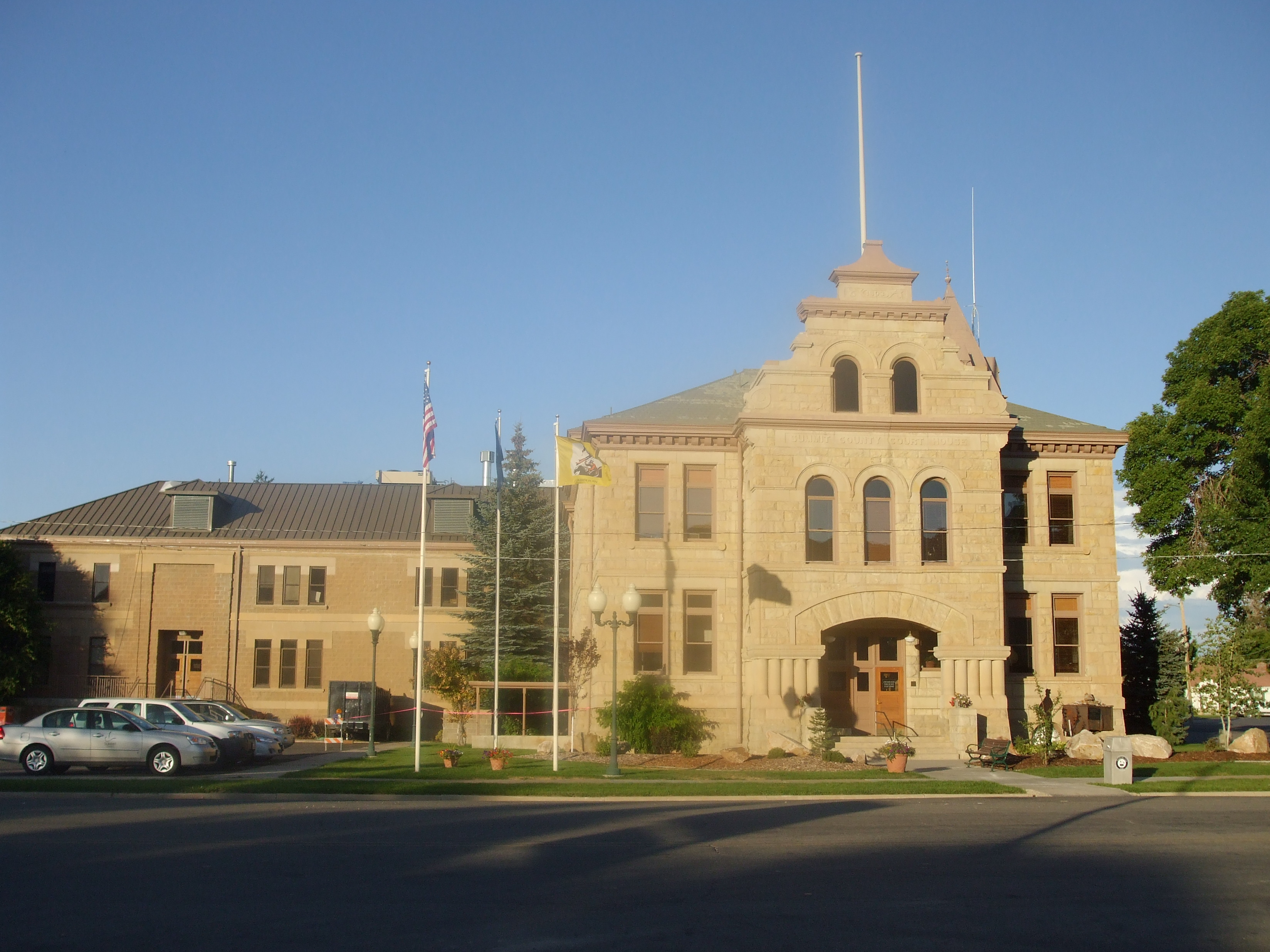

- Location within Utah Location within the United States
- Location: Main St., Coalville, Utah
- Coordinates: 40°55′05″N 111°23′53″W
- Area: less than one acre
- Built: 1903
- Architect: F.C. Woods & Co.
- Architectural style: Romanesque Revival
- NRHP reference No.: 78002694
- Added to NRHP: December 15, 1978

The Summit County Courthouse in Coalville, Utah, on Main St., was built in 1903. It was listed on the National Register of Historic Places in 1978.

Its construction settled a running dispute about where the county seat would be located. The newspaper of Park City, Utah was disappointed but came around to agree that the building would serve the county well.

It was designed by F.C. Woods & Co. of Ogden, Utah, and it was built by contractors E. J. Beggs & J. H. Salmon.

It is Romanesque Revival in style.
