= United States Forest Service Building (Ogden, Utah) =

Historic government building in Ogden, Utah, United States

- US Forest Service Building
- U.S. National Register of Historic Places
- U.S. Historic district – Contributing property
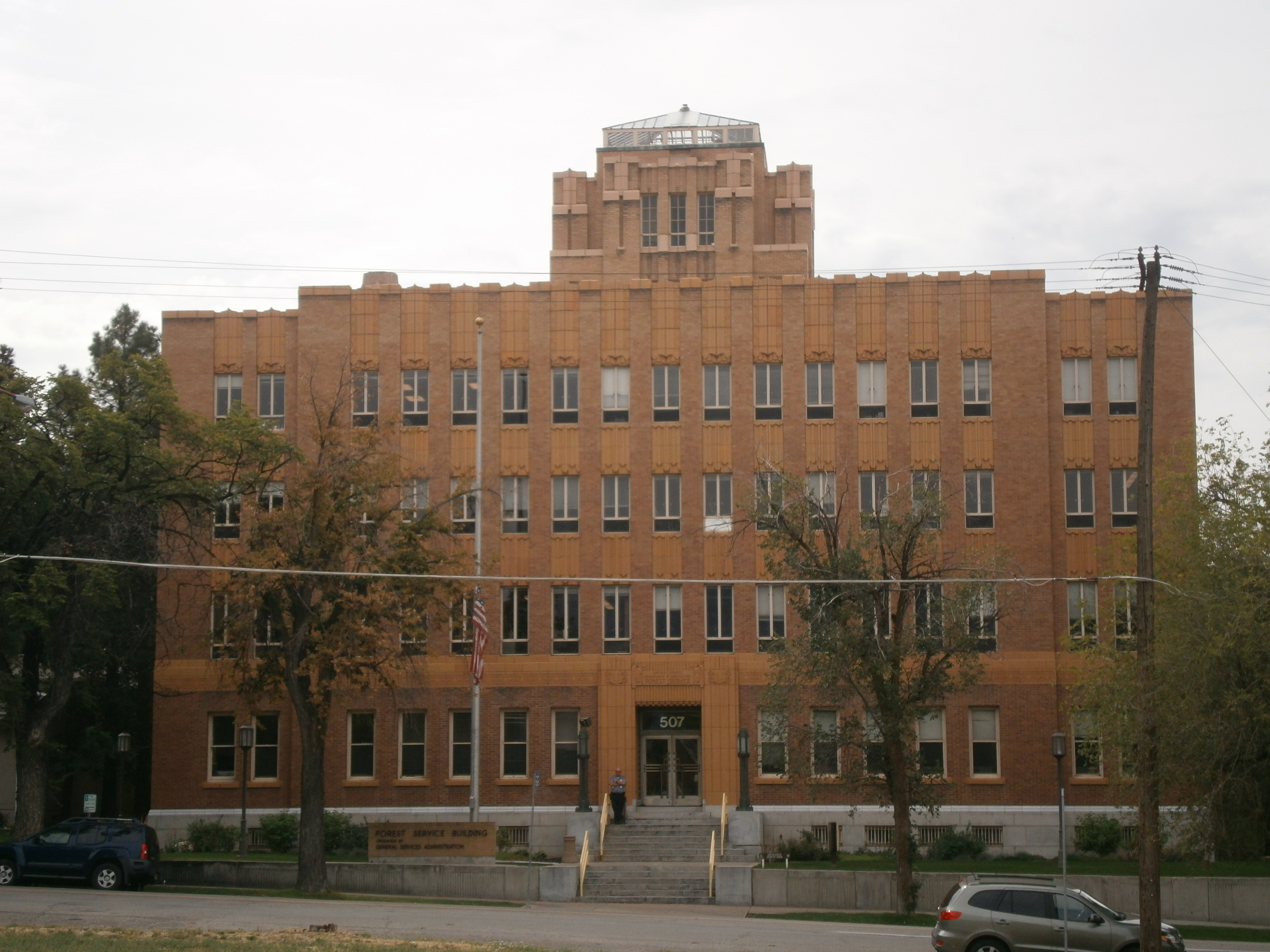
- View from across 25th Street

- Location within Utah Location within the United States
- Nearest city: Ogden, Utah
- Coordinates: 41°13′13″N 111°58′0″W
- Built: 1933
- Architect: Hodgson, Leslie S.; et al.
- Architectural style: Art Deco
- Part of: Ogden Central Bench Historic District (ID03000055)
- MPS: Ogden Art Deco Building TR
- NRHP reference No.: 06000432

Significant dates
- Added to NRHP: May 24, 2006
- Designated CP: July 22, 2005

The U.S. Forest Service Building is a historic building within the Ogden Central Bench Historic District in Ogden, Utah, United States, owned by the United States federal government. Located at 507 25th Street, it is listed as a Historic Federal Building (GSA Building #: UT0010ZZ), and was constructed during the years 1933–1934. Its primary task was to provide offices for the U.S. Forest Service Intermountain Region, the Experimental Station, and the Supply Depot. The building was listed on the National Register of Historic Places in 2006.

== Significance ==
The Ogden architectural firm of Hodgson & McClenahan began the project in 1932, while construction began in 1933. Murch Brothers Construction, of St. Louis, Missouri, finished construction in 1934.

The Forest Service Building was one of the first buildings built under the Works Progress Administration (WPA). Its construction was a result of the government's desire to stimulate growth during the Great Depression. As the earliest Federal building in Ogden, it paved a way for what has become the largest employer in Ogden.

The building is a fine example of the Art Deco building style. This style incorporates detailed decorative surfaces that include stepped silhouettes and geometric detailing. It is one of three buildings in Ogden that adhere to this style, all of which are included in a National Register Thematic Nomination "Ogden Art Deco Buildings." The State of Utah placed a historical marker in the main lobby to acknowledge this significance.

The offices of the U.S. Forest Service have remained operational to the present day. The Internal Revenue Service and the USDA Office of General Counsel also share offices in the building. Because of the unique nature of the building, it has become a well-known landmark. Few modifications have been made to the building and it has been well maintained over the years.

== Building history ==
In 1908, the U.S. Forest Service selected the city of Ogden as the location for its district headquarters. Ogden was chosen over Salt Lake City because it had more favorable railroad rates, more local amenities, and a stronger business community. Design and construction work on the headquarters building did not begin until the 1930s. The building, located on the southeast corner of the inter-section of Twenty-fifth Street and Adams Avenue, was one of the first in the nation to be funded by the Works Progress Administration (WPA). The WPA was the largest agency of President Franklin Delano Roosevelt's New Deal program, which was designed to stimulate the economy during the Great Depression.

Federal officials awarded the design contract to the local architectural firm of Hodgson & McClenahan. Working under the supervision of federal construction engineer Clement J. Gerber and Acting Supervising Architect of the Treasury James A. Wetmore, Leslie Hodgson developed design concept sketches and partner Myrl McClenahan produced working drawings. Both men were noted for their perfectionism and concern with detail. The resulting building is an innovative example of the Art Deco style of architecture, which Hodgson & McClenahan popularized in Ogden. In late 1932, Murch Brothers Construction Company of St. Louis, Missouri, received the contract to construct the building and on-site work began in January 1933.

The building quickly became a local landmark, due in large part to its remarkable appearance in a largely residential area. In addition to its architectural merit, the building helped to establish Ogden as an important center of federal activity. Since its construction, only minimal alterations have been made to the building, resulting in a very high level of architectural integrity. Original storage areas were renovated into offices between 1939 and 1940, and roofing was replaced and skylights removed in 1963.

The U.S. Forest Service Building was first listed in the National Register of Historic Places in 1983 as part of the Ogden Art Deco Buildings Thematic Resources Nomination, which recognizes the town's significant Art Deco architecture. In 2006, the building was individually listed in the National Register. The U.S. Forest Service continues to utilize the building to house its Ogden Ranger District, Office of General Counsel, and Intermountain Research Station staff.

== Architecture ==
The building is a skillfully executed example of the Art Deco style of architecture, which features a Modern appeal, vertical emphasis, and stylized ornamentation. Distinctive stepped, linear forms and silhouettes recur in components of the building, as do Art-Deco motifs such as chevrons, sunbursts, and zigzags. The four-story building is clad in brick that is darker tan in color at the base and gradually transitions to lighter tones of beige at the upper stories. In order to achieve the desired color gradation, the architects employed eight shades of brick and were actively involved in the placement of the masonry. The mortar and terra-cotta detailing match the brickwork and enhance the progressive shading.

The building has a rectangular footprint at the basement and first story levels. The second through fourth stories are constructed within a U-shaped light court to allow natural illumination of the interior. The reinforced-concrete frame structure is enclosed in a brick and terra-cotta curtain wall and rests on a grey granite foundation made of blocks from the Raymond Granite quarry in California. A terra-cotta water table with a matching gray glaze tops the foundation. The first and second stories are visually separated by a terra-cotta stringcourse with geometric and floral patterns.

The symmetrical facade, which faces Twenty-fifth Street, has slightly recessed bays at either end. The facade is dominated by regularly spaced windows with aluminum mullions. Tall brick pilasters emphasize the building's verticality. The window openings are topped by terra-cotta spandrels with sharply molded projecting vertical apexes. The spandrels also feature zigzag motifs and stylized foliated decorations. The flat roof contains a centrally placed three-story penthouse tower with a glass-topped greenhouse used for agency studies and experiments. The penthouse is executed with the linear stepped pattern and features terra-cotta trim with chevrons. A tall brick chimney, which displays the same skillful color gradation, is located at the southeast corner of the building.

Access to the interior is gained through the main central entrance, which contains a recessed doorway articulated by a wide, incised surround. Above the doorway, a panel identifying the building as a U.S. Forest Service facility is flanked by two carved, stylized eagles. The service's insignia, which includes a tree superimposed on a shield, is located on each side of the panel. Two Art Deco street lamps with a stepped pattern flank the entrance and feature sunburst and chevron ornamentation. The main entry doors are glass with etched nickel-bronze frames and handles with a stepped, rectilinear arrangement.

The interior spaces are richly ornamented, a typical feature of the Art Deco style. The vestibule and main lobby are identically detailed. Utah Golden Travise marble covers the walls and Verde Antique marble forms the baseboard. The walls are topped with an elaborate cast-plaster crown molding that is an Art-Deco interpretation of the traditional egg-and-dart motif. A metallic silver glaze covers the molding. The cornices replicate the stepped pattern found throughout the building. Centrally placed silver foil appliques adorn the ceilings. The central staircase, which is accessed from the lobby through an arched opening with stepped, rectilinear forms, is clad in the same marble found in the lobby and has wood handrails with octagonal cross sections. Similar arched openings lead from the lobby to the east and west corridors. The walls of the corridors retain the original wood wainscot cap with the ubiquitous stepped profile. While sections of flooring have been replaced or covered, select areas retain original rubber tiles that were laid in a tri-color diamond pattern.

== Significant events ==
- 1908 U.S. Forest Service establishes regional headquarters in Ogden
- 1932 Ogden architectural firm Hodgson & McClenahan designs building
- 1933-1934 Building constructed
- 1983 Building listed in the National Register of Historic Places as part of the Ogden Art Deco Buildings Thematic Resources Nomination
- 2006 Building individually listed in the National Register of Historic Places

== Building facts ==
- Location: 507 Twenty-fifth Street
- Architects: Hodgson & McClenahan
- Construction Dates: 1933-1934
- Architectural Style: Art Deco
- Landmark Status: Listed in the National Register of Historic Places
- Primary Materials: Buff-colored Brick; Terra Cotta
- Prominent Features: Striking, Stepped Art-Deco Profile; Stylized Art-Deco Motifs

== See also ==
- National Register of Historic Places listings in Weber County, Utah
