= Leslie S. Hodgson =

American architect

Leslie Simmons Hodgson (born December 18, 1879, in Salt Lake City, died July 24, 1947) was an architect in the Weber County, Utah, United States area from about 1906 to 1947.

Hodgson was born in Salt Lake City. As a young man, he studied with several architects, including Frank Lloyd Wright. In Utah he was employed as a draughtsman under Richard K. A. Kletting and Ware & Treganza. He moved to Ogden in 1906, and partnered with Julius A. Smith from 1906 to 1910. During that time he designed several of the houses in the David Eccles Subdivision. In 1919, he partnered with Myrl A. McClenahan.

During his 40-year career, Hodgson designed more than 75 buildings. He was best known for his art deco style, as seen in Ogden High School. He was also known for Prairie School style, seen in the David Eccles Subdivision, and various period revival styles, seen in the Bigelow-Ben Lomond Hotel and Peery's Egyptian Theater.

Hodgson was the official architect for the Ogden School board for 25 years, and an architect for federal agencies during World War II.

== Images of works ==
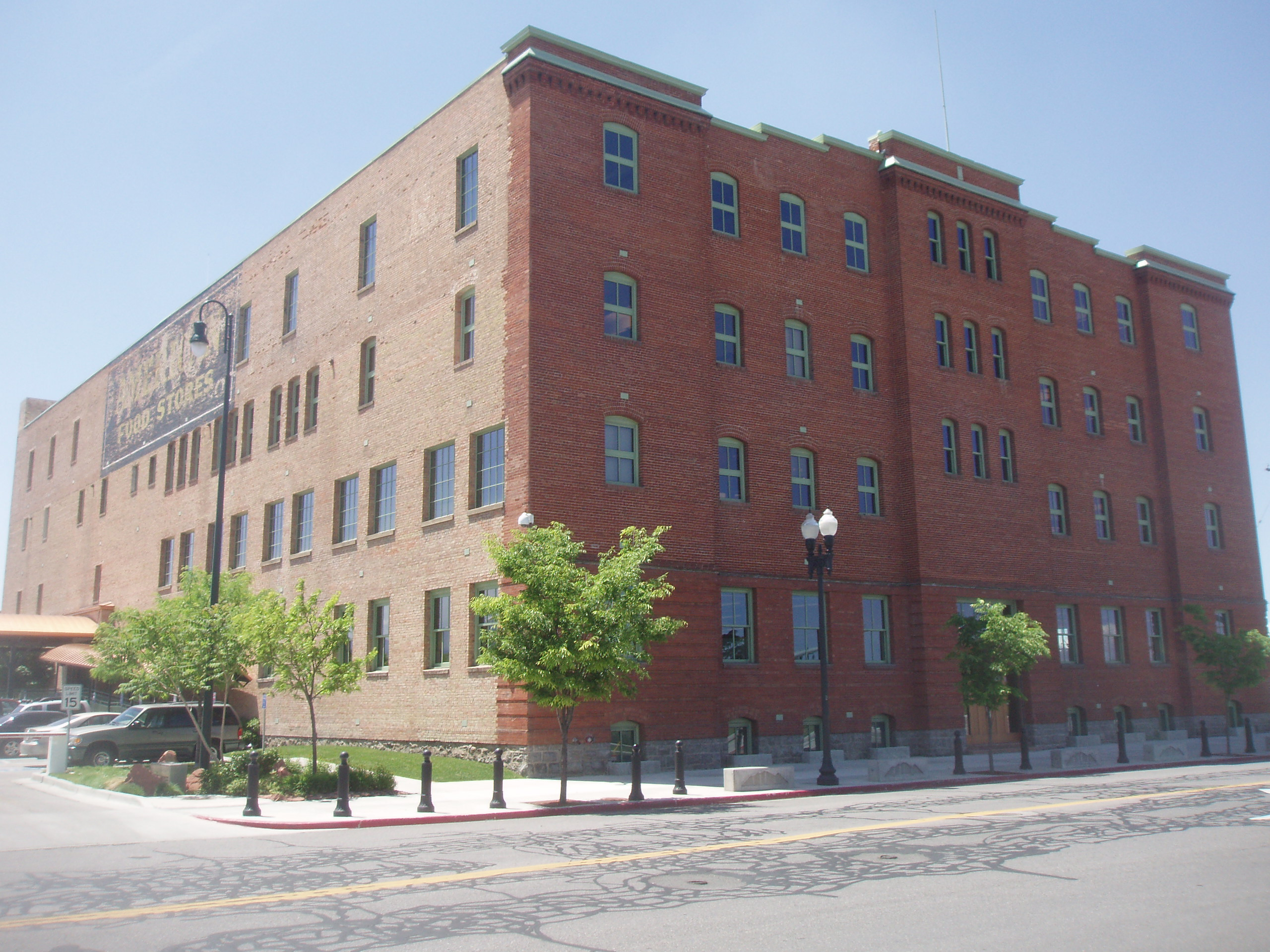
Scowcroft Warehouse (1906)

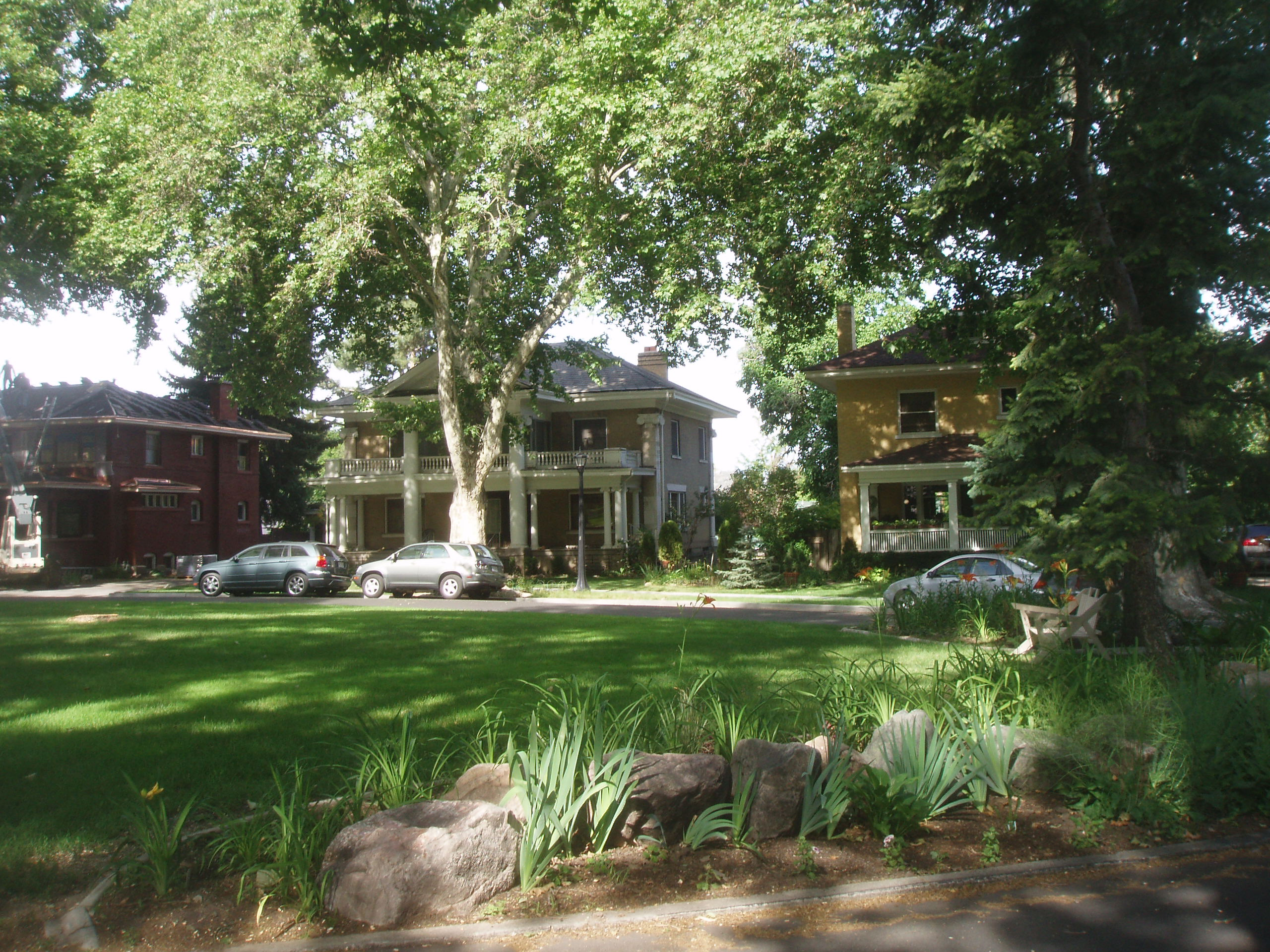
David Eccles Subdivision (1906-1910)

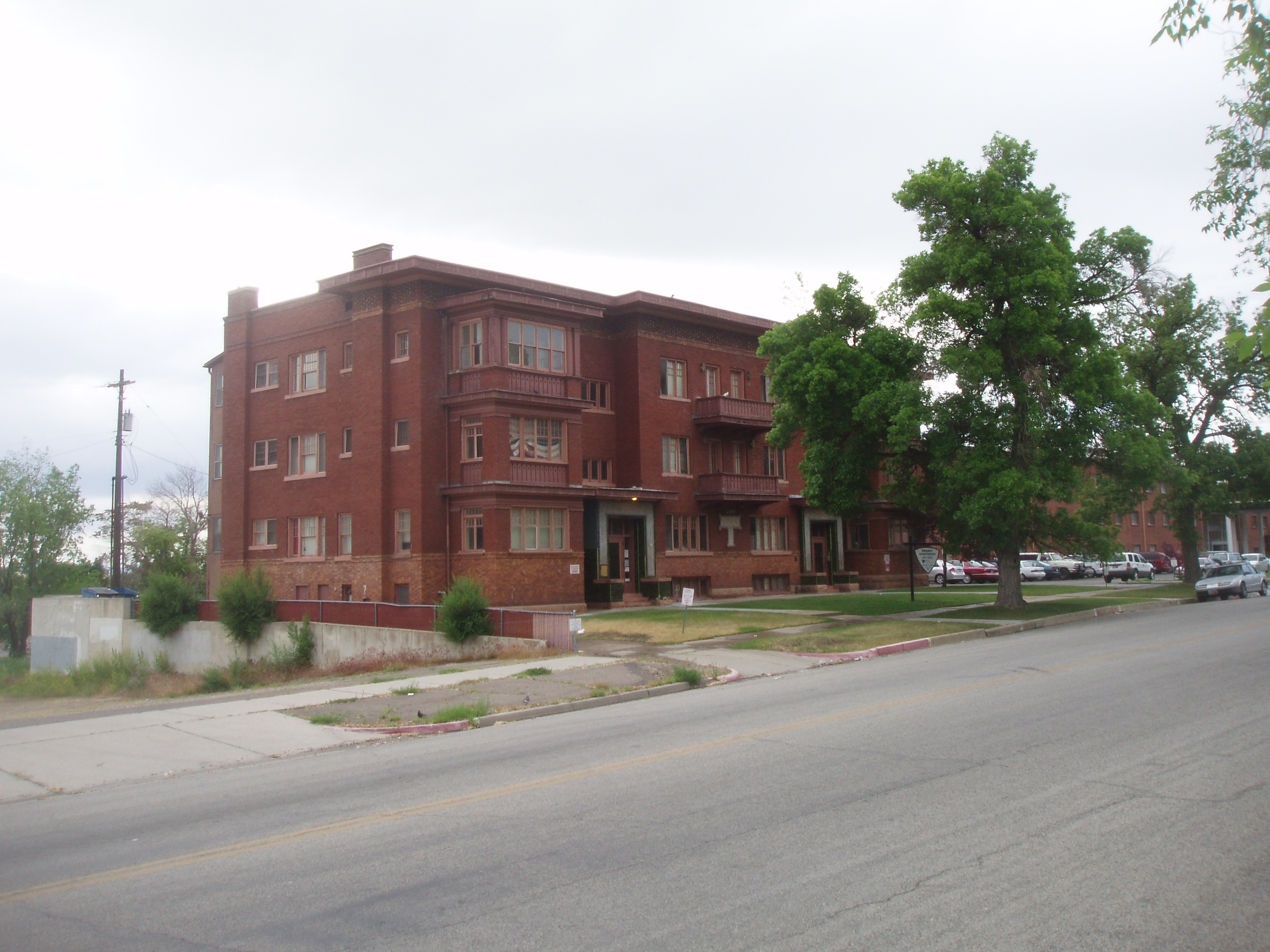
Peery Apartments (1910)

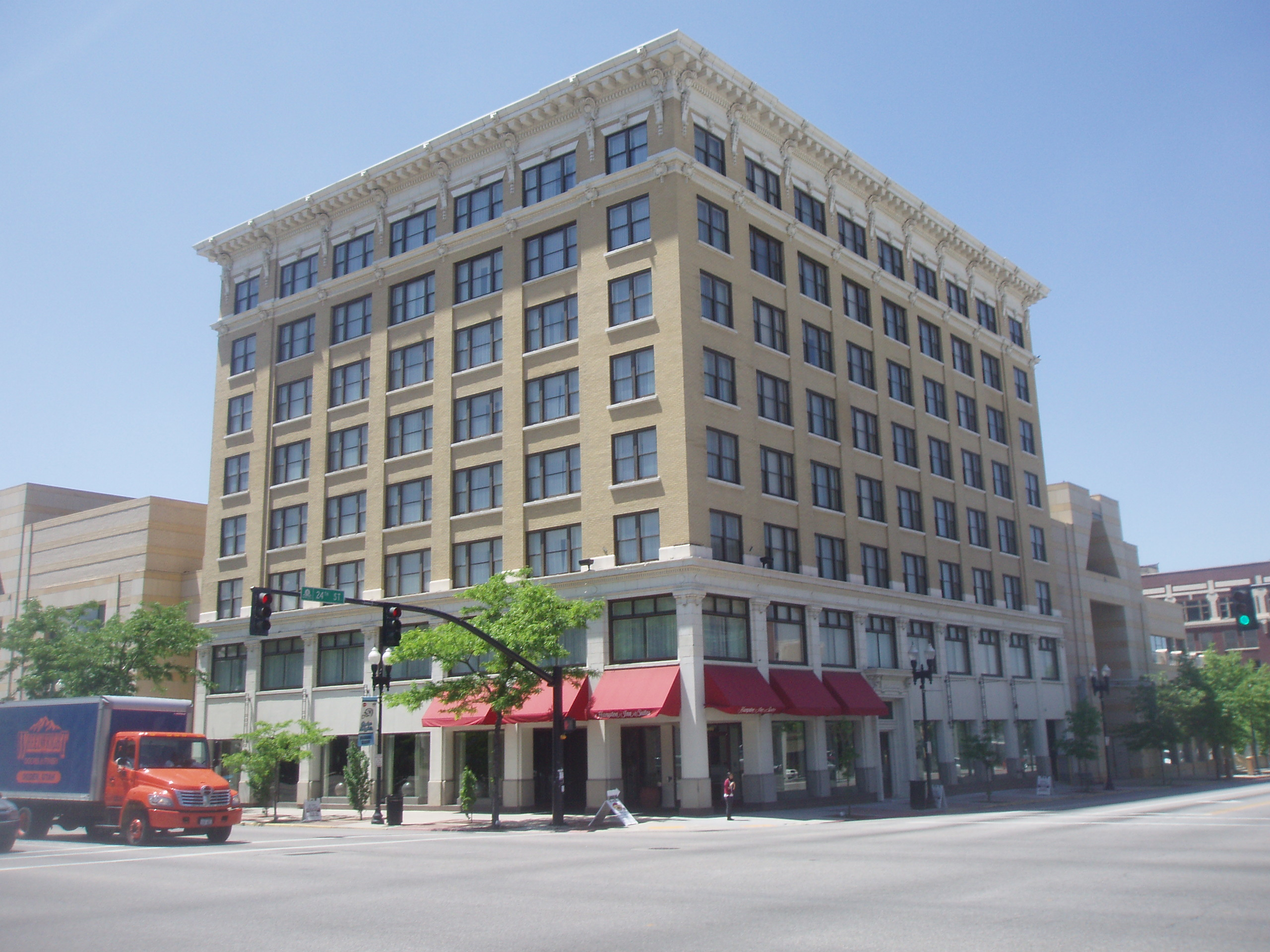
Eccles Building (1913)

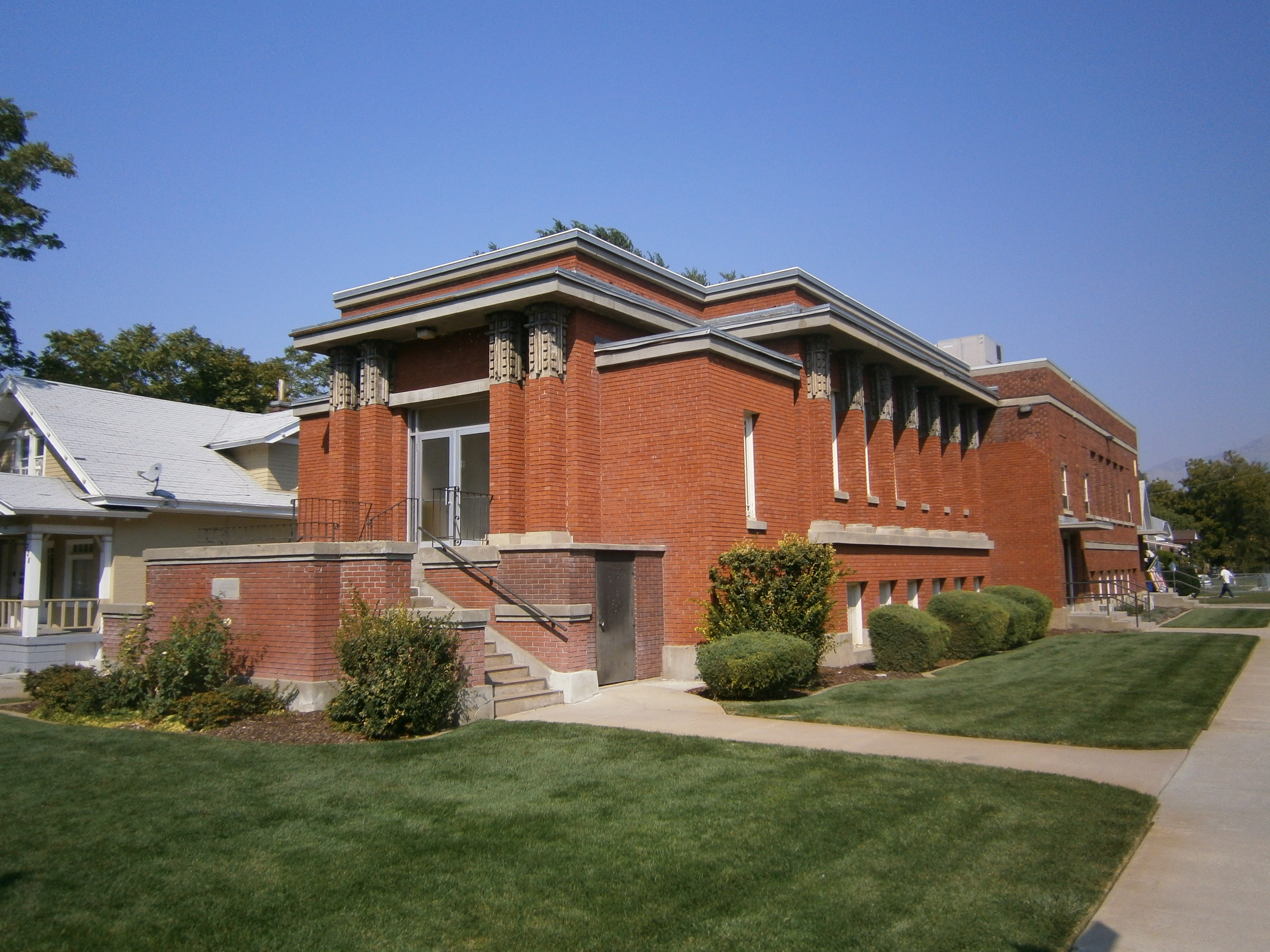
LDS Branch for the Deaf (1916)

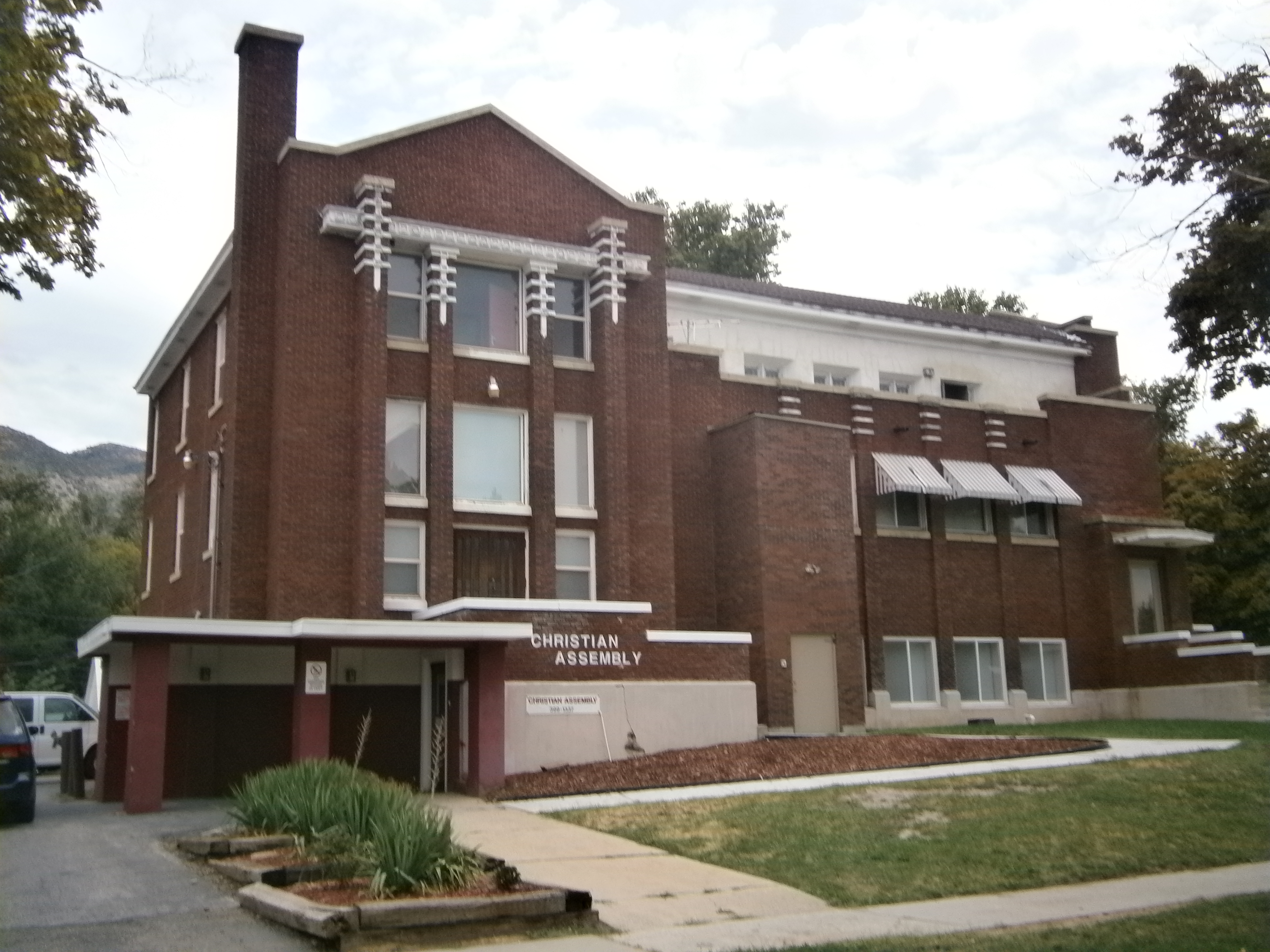
Ogden 13th Ward Chapel (1922)

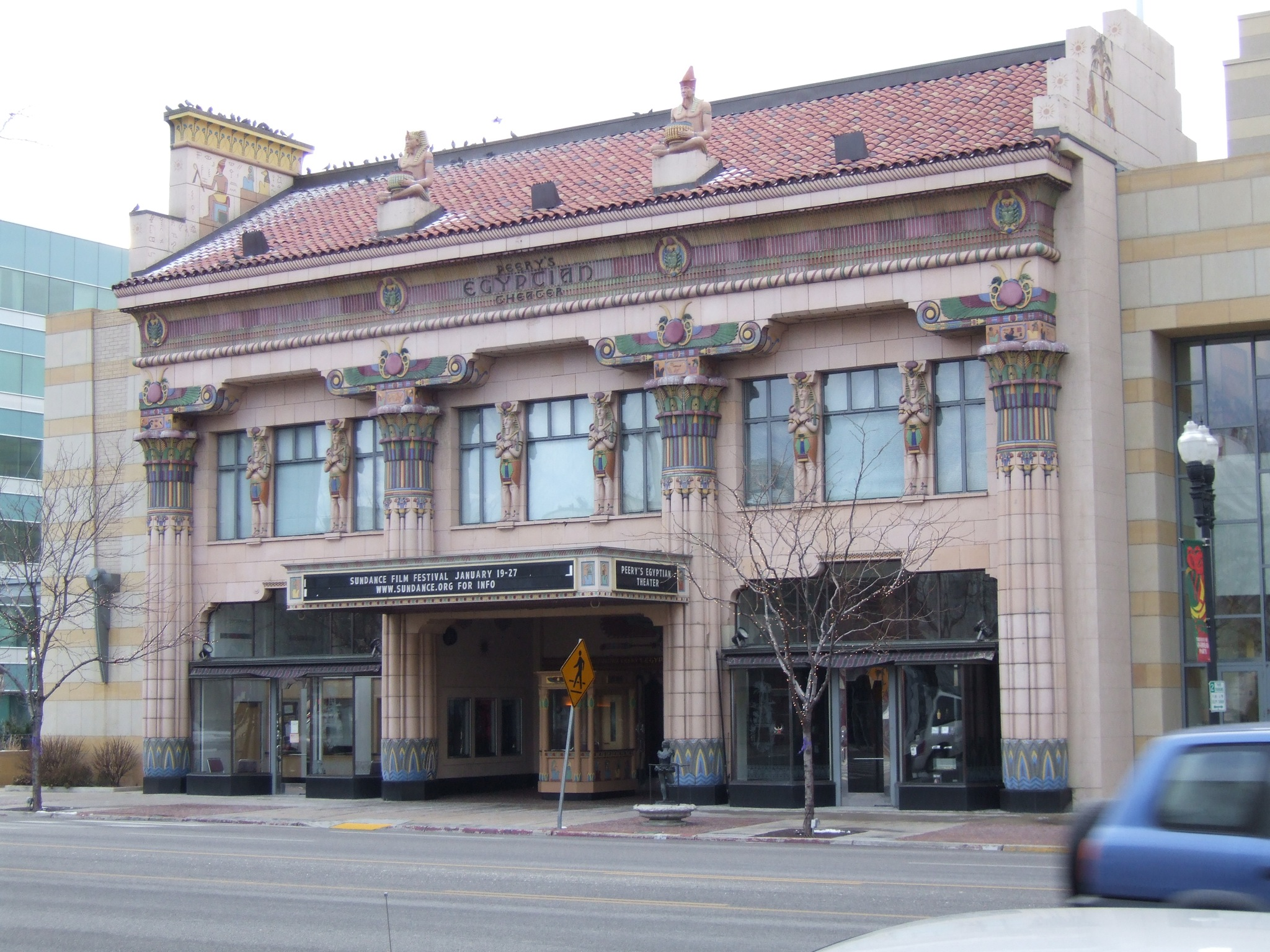
Peery's Egyptian Theater (1924)

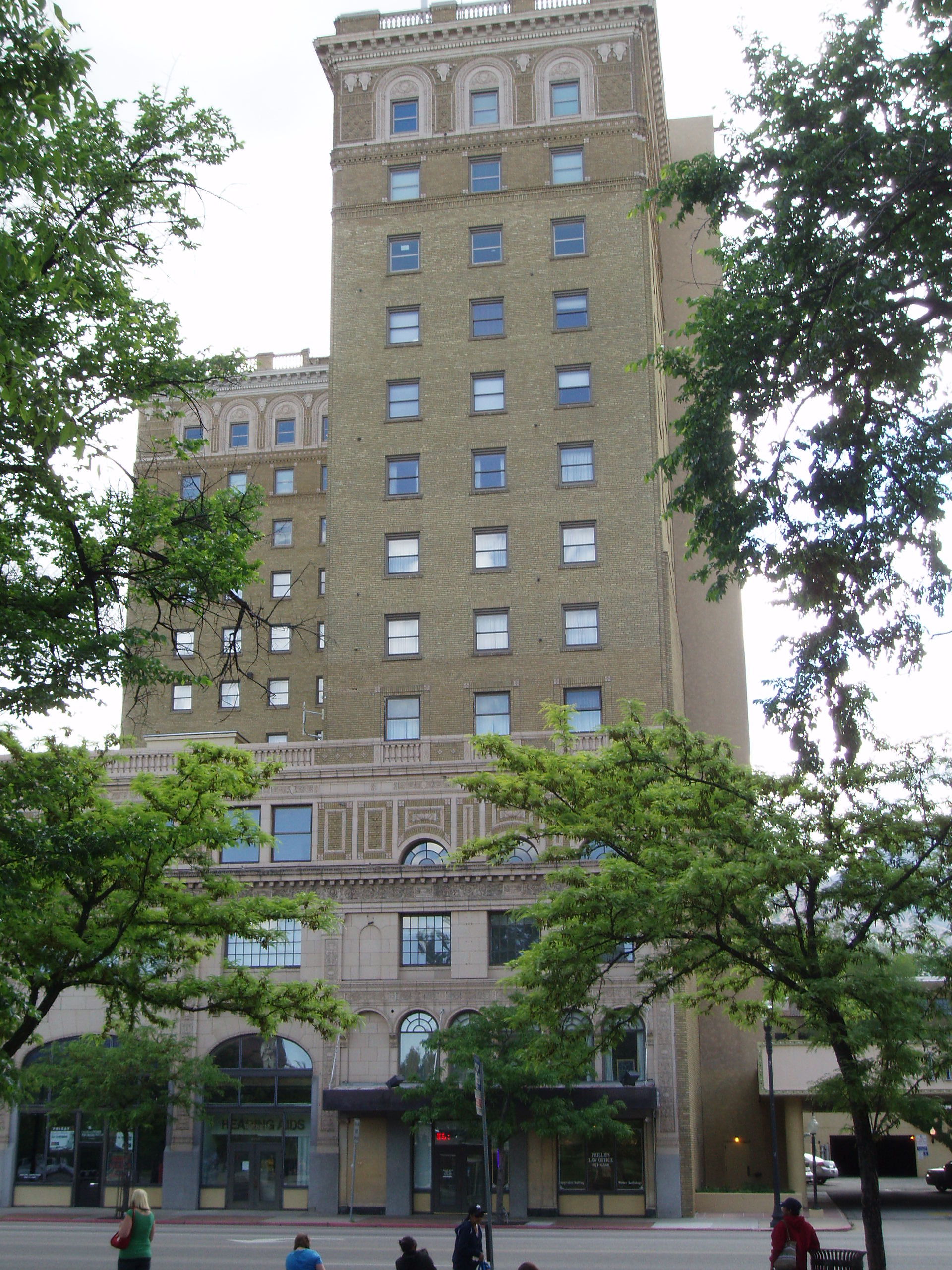
Bigelow-Ben Lomond Hotel (1927)

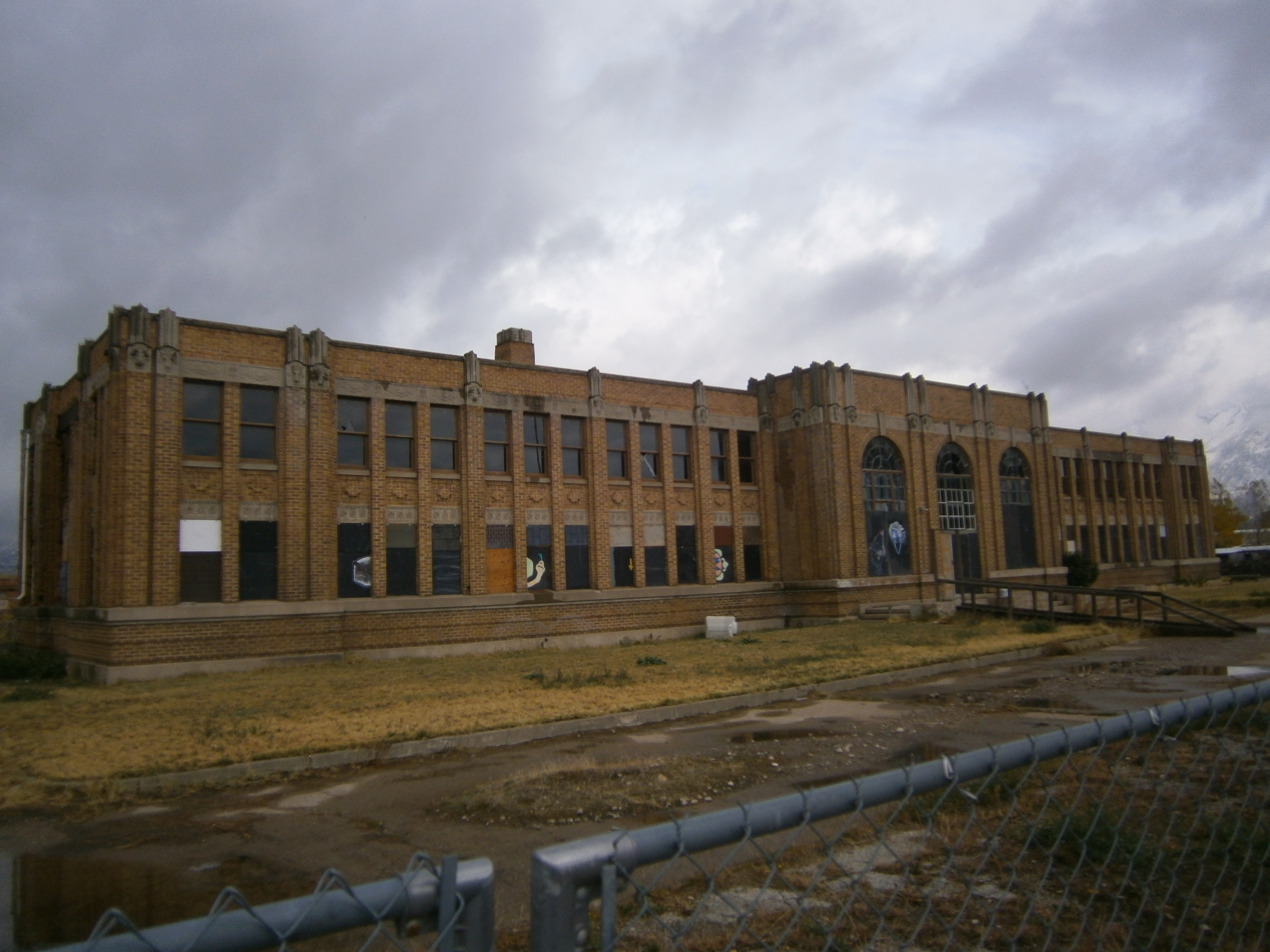
Ogden Union Stockyard Exchange Building (1930)

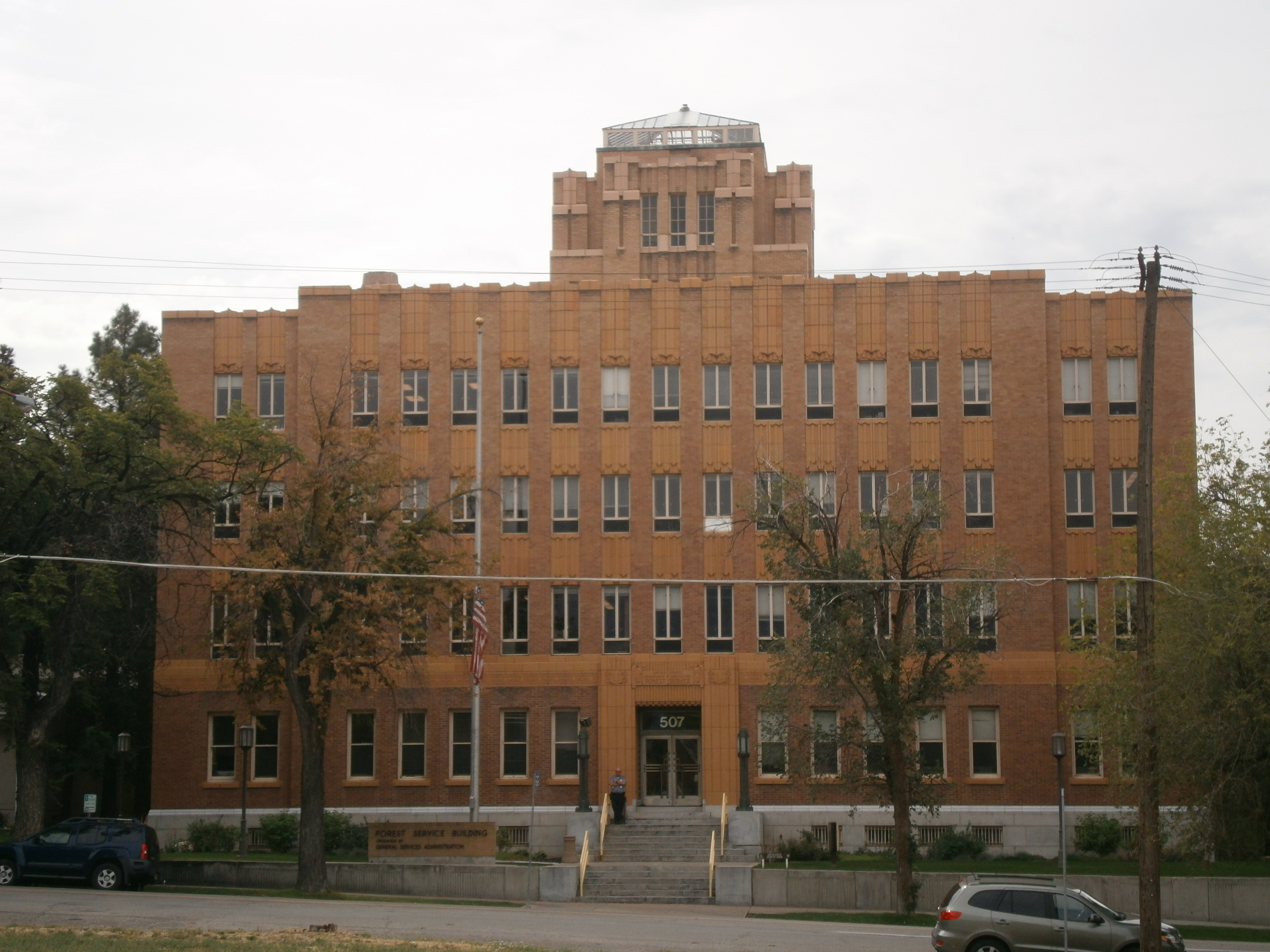
U.S. Forest Service Building (1932)

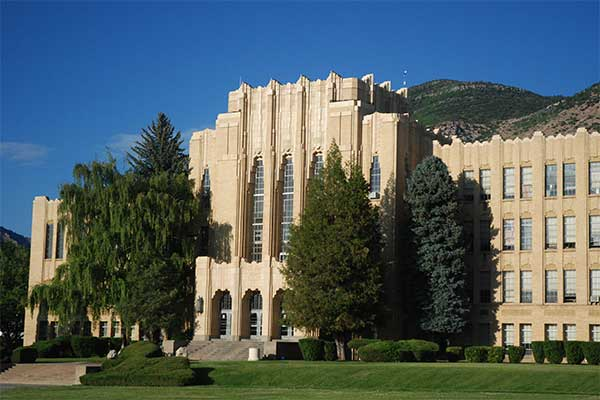
Ogden High School (1936)

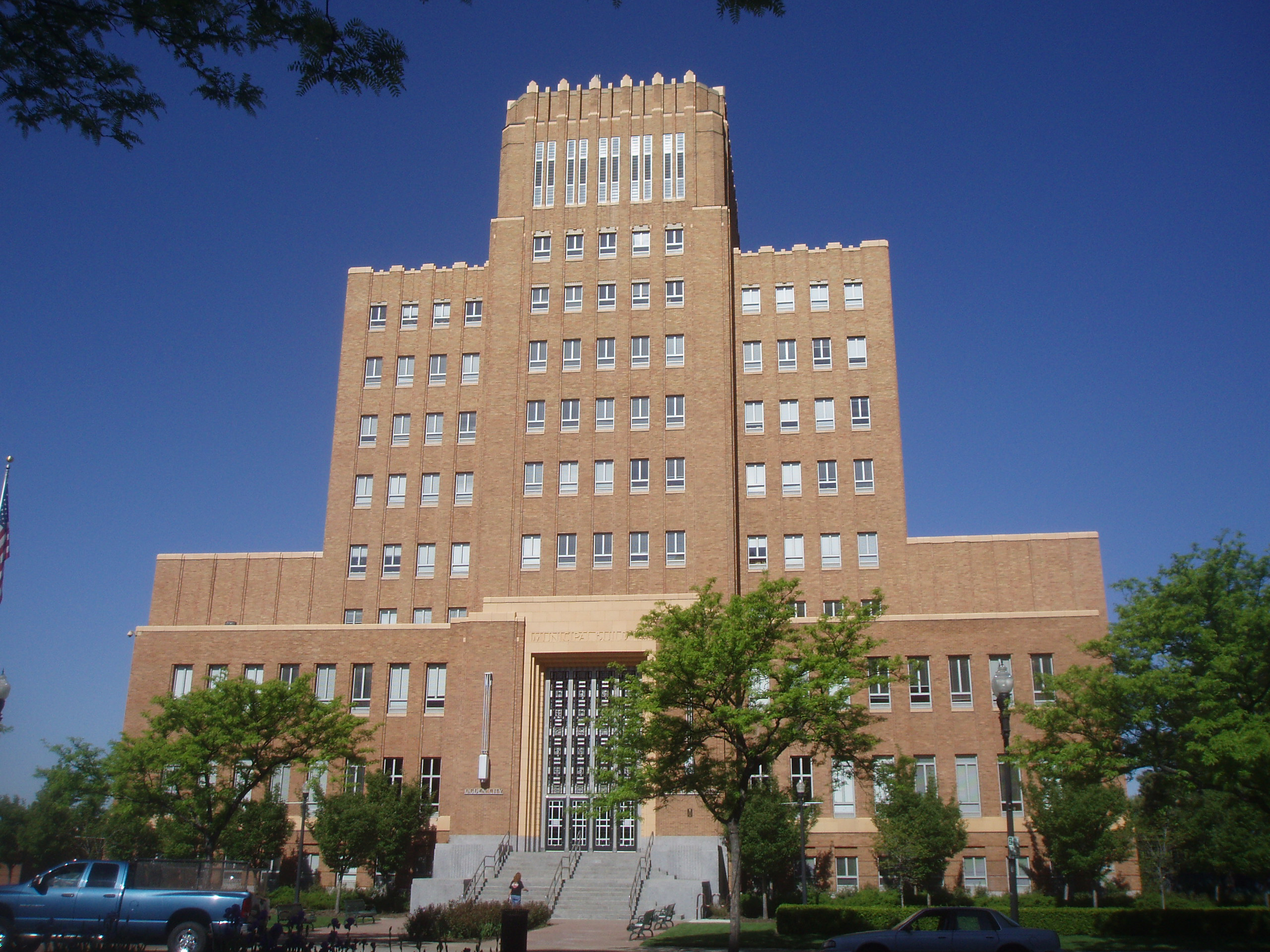
Ogden Municipal Building (1939)

== Other Hodgson-designed buildings ==
- Shupe-Williams Candy Company Factory, 1906, burned down March 11, 2006
- Masonic Temple, 1906
- Ogden 1st Ward Chapel, 1914
- Patterson Building, 1914
- Richardson-Hunt Store, 1915
- Union Stockyard Coliseum, 1926, burned down in 1993
- Union Stockyard Exchange Building, 1930
- Logan Library Building, 1930
- Continental Baking Company, 1947
