= National Register of Historic Places listings in Daggett County, Utah =

Location of Daggett County in Utah

This is a list of the National Register of Historic Places listings in Daggett County, Utah.

This is intended to be a complete list of the properties and districts on the National Register of Historic Places in Daggett County, Utah, United States. Latitude and longitude coordinates are provided for many National Register properties and districts; these locations may be seen together in a map.

There are six properties and districts listed on the National Register in the county.

This National Park Service list is complete through NPS recent listings posted March 21, 2025.

== Current listings ==
	Name on the Register	Image	Date listed	Location	City or town	Description
1	Carter Road		May 21, 2001 (#00000354)	Ashley National Forest; 40°43′11″N 109°43′10″W	Ashley National Forest	1881-built military road in Daggett County and Uintah County
2	John Jarvie Historic Ranch District	John Jarvie Historic Ranch District	January 14, 1986 (#86000232)	Green River and Indian Crossing Bridge east of Dutch John; 40°54′03″N 109°10′32″W	Browns Park	
3	Manila Petroglyphs		October 6, 1975 (#75001802)	Address Restricted	Manila	
4	Dr. John Parsons Cabin Complex	Dr. John Parsons Cabin Complex	November 21, 1976 (#76001812)	Southwest of Bridgeport; 40°51′49″N 109°08′42″W	Bridgeport	
5	Swett Ranch	Swett Ranch	July 10, 1979 (#79002492)	Southwest of Dutch John; 40°52′46″N 109°29′15″W	Greendale	
6	Ute Mountain Fire Tower	Ute Mountain Fire Tower	April 10, 1980 (#80003895)	Southwest of Manila; 40°52′18″N 109°47′31″W	Ashley National Forest	

== See also ==
- List of National Historic Landmarks in Utah
- National Register of Historic Places listings in Utah
