= Irish Canyon Natural Area =

Natural feature in the U.S. state of Colorado

Coordinates: 40°50′22.26″N 108°44′15.68″W

Irish Canyon is a valley in Moffat County in the northwest portion of the U.S. state of Colorado, at 6,099 feet in elevation according to the United States Geological Survey (USGS). The Bureau of Land Management states the elevation in the valley rises from 6,100 to 8,636 feet. It is a scenic and somewhat remote canyon. It is designated both as the Irish Canyon Natural Area and the Irish Canyon Area of Critical Environmental Concern.

== Designated areas ==
Designated as a natural area, Irish Canyon is owned by the United States federal government and is managed by the Bureau of Land Management and the State Land Board. Irish Canyon Natural Area is significant for its geology and plant communities. It has also been designated an Area of Critical Environmental Concern (ACEC) due to its plant species, unique geology, scenery, and cultural resources. The eastern end of the Uinta Mountains has 22 geological formations, 12 of which can be found in Irish Canyon. There are steep canyon walls, no more than 50 yards wide, with green, gray, and red layers.

== History ==
Petroglyphs made by prehistoric peoples are located at the south entrance to the canyon, where there is a short hiking trail. An interpretive exhibit explains the petroglyphs. There are other unmarked archaeological and cultural sites in the canyon. Browns Park was a place of refuge for outlaws like Butch Cassidy, Isom Dart, and Matt Warner at the turn of the 20th century.

== Camping and hiking ==
There are no developed trails, but hiking is available at Cold Spring Mountain and Limestone Ridge to the west and in the badlands along Vermillion Creek and Vermillion Canyon. There are mountain biking areas at Cold Spring Mountain and other areas in the region. Six camping sites, with fire pits and a pit toilet, are located in the north area of the canyon.
