= Old Ladore School =

- Old Lodore School
- U.S. National Register of Historic Places
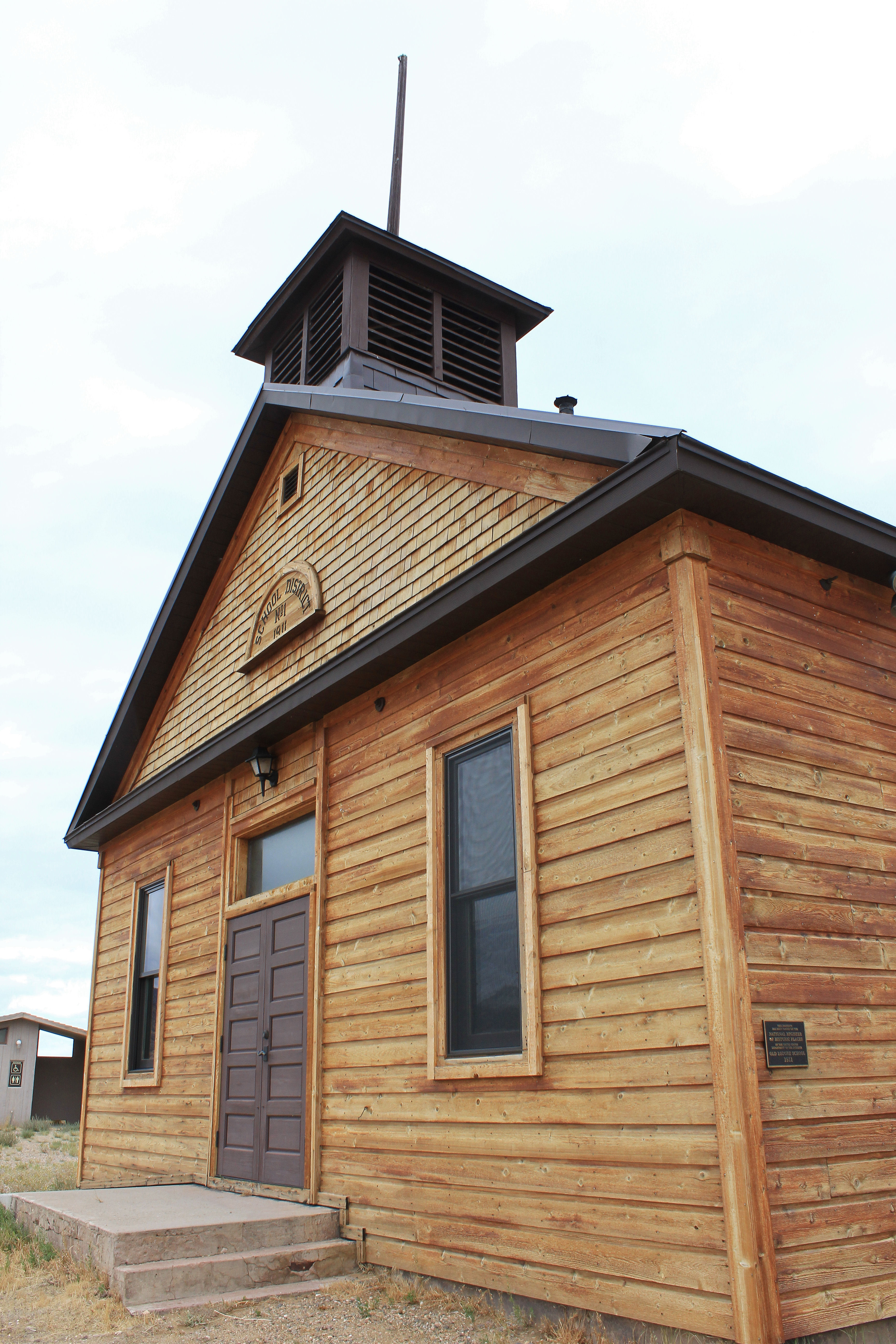

- Location within Colorado
- Location: By Green River on SR 318, Brown's Park, Colorado
- Coordinates: 40°46′48″N 108°53′32″W
- Area: 2 acres (0.81 ha)
- Built: 1911
- Built by: Evers, Hunt & Hoover
- MPS: Rural School Buildings in Colorado MPS
- NRHP reference No.: 75000525
- Added to NRHP: February 24, 1975

The Old Lodore School, which has also been known as the Lodore School, in Brown's Park, Colorado, was built in 1911. It was listed on the National Register of Historic Places in 1975.

It served ranch children in the area of Brown's Hole, "long the famed hide-out for Butch Cassidy and other outlaws of similar status", from 1911 to 1947. The Brown's Park Women's Club took control of the building in 1954 for it to be used as a community center. In 1970 it came under control of the Colorado Fish and Wildlife Resources Development Services, but continued in use as a community center.

It is located by the Green River on State Highway 318. It is about 85 miles (137 km) west of Craig, Colorado, and 5 miles (8.0 km) from the Gates of Lodore.

It is a one-story wooden structure made of horizontal planking, and is 50 by 30 feet (15.2 m × 9.1 m) in plan. It has a cupola-style bell tower, hiding a brick chimney behind it. It was built by carpenters Evers, Hunt & Hoover.

According to the NRHP nomination, about spelling:

The spelling of Lodore or Ladore has resulted from the different references made by local newspapers. The correct spelling is Lodore as given to it by John Wesley Powell in remembrance of the poem "The Gates of Lodore". Newspapers have so long misspelled the name that some still misspell it as Ladore.
