= Browns Park National Wildlife Refuge =

Wildlife preserve in the U.S. state of Colorado

- IUCN category IV (habitat/species management area)
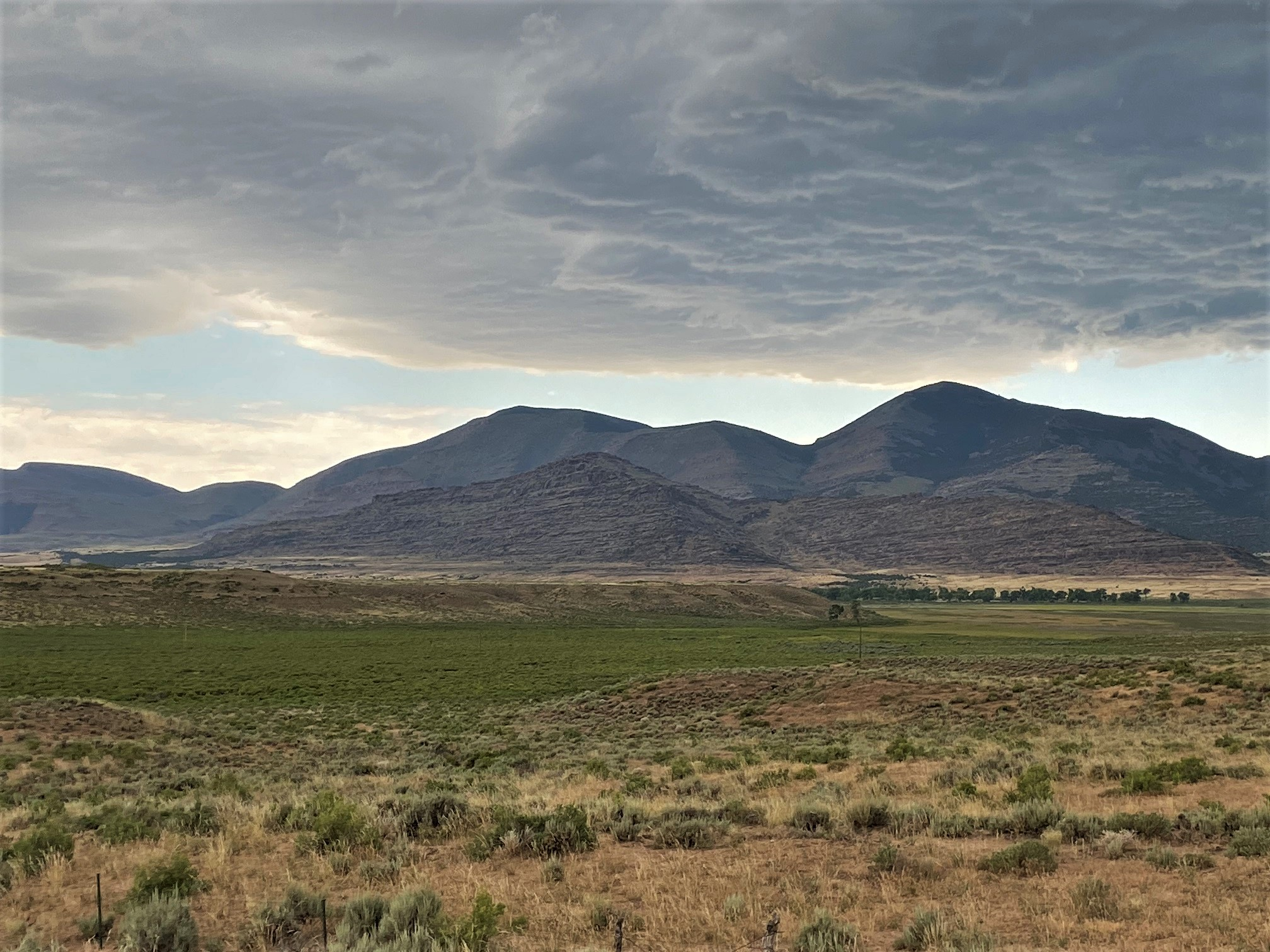

- Location within the United States Location within Colorado
- Location: Moffat County, Colorado, United States
- Nearest city: Craig
- Coordinates: 40°49′30″N 108°57′0″W
- Area: 13,450 acres (54.4 km^{2})
- Established: 1965
- Governing body: U.S. Fish and Wildlife Service
- Website: www.fws.gov/refuge/browns_park/

Browns Park National Wildlife Refuge is a 13,450-acre (5,440 ha) U.S. National Wildlife Refuge located in northwestern Colorado. It is located in Moffat County in the extreme northwestern corner of the state, in an isolated mountain valley of Browns Park on both sides of the Green River, approximately 25 miles (40 km) below Flaming Gorge Dam. Established in 1965, the refuge is managed by the United States Fish and Wildlife Service office in Maybell, Colorado. The refuge is approximately 53 miles (85 km) northwest of Maybell on State Highway 318. The refuge consists of bottomland and adjacent benchland. The western border of the refuge is the Colorado-Utah state line. The refuge is surrounded by adjacent lines of the Bureau of Land Management. The refuge contains the site of the former Fort Davy Crockett that was constructed in 1837 to protect trappers against attacks by Blackfoot Native Americans.

== Description ==
The acquisition of the refuge lands was approved by the Migratory Bird Conservation Commission on August 20, 1963 in order to develop and manage waterfowl habitat in that portion of Browns Park within the state of Colorado. The private land was purchased with funds from the Migratory Bird Hunting Stamp Act. The first tract of private land was acquired on July 13, 1965. As of 2005, 5,356 acres (2,167 ha) have been purchased at a cost of $622,976, 6,794 acres (2,749 ha) have been withdrawn from public domain lands, and 1,305 acres (528 ha) are leased from the state of Colorado (state school sections). There is one private inholding on the refuge, a 200-acre (81 ha) tract of grassland and cottonwood groves located at the southeast end of the refuge.

The primary purpose of the refuge is to provide high quality nesting and migration habitat for the Great Basin Canada goose, ducks and other migratory birds. Before the construction of Flaming Gorge Dam in 1962, the Green River flooded annually, creating excellent waterfowl nesting, feeding and resting marshes in the backwater sloughs and old stream meanders. The dam stopped the flooding, eliminating much of this waterfowl habitat. Pumping from the Green River, along with water diverted from Beaver and Vermillion Creeks, now maintains nine marsh units comprising approximately 1,430 acres (580 ha). The river covers approximately 1,000 acres (400 ha) along with sedimentary river bottomlands. Well vegetated grasslands interspersed with cottonwood, willows, salt cedar, greasewood and sage cover approximately 5,000 acres (2,000 ha). The remainder of the refuge (6,000 acres or 2,400 hectares) is alluvial benchlands and steep rocky mountain slopes. Elevations vary from 5,355 to 6,200 feet (1,632 to 1,890 m) above sea level.

The refuge is home to approximately 200 species of birds at various times of the year. Nesting birds in the refuge include mallards, redheads, teal, canvasbacks, other ducks, and Canada geese. About 300 goslings and 2,500 ducklings hatch there annually. The waterfowl population typically swells by thousands during the spring and fall migrations. Bald eagles frequent the refuge during the winter. Golden eagles and peregrine falcons are seen soaring over the refuge during spring and summer. Bird watching is available at several locations in habitats ranging from semi-arid sage brush to lush wetlands and cottonwood stands adjacent to the Green River.

The refuge is also home to mammal species such as deer, elk, pronghorn, and an occasional bighorn sheep, especially during moderate or severe winters. Moose are found in the wet, riparian areas during the spring, summer and fall. Deer and elk are commonly seen anywhere on the refuge during moderate to severe winters. River otter use the Green River and refuge wetlands year round.

== See also ==
- Browns Park
- Cold Spring Mountain
- List of National Wildlife Refuges
