= Fort Misery =

Fort Misery may refer to:

- Fort Misery, Arizona, a populated place in Arizona
- Fort Misery, the oldest log cabin in Arizona, now on the grounds of the Sharlot Hall Museum
- Fort Misery (Colorado) was another name for Fort Davy Crockett, a 19th-century trading post in Colorado
