= Matt Warner =

American rancher and farmer (1864–1938)

- Born: Erastus Christiansen, some say he was born Willard Erastus Christiansen (Note: In public records, such as census and marriage records, he was known as Erastus Christiansen, (Note: In 1870, Erastus Christiansen, born about 1864, lived with Christian and Christina, who were both from Denmark. His older siblings were Niels, Christina, and Anthony. They lived in Levan, Juan, Utah.) and some sources use Willard Erastus Christiansen. In written works about him, his surname is often spelled Christianson. His most prevalent alias was Matt Warner. He was also called "Ras Lewis" and "The Mormon Kid".); April 12, 1864; Ephraim, Utah
- Died: December 21, 1938 (aged 74); Price, Carbon County, Utah, US
- Resting place: Price City Cemetery; 39°36'30.7"N 110°47'55.5"W
- Other names: Matt Warner, Ras Lewis, The Mormon Kid
- Occupations: Farmer, cowboy, rancher, ferryman, rustler, bank robber, justice of the peace, lawman, bootlegger

Matt Warner (April 12, 1864 – December 21, 1938) was a notable figure from the American Old West who was a farmer, cowboy, rancher, ferryman, cattle rustler, bank robber, justice of the peace, lawman, and bootlegger. Born Erastus Christiansen, he changed his name in his teens when he became an outlaw.

Warner operated in the Robbers Roost area of southeastern Utah before teaming up with outlaw Butch Cassidy. While on the run from the law, he married Rose Morgan. For a while he operated a cattle ranch in Washington's Big Bend Country. Later he operated a ranch on Diamond Mountain in Uintah County, Utah, using the registered brand of Quarter Circle Bar Quarter Circle, commonly called the Horse Bit brand. He co-wrote The Last of the Bandit Riders, a memoir.

== Early life ==
Erastus Christiansen was born on April 12, 1864, in Ephraim, Sanpete County, Utah. Both of his parents, Christian and Christina Christiansen, were from Denmark. His father was a farmer and a Mormon bishop, Christina being, by some accounts, his fifth wife. (Note: Kelly states that his mother was the youngest wife and from Germany. Christian's obituary said that he had two wives.) Christian converted to the Church of Jesus Christ of Latter-day Saints in Denmark and his son, John, was the first child born into the faith there. He came to the United States and lived in Utah in the early 1850s. He was a missionary and a preacher in the United States and for two years in Denmark. The Christiansens lived in several towns (Nephi, Ephraim, Levan, and Manti, Utah), depending upon his roles within the church. He became the Bishop of Levan, and had eight children, including Ezra and Oliver.

Teeny, Warner's sister, married Tom McCarty, the leader of the Blue Mountain Gang. The Christiansens lived on the frontier, where their neighbors included cattle rustlers and horse thieves. When Warner was thirteen or fourteen years old, he got into a fight with another young man over a girl. Thinking that he had killed him, Warner ran away from home.

== Outlaw ==
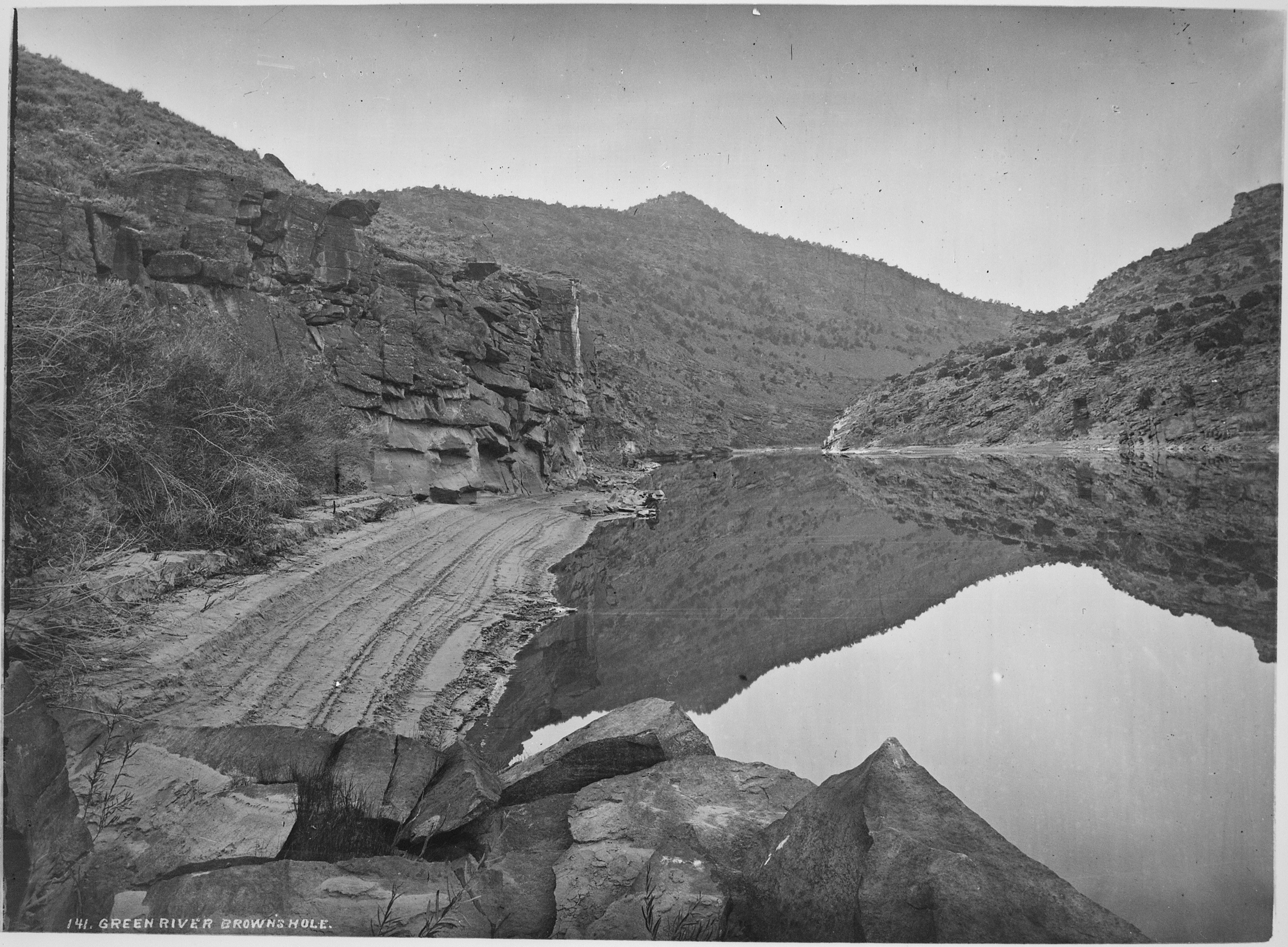
William Henry Jackson, Green River at Brown's Hole. Daggett County, Utah, 1870

In 1878, Warner went to the eastern Uinta Mountains, where cattle grazed on the range and farmers irrigated their crops on remote homesteads. There were some small settlements, but no churches or towns, and very little law enforcement.

=== Browns Park ===
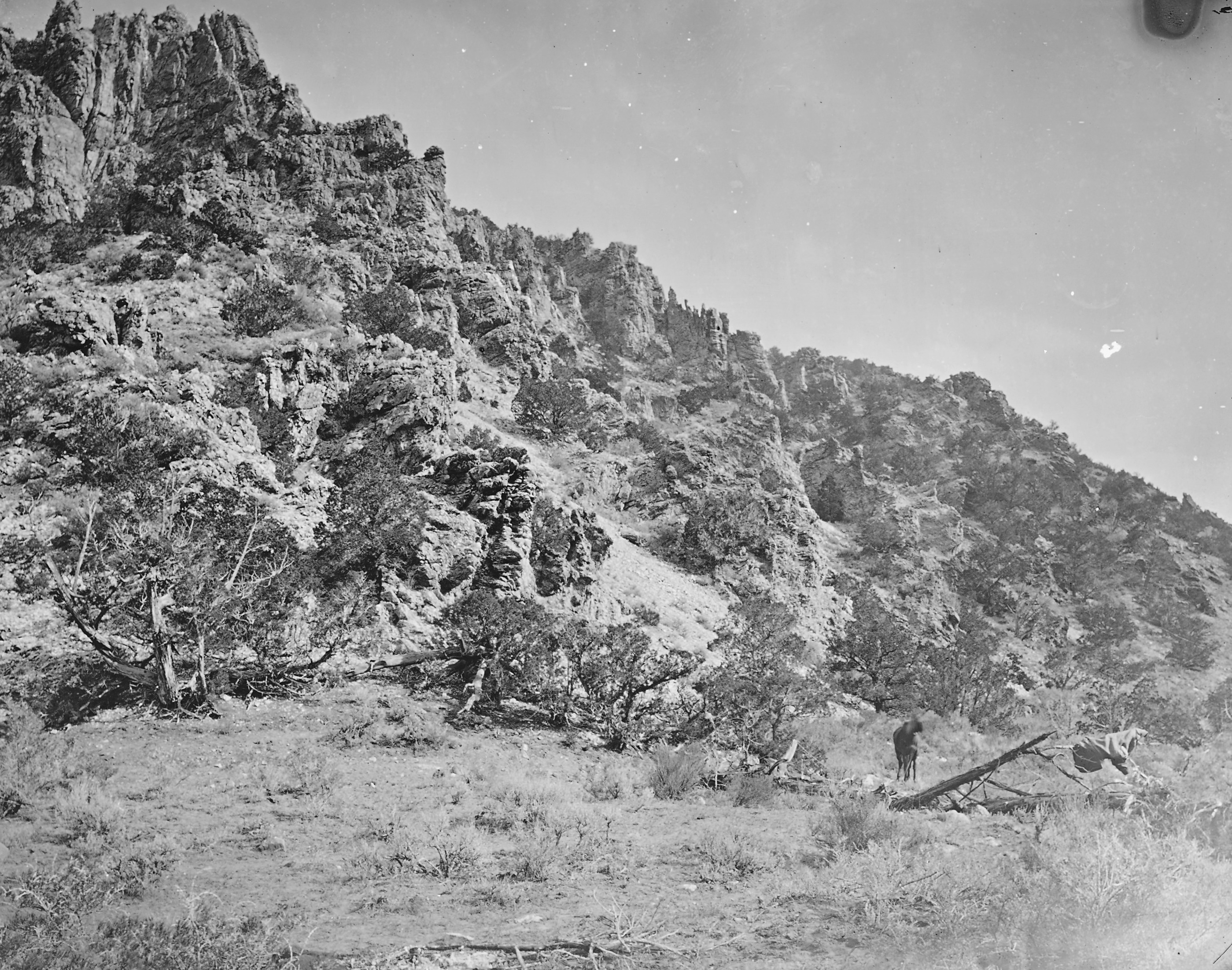
William Henry Jackson, A bluff of quartzite, near the mouth of Red Creek, in Brown's Hole. Daggett County, Utah, 1870, Collection National Archives at College Park

He shot a Mexican horse thief during a gunfight; he was 15. At the same age, he started working for a rancher Jim Warren at Diamond Mountain, Utah. He received some of the cattle that he had rustled with Warren, enough to start his own cattle ranch on Diamond Mountain.

He joined a crew of cowboys trailing a herd of horses into the Uinta Basin of northeastern Utah. There he soon joined up with cattle rustlers working out of Browns Park, earning the name of the "Mormon Kid".

Along with other outlaws and "colorful figures" that worked for him as a freighter or ferry operator, Warner occasionally worked on John Jarvie's ferry that crossed the Green River in Browns Park (also called Brown's Hole). Warner had 124 horses by October 16, 1886, when he mortgaged them. He agreed to receive $847.90 (equivalent to $30,383 in 2025) and repay the balance with 12% annual interest by April 16, 1887.

Warner was one of the "Last of the Bandit Riders", whose initiation to crime began with John Jarvie. Hearing from his pal Elza Lay that a Jewish merchant was evading the sheriff who intended to attach the goods he was transporting through Browns Park, Warner decided to hold up the merchant and take the goods. They were mostly clothes. The merchant was not in a position to complain to law enforcement. Warner arranged a masquerade dance and asked party-goers to obtain "hot" clothes at Jarvie's store to attend the party. "Every last man, woman, child, and dog in the valley . . . come to the dance dressed in them cheap, misfitting clothes." (Note: Matt Warner said of the night: "It was the funniest sight I ever saw in my life . . . most of the people persisted in hanging onto parts of their old cowboy and rancher outfits and mixing up clothes dreadfully. The way store clothes and cowboy clothes, celluloid collars and red bandanna handkerchiefs, old busted ten-gallon range hats and cheap derbies, high-heel boots and brogans, Prince Albert coats and chaps, and spurs and guns was mixed up would give you the willies. One old weather-beaten rancher was dressed like a minister, except he had his gun belt and gun on the outside of his long black coat. A cowboy was dressed like a gambler with a bright green vest and high hat, but persisted in wearing his leather chaps, high-heel boots, and spurs. A weather-beaten ranch woman, with a tanned face, and hands like a ditch digger, had on a bridal veil and dress with a long train. A big cowgirl come with a hat on that looked like a flower garden, a cheap gingham dress, and brogans.")

After around 1889, Warner gave up his attempt to live a lawful family life. He was a member of the Robber's Roost Gang, with Butch Cassidy, Elzy Lay, Bill Tibbets, Jim Peterson, and his brother-in-law, Tom McCarty.

=== Gunfights ===
In 1892, Warner, Bill McCarty and Tom McCarty robbed a bank in Roslyn, Washington. When some bystanders attempted to stop them, two men were shot and wounded. Later in 1892 Warner was jailed in Ellensburg, Washington, for this robbery. He and his cellmate George McCarty broke out two days before his trial. He shot and wounded one person, but was later exonerated of all charges.

In 1896, in the Uinta Mountains north of Vernal, Utah, Warner was involved in a gunfight where he shot and killed two men and wounded a third. Warner insisted it was self-defense. He was tried for murder, convicted of manslaughter, and sentenced to prison for five years. He was released after serving three years and four months. Governor Wells of Utah then issued him a pardon on his promise to go straight.

== Justice of the peace and lawman ==
In his later years, Warner ran for public office as Willard Erastus Christiansen, and lost because he was unknown by this name. He then officially changed his name to Matt Warner, the name most people knew him by. He was elected justice of the peace and then served as a deputy sheriff. He was a particularly good sheriff because he was a good shot and knew how to catch outlaws. In his later years, he worked as a night guard and detective in Price, Utah. He wrote a memoir, The Last of the Bandit Riders.

== Personal life ==
Warner married and had children from the age of 25. He lived an honest life for a time. Soon after he started his prison sentence, his wife died. He was a widower living with his father and working as a bartender in 1900. Later on he remarried and settled in Carbon County, Utah.

As a young man, he had a "combustible temper". He was known as honest and fair: "he would rather die than tell a lie." He died a natural death on December 21, 1938, at 74.

== Legacy and popular culture ==
- Matt Warner Reservoir, Uintah County, Utah
- Stone monument in his name in front of the Carbon County Courthouse.
- Warner was portrayed in Tenting Tonight on the Old Camp Ground (1943 American Western film) and Thunder Town (1946 American Western film)
- Arthur Franz appeared as Warner on the TV western Death Valley Days on the 1960 episode titled "The Devil's Due."

== Books ==
- The Last of the Bandit Riders. By Matt Warner as told to Murray E. King. Caldwell, ID: Caxton, 1940.
  - Reprint. New York: Bonanza Books, 1946. OCLC 2588710.
- The Last of the Bandit Riders ... Revisited. By Matt Warner as told to Murray E. King; revisited by Joyce Warner, Steve Lacy. Salt Lake City, UT: Big Moon Traders, 2000. ISBN 9780965669412.
