= Fort Davy Crockett =

- White-Indian Contact Site also known as Fort Davy Crockett
- U.S. National Register of Historic Places
- Colorado State Register of Historic Properties No. 5MF605
- Location within Colorado Location within the United States
- Location: Browns Park National Wildlife Refuge, Moffat County, Colorado
- Coordinates: 40°47′10.25″N 108°53′39.83″W
- NRHP reference No.: 77001561
- Added to NRHP: March 8, 1977

Fort Davy Crockett, also called Fort Misery, was a trading post of the late 1830s and early 1840s. The site is located within Browns Park National Wildlife Refuge in Moffat County, Colorado. Unlike most trading posts within the confines of the current state of Colorado, Fort Davy Crockett was located west of the Rocky Mountains in what is now northwestern Colorado. (Note: It is described as being on the Green River and Vermillion Creek in the Brown's Hole area. It is also described as being off of Highway 318 and about one mile northwest of Ladore School, also known as Ladore Hall (40.7802399,-108.8950827). Green River has changed its course over the years, making finding the exact location difficult.)

A site listed on the National Register of Historic Places as White-Indian Contact Site, is apparently this Fort Davy Crockett. It is historically significant due to the contact of European Americans and Native Americans when the trading post was established in the 1830s. Brown's Hole continued to be a rendezvous point for fur trappers and traders when the fort was abandoned.

== Fort and trading post ==
The trading post was established between 1832 and 1837 by Phillip Thompson, Prewitt Sinclair, and William Craig. Made of adobe and cottonwood, it was described as a "hollow square of one story cabins, with roofs and floors of mud... Around these were found conical skin lodges of the squaws of the white trappers, who were away on their fall hunt. Here also were the lodges of Mr. Robinson, a trader." Due to "deplorable living conditions", some trappers called it Fort Misery or Fort de Misère. Kit Carson and other mountain men stayed at the trading post, which served many purposes. It was a place to trade furs for money or supplies, a social center, a tavern, and a lodge.

External image
- Fort Davy Crockett Historical marker

By the winter of 1839, however, inhabitants were starving and resorted to purchasing dogs from Native Americans for meat. This was verified following an archaeological survey that found dog bones at the site. After a reduced demand for beaver fur, the trading post was abandoned by 1844. A historical marker is located at Lodore School, or Lodore Hall, in the wildlife refuge.
