= Dr. John Parsons Cabin Complex =

- U.S. National Register of Historic Places
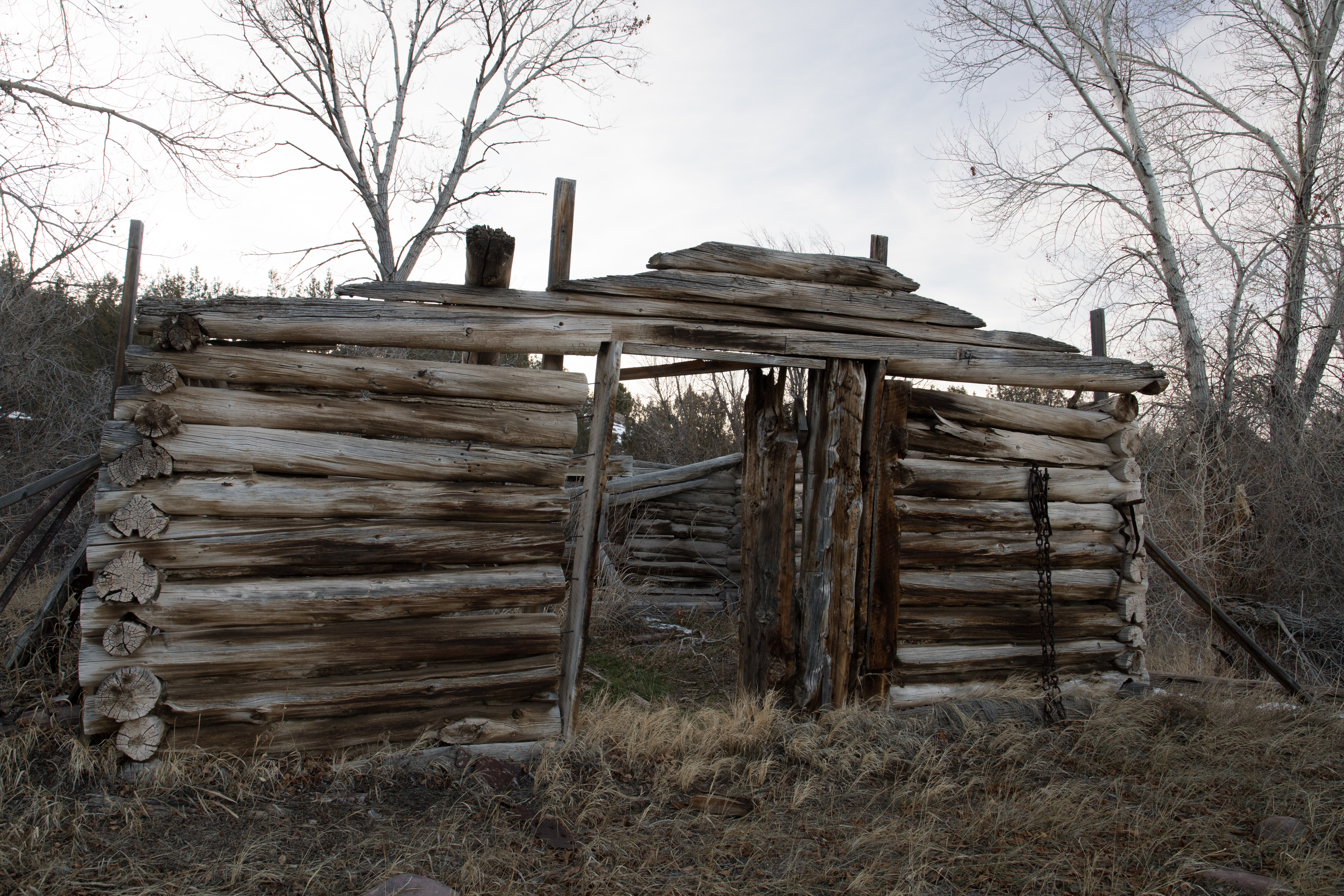

- Location within Utah Location within the United States
- Nearest city: Bridgeport, Utah
- Coordinates: 40°51′49″N 109°08′42″W
- Area: 2.5 acres (1.0 ha)
- Built: 1874
- Built by: Dr. John D. Parsons
- NRHP reference No.: 76001812
- Added to NRHP: November 21, 1976

The Dr. John Parsons Cabin Complex is a historic pioneer settlement on the Green River in the Browns Park region of Daggett County, Utah. Dr. John D. Parsons, a rancher and physician from Denver, settled at the site between 1874 and 1876. Parsons built a log cabin for his family at the site; he later added a springhouse, blacksmith shop, and bunkhouse on the property. Travelers between Vernal, Utah and Wyoming frequently stopped at the bunkhouse for the night. Parsons died in 1881, and his family left the cabin in 1884. The abandoned cabin later became a hideout for outlaws passing through the region, including Butch Cassidy and Matt Warner.

The complex was added to the National Register of Historic Places on November 21, 1976.
