= Vermillion Creek =

Creek in Wyoming and Colorado

Physical characteristics
- Source
  - location: Confluence of North Fork Vermillion Creek and Coyote Creek
  - coordinates: 41°05′20″N 108°47′22″W
- Mouth
  - location: Confluence with Green River
  - coordinates: 40°45′44″N 106°53′12″W
  - elevation: 5,338 ft (1,627 m)

Basin features
- Progression: Green—Colorado

Vermillion Creek is a 67.5-mile-long (108.6 km) tributary of the Green River. It flows south from Sweetwater County, Wyoming to a confluence with the Green River just north of the Gates of Lodore in Moffat County, Colorado.

== See also ==
- List of rivers of Colorado
- List of tributaries of the Colorado River
