= Lodore Falls =

Waterfall in England

Coordinates: 54.5576°N 3.1378°W

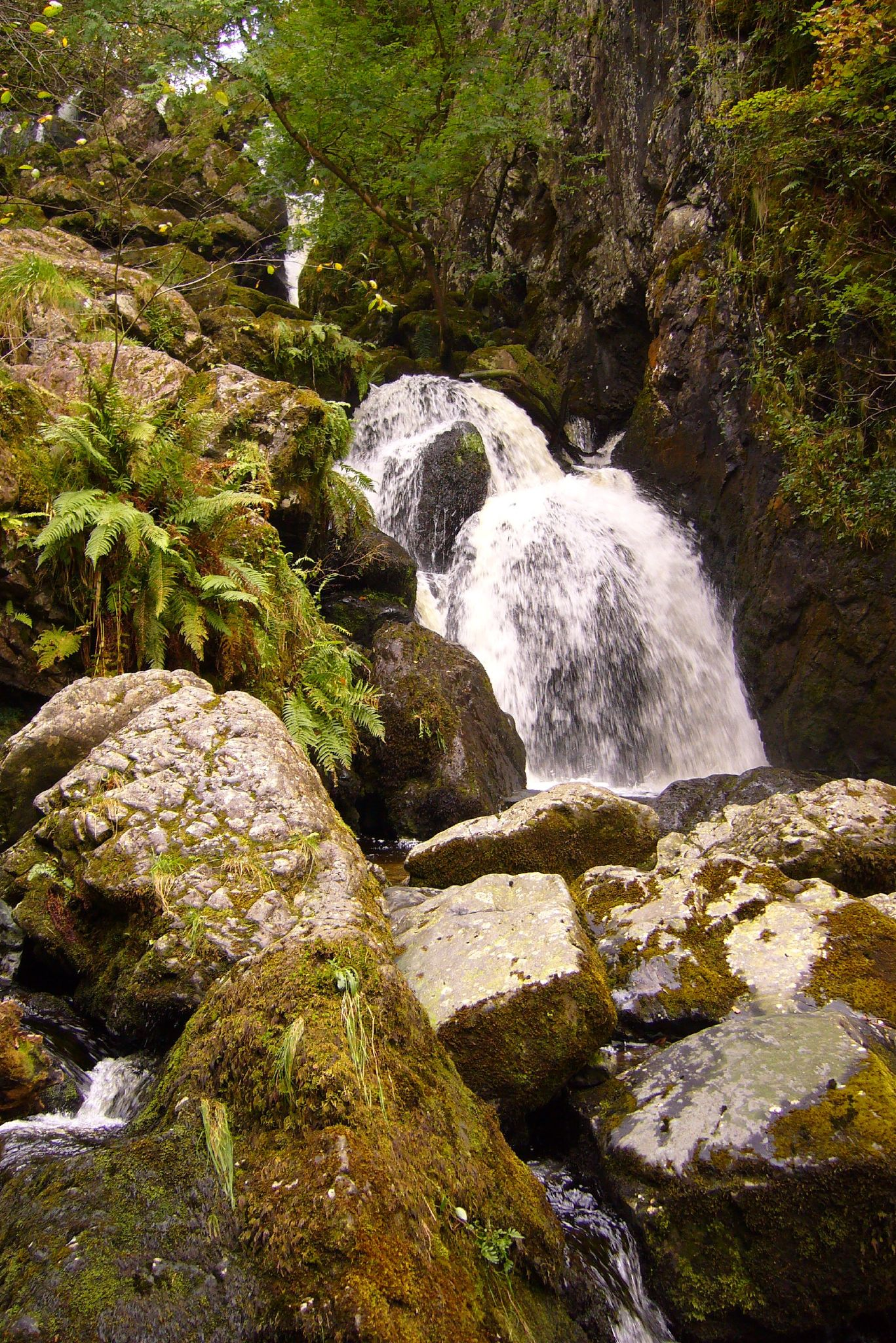
A close up view of the falls

Lodore Falls is a waterfall in Cumbria, England, close to Derwentwater and downstream from Watendlath. The falls are located on the beck that flows from Watendlath Tarn, and tumble more than 100 feet (30 m) over a steep cascade into the Borrowdale Valley. It is spectacular after heavy rain, but it may reduce to a trickle if there is a long period of dry weather.

== History ==
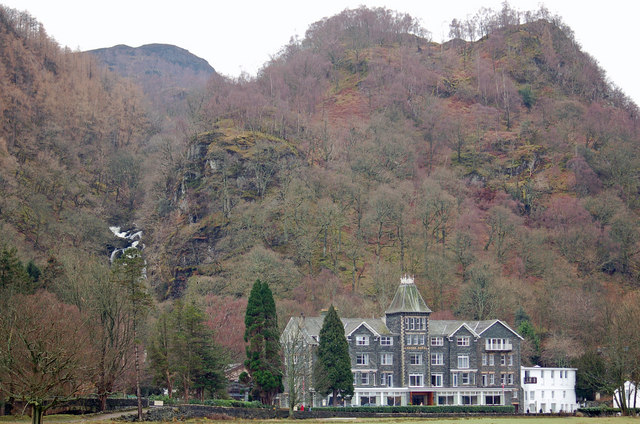
The Lodore Falls Hotel with the falls behind it

There are theories that the falls are the Rhaeadr Derwennydd (Derwennydd Falls) mentioned in the Welsh lullaby "Dinogad's Smock", preserved as an interpolation in the epic poem Y Gododdin, written between the 7th and 11th centuries.

One of the other earliest recorded visits to the "Lodoar Falls" was by William Sawrey Gilpin in 1772, and he describes them as follows: "The stream falls through a chasm between two towering perpendicular rocks. The intermediate part, broken into large fragments, forms the rough bed of the cascade. Some of these fragments stretching out in shelves, hold a depth of soil sufficient for large trees. Among these broken rocks the stream finds its way through a fall of at least a hundred feet; and in heavy rains, the water is every way suited to the grandeur of the scene." Gilpin referred to the rivulet as the "Lodoar River".

By the time of Joseph Budworth's tour of the local area in 1792, a public house had been built in front of the falls. A famous onomatopoeic poem, "Cataract of Lodore", written by Robert Southey in 1820, was inspired by the falls, and he seems to have fixed the spelling of the name.

The public house was enlarged to become the Lodore Hotel in 1870. The hotel was bought by Robert England and his Swiss wife, Merthie Muggler, becoming the Swiss Lodore Hotel in 1947. The hotel was acquired by Stakis Hotels in 1987, by Hilton Hotels (on their acquisition of Stakis Hotels) in 1999 and by the Graves family, who renamed it the Lodore Falls Hotel, in 2004. The falls are on private land which can be directly accessed by hotel patrons or accessed by the general public via a roadside path. The oak woodlands are a Site of Special Scientific Interest (SSSI).

== See also ==
- List of waterfalls
- List of waterfalls in England

== Sources ==
- Gilpin, William (1786). Observations relative chiefly to Picturesque Beauty made in the year 1772, On Several Parts of England; Particularly the Mountains, and Lakes of Cumberland, and Westmorland. London : R. Blamire.
