= Isam Dart =

American rancher (1849–1900)

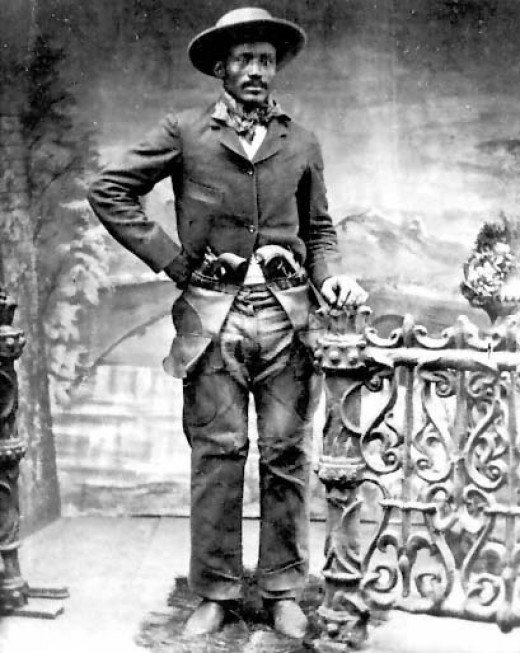
Isom Dart, with two guns in his belt.

Isam Dart (1858–October 3, 1900), also known as Isom, (Note: His name is spelled numerous ways, such as Isham and Isom.) was a cattle driver, rancher, and horse and cattle rustler during the late 19th century in the Wild West. He settled in Browns Park in northwestern Colorado, where he was considered by his neighbors to be a "superlative rider and roper, a good neighbor, and an expert and industrious cattle thief." He and his partner Madison Matthew Rash were gunned down in separate events and were believed to have been assassinated by Tom Horn, a hired gunman.

In one Butch Cassidy biography, published in 1927 and updated in 1959, a detailed six-page account of Dart's life is offered in the author's broader description of the Brown's Hole area of Colorado, Utah, and Wyoming. This account states that Dart, a man of many aliases including the nickname Quick Shot, was born a slave in the Ozarks with the name Ned Huddleston.

== Early years ==
According to the Museum of Northwest Colorado, Dart was born in Texas about 1858. (Note: His name was spelled Isham in the 1870 Federal Census.) His father was Cyrus (also Silas) Dart, a farmer in Seguin, Texas. (Note: According to the Museum of Northwest Colorado, much of what is known about Isam Dart has been erroneous. Dart was not Ned Huddleston and was not born into slavery in Arkansas.) He had a sister and two brothers. The family lived amongst a diverse community of Hispanics, Native Americans, Blacks, and Whites. He began earning money wrangling cattle in his teens, when he rounded up wild cattle. He worked at the Goodnight Ranch. He stole horses with a man named Terresa.

== Wyoming and Browns Park ==
In 1881, Dart was one of a group of men who drove cattle north to Wyoming Territory. He worked on a large ranch there, wrangling horses. He worked as a cook at a railroad construction camp between Green River and Rock Springs of the Wyoming Territory.

In 1883, Dart was a member of a cattle drive to the Browns Park area in northwestern Colorado, near the borders with Wyoming and Utah. He worked for Herb and Elizabeth Bassett in Browns Park. The couple had five children, including Josie and Ann Bassett, who became famous. Due to the lack of law enforcement, the area attracted outlaws, like Butch Cassidy and the Wild Bunch, which meant that ranchers were reluctant to take full use of the open range land.

While working for the Bassetts, Dart was a ranch hand who also cooked meals, washed laundry, cut wood, and performed other household duties. Elizabeth Bassett was believed to be the mastermind of a group of cattle thieves, a group that included Dart. Dart was fond of children and babysat the children of Josie Bassett and her husband Jim McKnight. He played the harmonica and fiddle. Dart sang for the children, put on shows for them, and taught them how to ride and rope.

Dart was accomplished and considered a skilled bronco buster and a "top hand among cowboys". Joe Davenport, his friend, stated in 1929 that "I have seen all the great riders. But for all-around skill as a cowman, Isam Dart was unexcelled and I never saw his peer". Although it was common for African Americans to be subjected to hostility at that time, he was well-respected. He and Madison (Matt) Rash ran their own cattle operations and were accused of rustling cattle.

He was known as a notorious outlaw, but he was never convicted. In one case, Dart was said to have been arrested by a deputy sheriff, who drove the two men in a buckboard wagon and headed for jail. The wagon slipped off the side of a mountain and the deputy was injured. Dart rescued the deputy, gave him first aid, and then surrendered to the sheriff. The deputy was a character witness for Dart in his trial. As the result of his testimony, Dart was acquitted of his crime.

In addition to being a cattle rancher and rustler, Dart captured, broke in, and sold wild horses that were branded with "I D Bar". J.S. Hoy, a cattle rancher, intended to remove small ranchers from the area. His ranch was burned down and Dart and two other men were charged with the crime. Dart was taken to a jail north of Steamboat Springs on Hahns Peak, where he awaited the start of the trial for arson in 1890. He escaped from the jail, laid low in Denver for some time, and returned to Browns Park in 1894. He was not tried for arson.

In 1898, Dart was a member of a posse that tracked down men who had killed a teenager, Willie Strang, in Browns Park. They cornered the men on a rocky hillside where Harry Tracy killed Valentine Hoy.

== Colorado Range War ==
The Colorado Range War began by 1899 when large ranchers hired Tom Horn, a stock detective and former Pinkerton detective. His arrangement included a $500 payment (equivalent to $19,350 in 2025) for each rustler that was killed. The money came from the stockmen's association dues. Horn assumed the persona of a horse buyer to gain evidence of rustlers, which was found to include Dart. Dart lived near Cold Spring Mountain's summit near Browns Park. After Matt Rash was killed on July 8, 1900, Dart invited his friends—including Sam and George Bassett—to stay at his cabin, which he assumed would be safe. On October 3, 1900, Dart was shot and killed instantly as he walked from his cabin to his corral. The Bassetts heard the gunshot, but saw no sign of the shooter. Eb Bassett removed leather wrist cuffs from Dart's body before he was buried. (Note: The cuffs were passed down through Bassett's family and then were acquired by the Museum of Northwest Colorado.) Dart was buried near his cabin. By the time of his death, Dart and his partner Matt Rash were said to have amassed two good ranches and a lot of cattle and horses.

An impaneled jury found that "Isam Dart came to his death, by a rifle shot at the hands of a party unknown". Tom Horn was charged in 1902 with killing a fourteen-year-old boy, Willie Nickels, the son of the rancher Kels P. Nickels, in July 1901. Journalists suspected Horn of killing Dart and Rash.

== Erroneous historical information ==
According to the Museum of Northwest Colorado and others, much of what is known about Isam Dart has been erroneous. Dart was not Ned Huddleston and was not born into slavery in Arkansas.

The museum states:

Isam Dart is a fascinating character in US history. Unfortunately, he is best known for untrue tales and for being murdered by the West’s most famous hitman – Tom Horn. There are countless stories about Isam Dart growing up as a slave in Arkansas. After being freed, the story goes, he ran with the vicious Tip Gault Gang under the alias Ned Huddleston. However, nearly all of this is pure fiction – including the very existence of a “Tip Gault Gang”.

The erroneous information about Dart began with W.G. Tittsworth's book "Outskirt Episodes" that was published in 1927 and subsequent books repeated the story. One modern author said that Tittsworth's book was at least two-thirds fiction. As an example, there are no public records for Ned Huddleston and researchers found that no one who knew Dart knew of Huddleston.

== Popular culture ==
- He was portrayed by Danny Glover in Hannah's Law (2012 film).
- Louis Gossett Jr. played the role of Isom Picket, which was a fictional character based upon Bill Picket and Isam Dart, in the Return to Lonesome Dove (1993 television film).

== See also ==
- Dr. John Parsons Cabin Complex
- History of slavery in Colorado
- List of African American pioneers of Colorado
- Bill Pickett
- Bose Ikard
- Nat Love
