= Ute Mountain Fire Tower =

- U.S. National Register of Historic Places
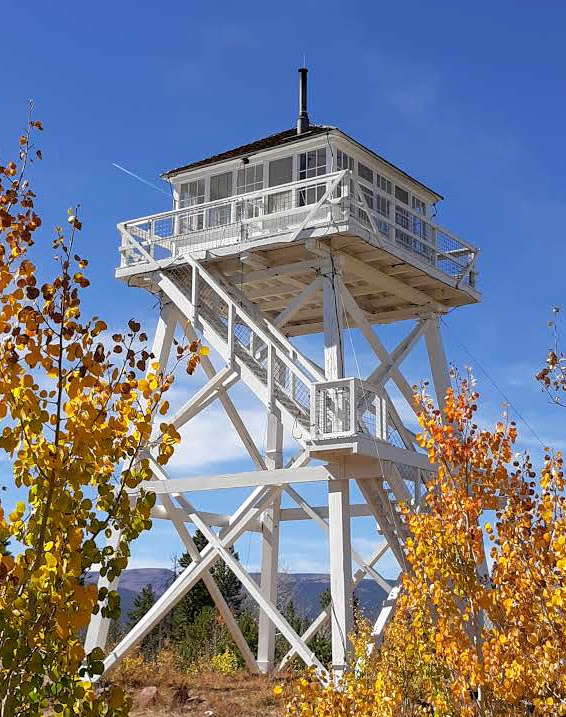
- Ute Mountain Fire Tower, September 2018

- Location within Utah Location within the United States
- Location: Daggett County, Utah; United States
- Nearest city: Manila
- Coordinates: 40°52′18″N 109°47′31″W
- Area: 1 acre (0.40 ha)
- Built: 1937
- Architect: Civilian Conservation Corps
- NRHP reference No.: 80003895
- Added to NRHP: April 10, 1980

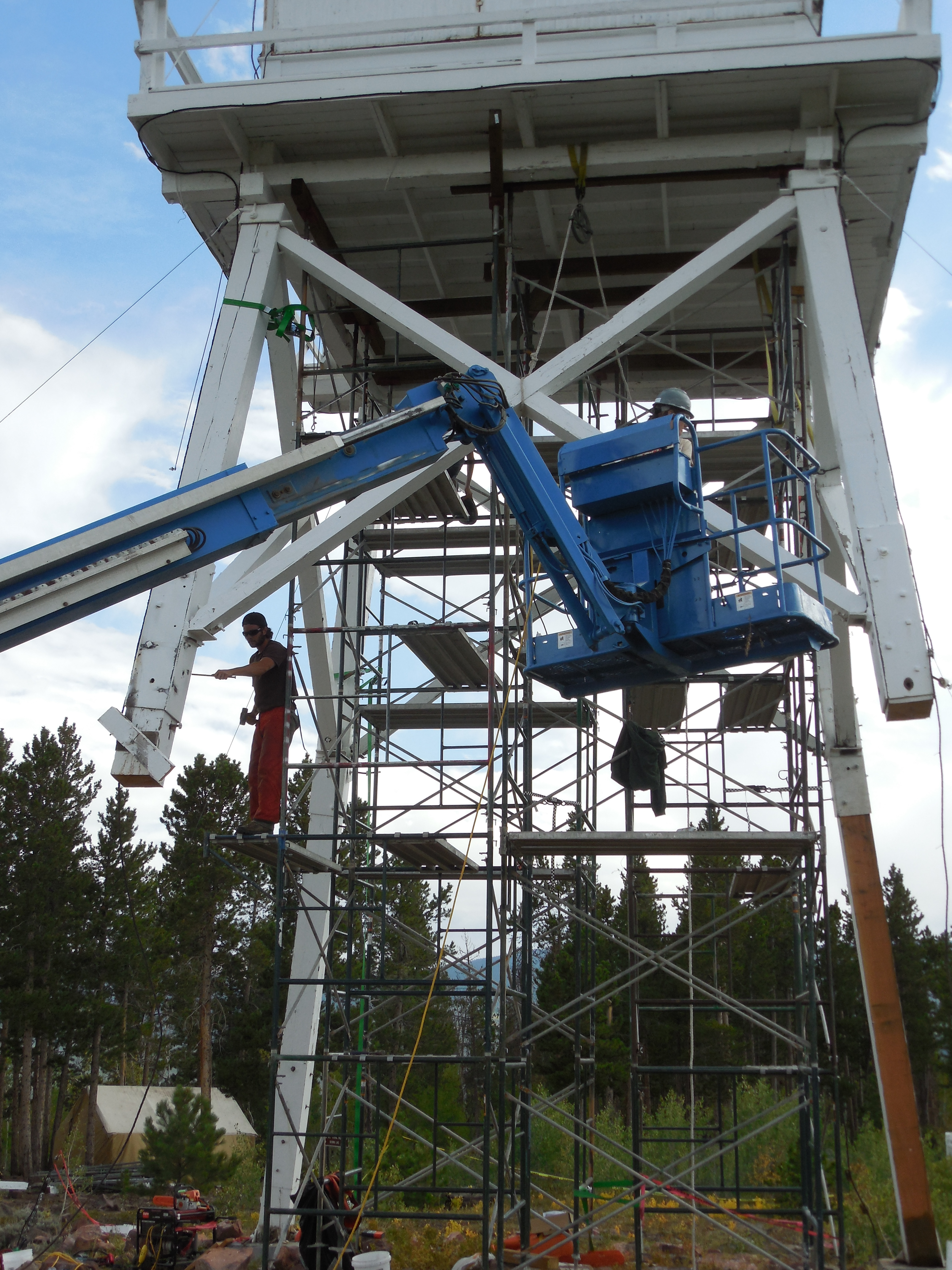
Tower restoration, September 2013

The Ute Mountain Fire Tower is a fire lookout tower in the Ashley National Forest in western Daggett County, Utah, United States, southwest of Manila, that is listed on the National Register of Historic Places.

== Description ==
The tower was built in 1937 and was added to the National Register of Historic Places on April 10, 1980.

== History ==
Restoration of the tower was completed in 2013-2014.

== See also ==
- National Register of Historic Places listings in Daggett County, Utah
