= Cold Spring Mountain =

Mountain in Colorado

- O-WI-YU-KUTS

Highest point
- Elevation: 8609
- Coordinates: 40°53′42.31″N 108°52′17.07″W

Geography
- Location: Moffat County
- Country: United States
- State: Colorado
- Region: Browns Park
- Topo map: Topozone Cold Spring Mountain

Climbing
- Normal route: no formal trails

Cold Spring Mountain is a summit in Moffat County, Colorado. It was also known as O-WI-YU-KUTS Plateau. It is on the United States Geological Survey (USGS) topographic maps of Sparks, Beaver Basin, Willow Creek Butte, Big Joe Basin, and Irish Canyon.

== West Cold Spring Wilderness Study Area ==
In 1980, the West Cold Spring Wilderness Study Area was established by the Bureau of Land Management (BLM). It includes 3,200 acres in Daggett County, Utah and 18,036 acres in Moffat County, Colorado. It is about 65 miles northwest of Maybell and 95 miles northwest of Craig, Colorado. Little Snake is the designated BLM field office. Backpacking, hiking, fishing, camping and hunting are activities to be enjoyed at West Cold Spring.

It is on the western portion of the south-facing slopes and deep draws and canyons through the O-Wi-Yu-Kuts Plateau, and forming ridges and plateaus on the northern side of the Green River valley. The elevation range is from ~5,749 to ~8,212 feet. There is a range of riparian vegetation along Beaver Creek Canyon and Spitzie Draw, including sagebrush steppe, saltbush, aspen, pine, and oak scrub. There are various songbirds and snakes. Black bear, mountain lion, mule deer, beaver, elk, fox, and coyote are among the fauna of the area. Beaver Creek has trout.

== History ==
There are prehistoric cultural sites of the Paleo-Indian and historic cultural sites from the Shoshone and Ute tribes. See also List of prehistoric sites in Colorado, and History of Colorado

Cowboy and outlaw Isom Dart lived near the top of the mountain, close to his horse ranch and Browns Park. He was killed there in 1900 by Tom Horn, a stock investigator and former Pinkerton detective.
