= Swett Ranch =

Ranch in Daggett County, Utah, United States

- U.S. National Register of Historic Places
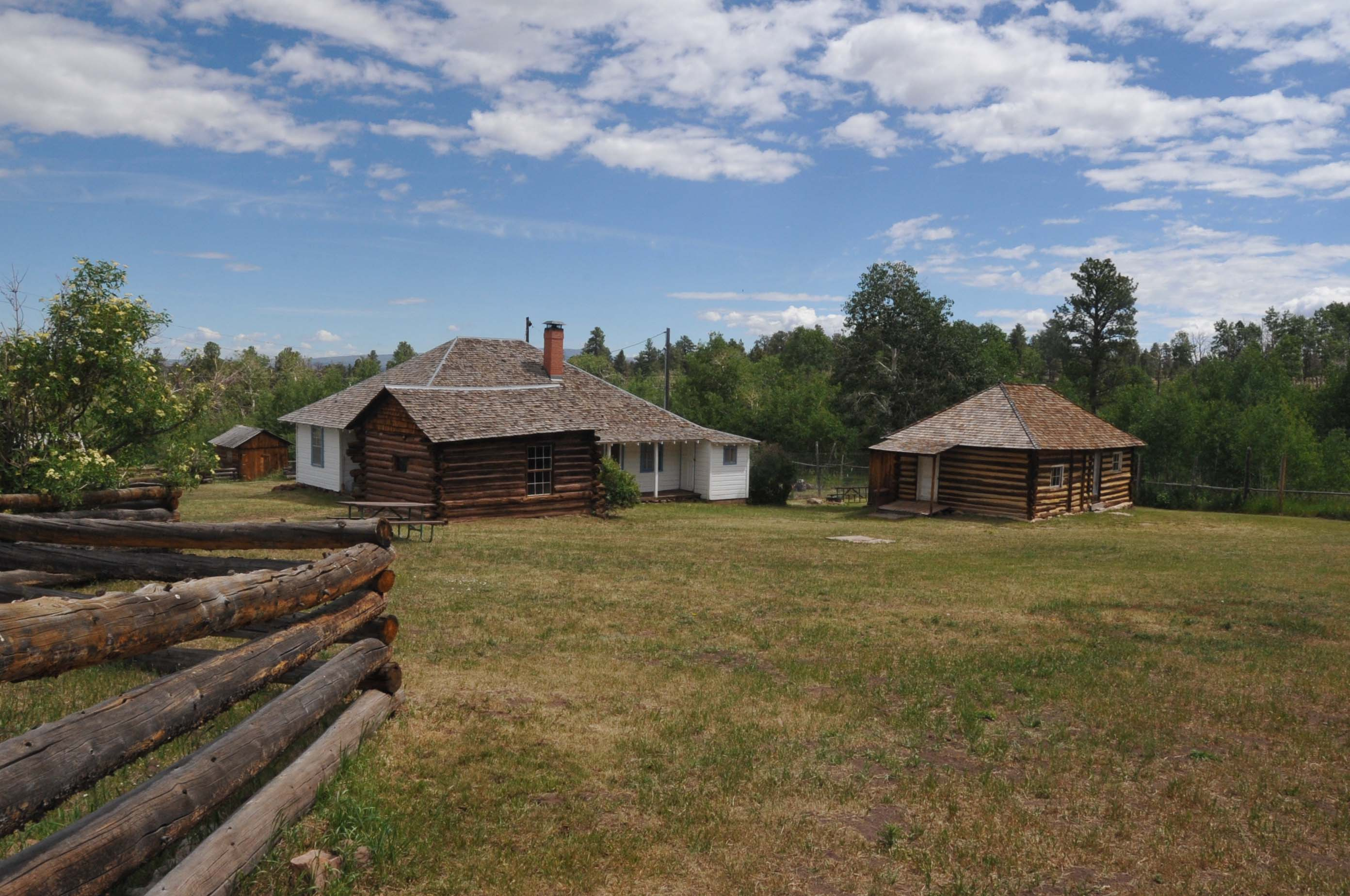
- Swett Ranch, June 2013

- Location within Utah Location within the United States
- Nearest city: Dutch John, Utah
- Coordinates: 40°52′46″N 109°29′15″W
- Area: 14.1 acres (5.7 ha)
- Built: 1909
- Built by: Swett, Oscar
- NRHP reference No.: 79002492
- Added to NRHP: July 10, 1979

Swett Ranch is a ranch in Daggett County, Utah, United States, a part of which is listed on the National Register of Historic Places (NRHP).

== Description ==
The ranch is located southwest of Dutch John, has buildings dating from 1909. A 14.1 acres (5.7 ha) section of the ranch was listed on the NRHP in 1979. It included nine contributing buildings and three contributing structures.

Historic function: Domestic; Industry/processing/extraction; Agriculture/subsistence Historic subfunction: Processing; Single Dwelling; Agricultural Outbuildings; Animal Facility; Manufacturing Facility; Secondary Structure; Storage Criteria: event, architecture/engineering

It includes a largely original corral built in 1905 for collecting Oscar Swett's cattle, before he homesteaded there.

== See also ==
- National Register of Historic Places listings in Daggett County, Utah
