= Museum of Northwest Colorado =

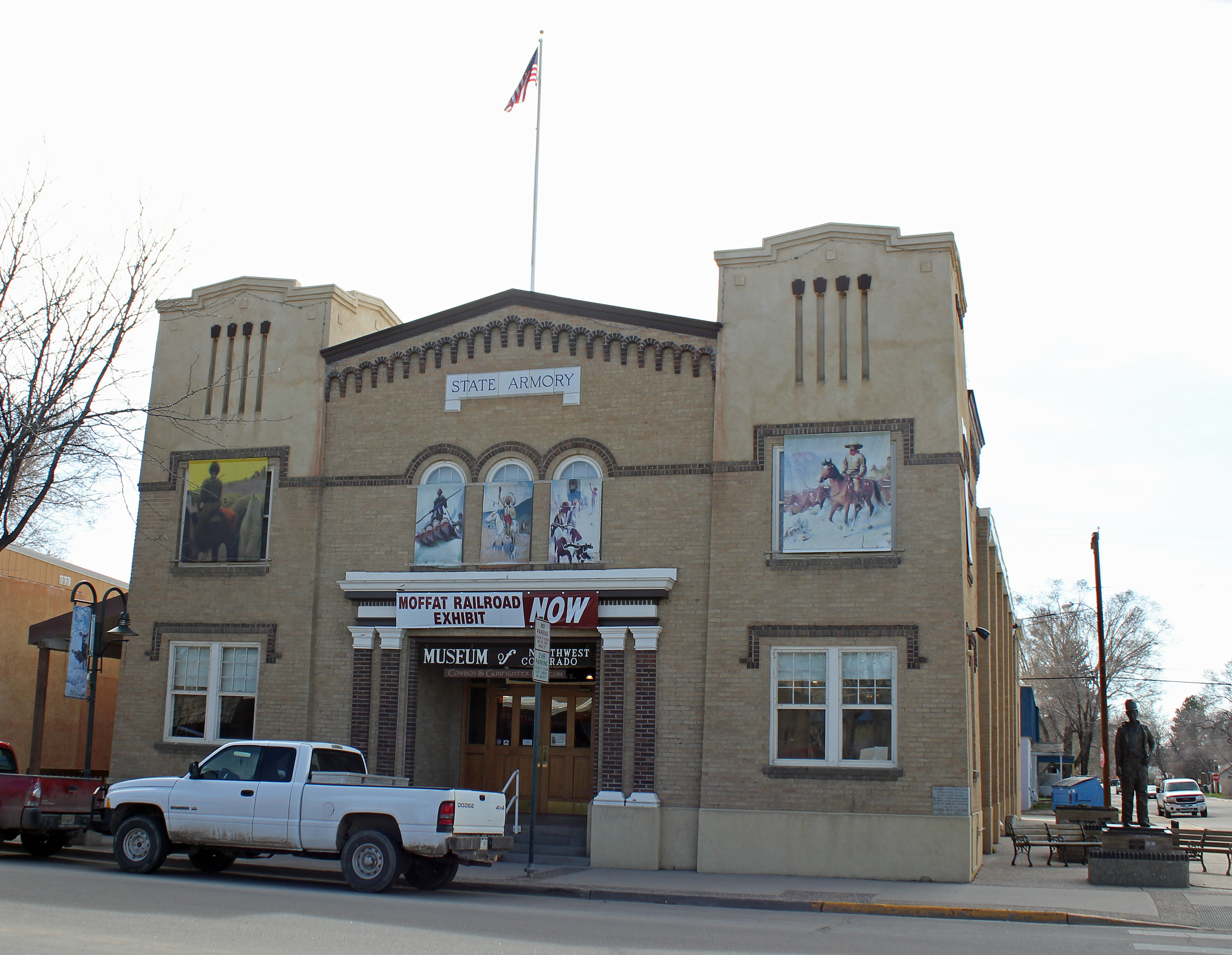
- Established: 1991
- Location: 590 Yampa Avenue; Craig, Colorado
- Coordinates: 40.51587°N 107.54755°W
- Type: American West museum
- Website: www.museumnwco.org

The Museum of Northwest Colorado, located in Craig, Colorado, was established in 1964 as the Moffat County Museum to house artifacts and preserve legends of the Old West.

The museum features a large, nationally recognized cowboy gear collection, that includes rare Winchesters, Colts, chaps, spurs, saddles, gun leather, and other artifacts. The Moffat Road Railroad Display features photos and memorabilia about the Denver, Northwestern & Pacific Railway, founded by David Moffat. Other exhibits include American outlaw Harry Tracy and includes his actual gun rig, Ann Basset along with her original spurs, African American cowboy Isam Dart who was murdered by Tom Horn etc. Also included are displays regarding mining, ranching and pioneer artifacts, rocks and fossils including a large dinosaur footprint and bones, and period historic room displays.

== State Armory building ==
- State Armory
- U.S. National Register of Historic Places
- Location within Colorado
- Location: 590 Yampa Ave., Craig, Colorado
- Area: less than one acre
- Built: 1922
- Architect: John J. Huddart
- Architectural style: Late 19th and 20th Century Revivals, Mediterranean Revival
- NRHP reference No.: 92000810
- Added to NRHP: June 25, 1992

Originally housed in the Moffat County Courthouse, the museum opened in the former Colorado State Armory in 1991. The building, at 590 Yampa Ave. in Craig, was built in 1922 and was listed on the National Register of Historic Places in 1992 as State Armory. It was designed by architect John J. Huddart.
