= John Jarvie Historic Ranch District =

Historic district in Utah, United States

- U.S. National Register of Historic Places
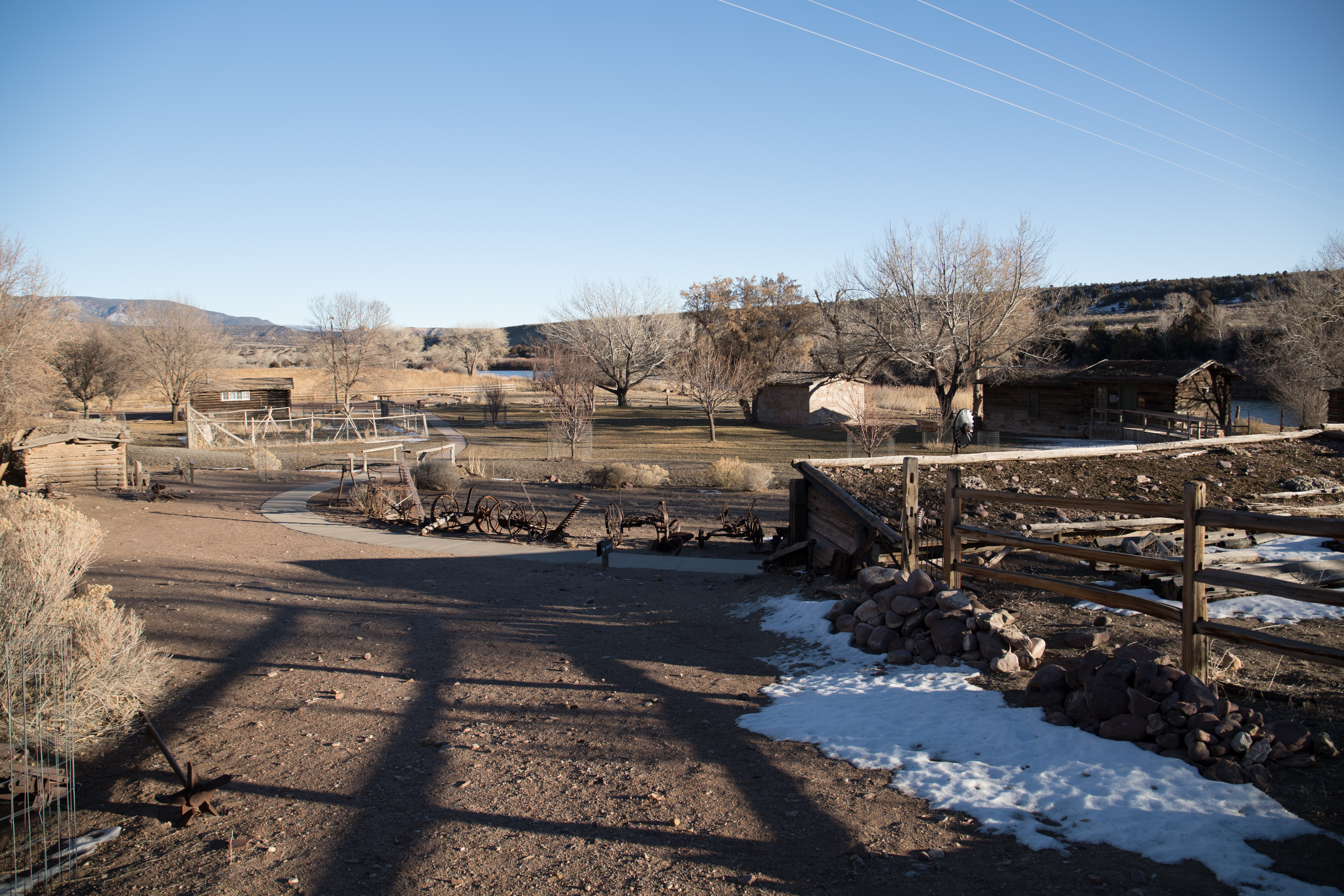

- Location within Utah Location within the United States
- Location: Green River and Indian Crossing Bridge SW of Jarvis, Brown's Park, Utah
- Coordinates: 40°54′03″N 109°10′32″W
- Area: 35.4 acres (14.3 ha)
- Built by: John Jarvie and others
- Architectural style: Log building; dugout house
- NRHP reference No.: 86000232
- Added to NRHP: January 14, 1986

The John Jarvie Historic Ranch District, in the Utah portion of Brown's Park, is a historic district which was listed on the National Register of Historic Places in 1986.

It is located at Green River and Indian Crossing Bridge east of Dutch John, Utah. The listing included six contributing buildings, five contributing structures, and five contributing objects on 35.4 acres (14.3 ha).

It was maintained by the Bureau of Land Management (BLM) as an interpretive site by 1983,

and in 2019 remains open to the public. According to the BLM, the public is invited to:

Explore where the wild west is still wild, where Butch Cassidy and the Sundance Kid hid out from the long arms of the law, where traders made a mint, and where a business complemented the turn-of-the-century frontier life in Brown's Park. / In 1880, John Jarvie, a Scotsman built a ranch along the Green River to offer store goods to those that lived or traveled in this wild territory. Jarvie chose this location due to a naturally occurring river crossing which was used by Indians, fur trappers, travelers, and local residents. At its height, the Jarvie ranch operation included a store, post office, river ferry, and cemetery. / At the historic ranch, you’ll find the stone house, which is a one-room, rectangular building. It was built by outlaw Jack Bennett, using masonry skills he learned in prison. This is also the museum where displays decorate the walls and a video of the history of the ranch can be viewed. You’ll also get to duck inside the two-room dugout where John and his wife Nellie first lived. It is built into a hillside with a south-facing entrance overlooking the Green River.
