= Gates of Lodore =

Canyon entrance in Colorado

Coordinates: 40°42′47″N 108°53′34″W

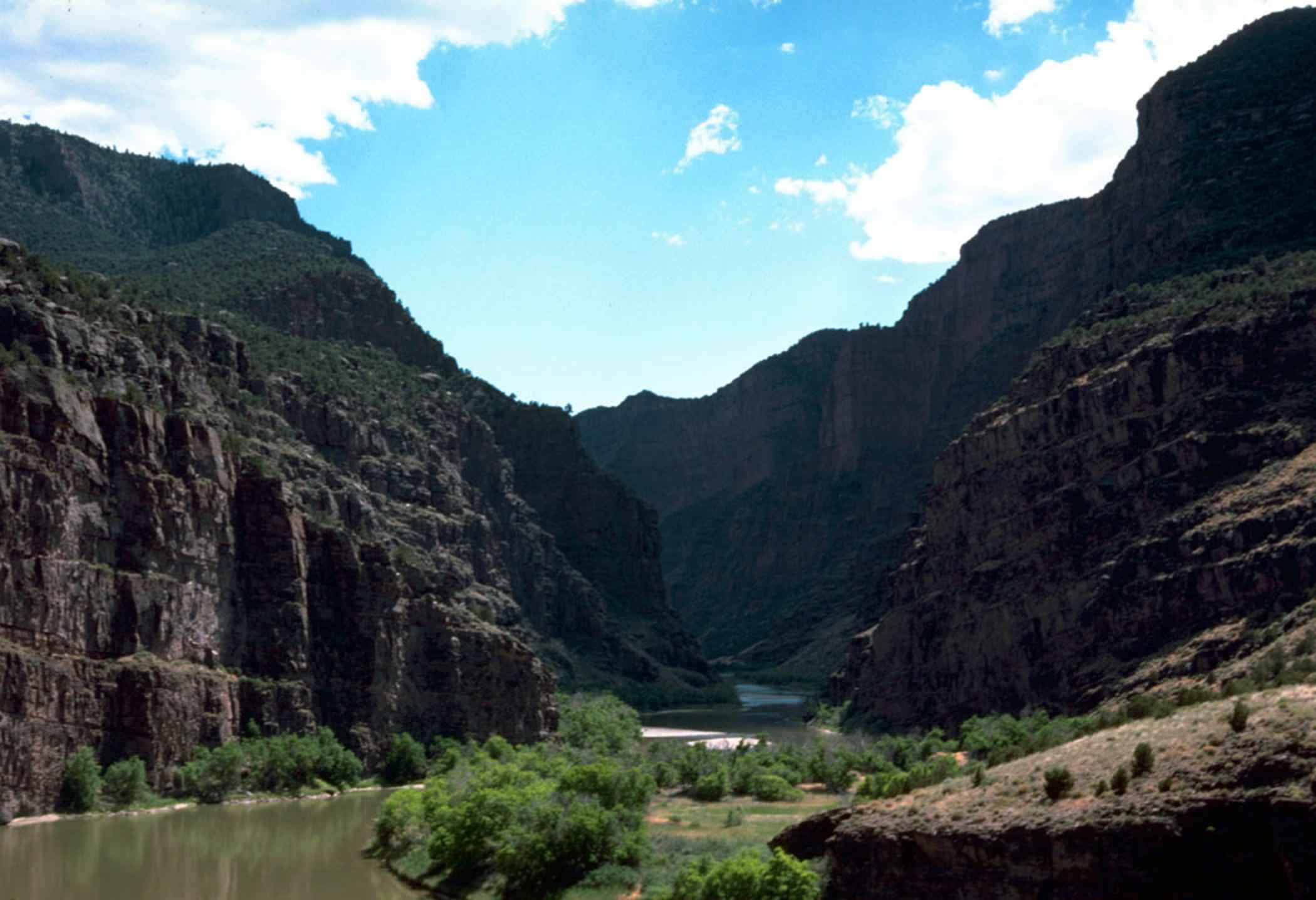
Gates of Lodore – Entrance to Lodore Canyon – Green River – Dinosaur National Monument

The Gates of Lodore is the scenic entrance to the Canyon of Lodore, a canyon on the Green River in northwestern Colorado, United States. The name Gates of Lodore has become synonymous with the canyon itself and the two names are used interchangeably. The Canyon commences as the Green River departs Browns Park and cuts through the Uinta Mountains meandering eighteen miles until its end at Echo Park, the confluence of the Green and Yampa Rivers. It was named by the Powell Expedition after the English poem Cataract of Lodore. It is located in Dinosaur National Monument.
