= Cataract of Lodore =

Poem by Robert Southey

Coordinates: 54.55907°N 3.13808°W

Lodore Falls shown within Cumbria
(grid reference NY265188)

"The Cataract of Lodore" is a poem written in 1820 by the English poet Robert Southey which describes the Lodore Falls on the Watendlath.

== Publication history ==
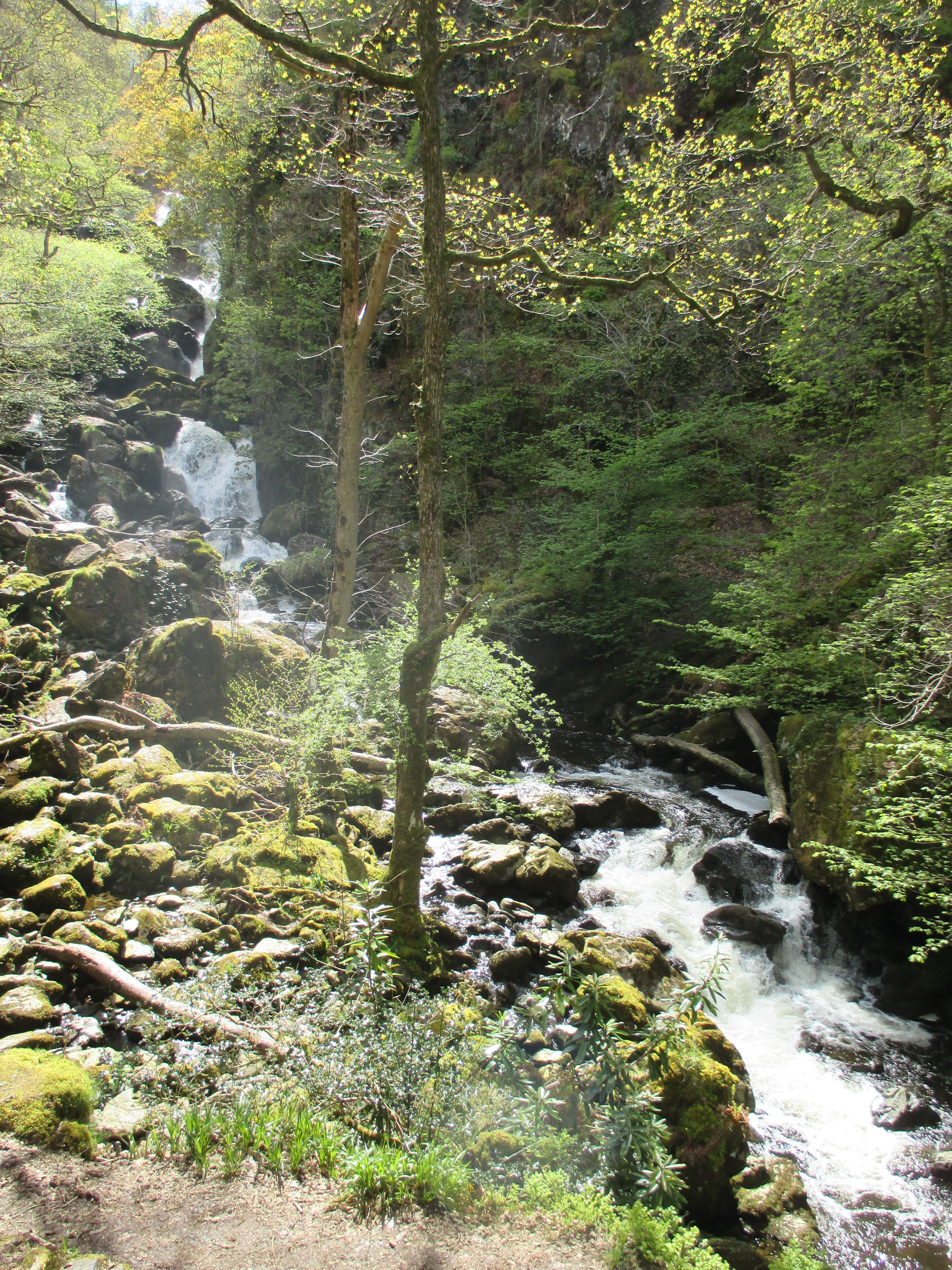
Lodore Falls

One of Southey's most popular poems, "The Cataract of Lodore" made an early appearance in Joanna Baillie's 1823 anthology, Poems, Chiefly Manuscript, and from Living Authors. On its inclusion, Baillie wrote Southey, "Your Cataract of Lodore has pleased & amused me exceedingly ... We shall have the younger part of my readers running about with portions of it in their mouths and shaking their heads to the measure, for these six months to come."

== Lodore Falls ==
The Lodore Falls, a must-see for Victorian tourists staying at Keswick, are formed by the beck from Watendlath Tarn cascading over huge boulders for a distance of some 100 feet. The main drop of the falls is about 28 metres, or 90 feet. Although the falls are spectacular after periods of heavy rain, they dry to a trickle in periods of prolonged dry weather.

== See also ==
- Samuel Taylor Coleridge
