= Browns Park =

Mountain valley in Utah

- Location within Colorado

Highest point
- Coordinates: 40°52′49″N 109°09′48″W

Geography
- Location: Moffat County, Colorado / Daggett County, Utah, Western United States

Brown's Park or Browns Park, originally called Brown's Hole, is an isolated mountain valley along the Green River in Moffat County, Colorado and Daggett County, Utah, in the United States. The valley begins in far eastern Utah, approximately 25 miles (40 km) downstream from Flaming Gorge Dam, and follows the river downstream into Colorado, ending at the Gates of Lodore in Dinosaur National Monument. Known as a haven for outlaws such as Butch Cassidy and Tom Horn during the late 19th century and the early 20th century, it is now the location of the Browns Park National Wildlife Refuge. It was also the birthplace of Ann Bassett. She and her sister, Josie Bassett, were considered female outlaws and girlfriends to several of Cassidy's Wild Bunch gang. It is the location of John Jarvie Historic Ranch, where, in 1880, Scotsman John Jarvie built a ranch along the Green River.

== History ==
According to Robert Redford, The earliest-known reference to Brown's Park was made in 1650 in the writings of Father Ortiz, a Spanish missionary. In 1825, the expedition of William H. Ashley and his fur trappers penetrated the valley in bull-boats along the Green River. In 1827 Kit Carson traded here among the Ute and Shoshone Indians. The same year a trader named Baptiste Chalifoux came to the valley with his Indian wife and the valley was named in his honor under the alias 'Baptiste Brown'."

In the early 19th century, when the Euro-Americans first entered the area, the area was inhabited by Comanche, Shoshoni, and Ute tribal groups. Blackfoot, Sioux, Cheyenne, Arapaho, and Navajo tribes also visited or used the area. The use of the area by Native Americans was documented by the 1776 Domínguez–Escalante expedition and by the 1805 Lewis and Clark Expedition. In the 1830s the valley became a favorite location for fur trappers and settlers. In 1837 Fort Davy Crockett was constructed as a trading post and as defense against attacks by the Blackfoot. The fort was abandoned in the 1840s and the population of settlers declined. After the discovery of gold in California in 1848, the valley emerged among ranchers as a favorite wintering ground for cattle. By the 1860s it had acquired a reputation as haven for cattle rustlers, horse thieves, and outlaws, alongside Hole-in-the-Wall, Wyoming and Robbers Roost in Utah. During its outlaw heyday, the Browns Park ethic allowed for most "outlaw deeds" except murder.

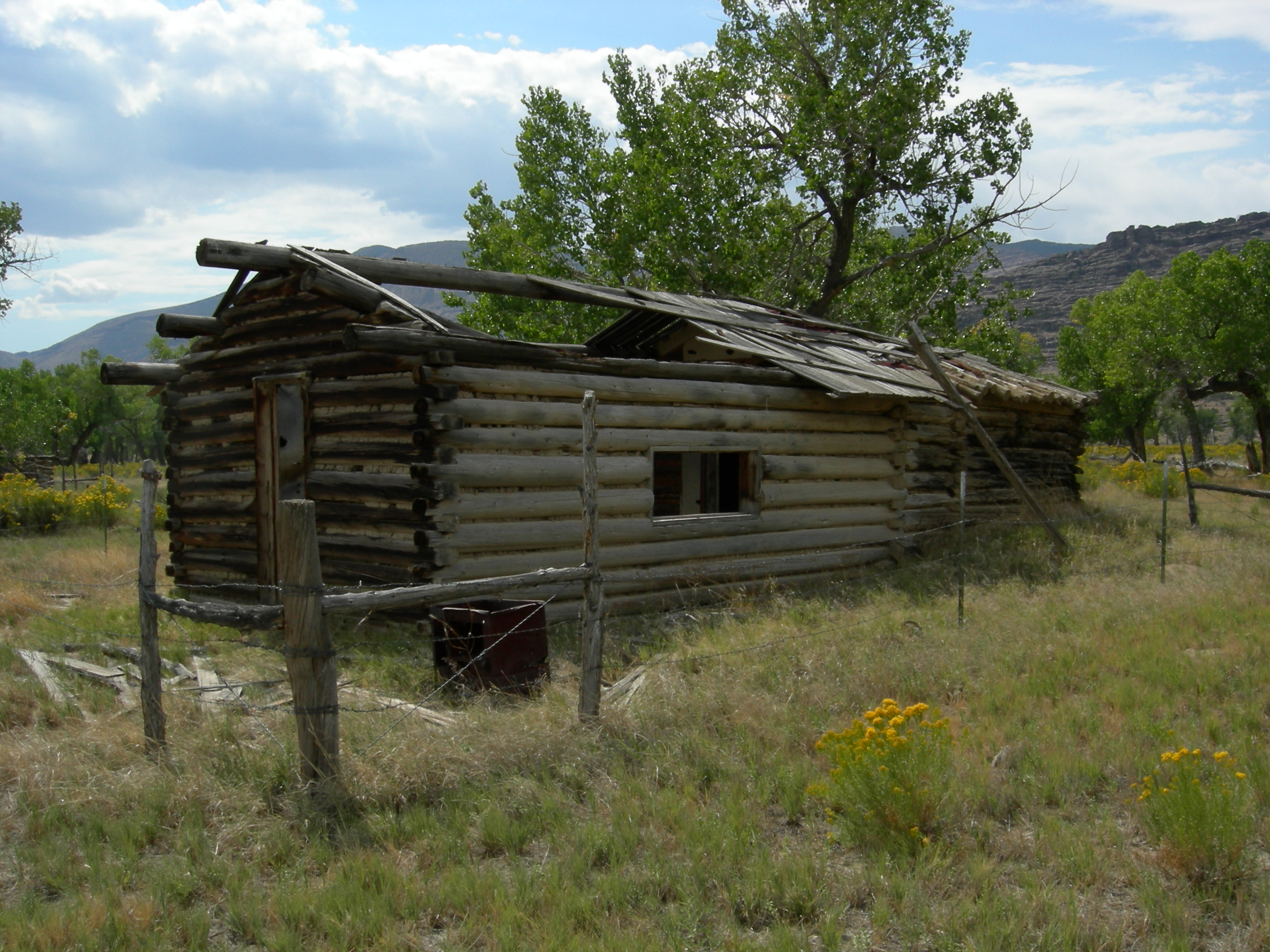
The Wilson Place, near Lodore Hall

In 1965 the valley became part of the Browns Park National Wildlife Refuge, designated as a habitat for migratory waterfowl. The refuge contains the remains of several historic sites, including "Two Bar Ranch" headquarters; Fort Davy Crockett; Lodore Hall (which still serves as a community center); and several old abandoned cabins and homesteader settlements.

== Locations of interest in Browns Park ==
- Browns Park National Wildlife Refuge
- Crouse Canyon – historic horse trail, modern dirt road
- Gates of Lodore – historic and modern river access point
- Irish Canyon – historic horse trail, modern dirt road, petroglyph site
- John Jarvie Homestead – restored historic homestead
- Old Ladore School, or Lodore Hall – restored historic school and community hall - listed on the National Register of Historic Places
- Swinging Bridge – single lane suspension bridge
- Two-Bar ranch ruins - near Lodore hall - National Register of Historic Places
- Vermillion Falls – historic Vermillion Creek site

== See also ==
- Cold Spring Mountain
- Elizabeth Bassett (cattle rustler)
- Isom Dart, wild horse rancher and outlaw
- Josie Bassett Morris Ranch Complex
- John Jarvie Historic Ranch
