= Flaming Gorge-Uintas Scenic Byway =

Scenic highway in Utah, United States

Coordinates: 40°51′51″N 109°28′58″W

Flaming Gorge-Uintas Scenic Byway

Route information
- Maintained by UDOT
- Length: 79.558 mi (128.036 km)
- Existed: 1988–present
- Component highways: US 191; SR-44

Major junctions
- South end: US 40 in Vernal
- North end: Wyoming state line SR-43 in Manila

Location
- Country: United States
- State: Utah
- Counties: Uintah; Daggett

Highway system
- Scenic Byways; National; National Forest; BLM; NPS; Utah State Highway System; Interstate; US; State; Minor; Scenic

The Flaming Gorge - Uintas Scenic Byway is a National Scenic Byway in the state of Utah. It spans approximately 80 miles (130 km) as it travels from Vernal, Utah northward through the Ashley National Forest and the Uintah Mountains to the area around Flaming Gorge National Recreation Area in the northeastern corner of the state.

== Route description ==
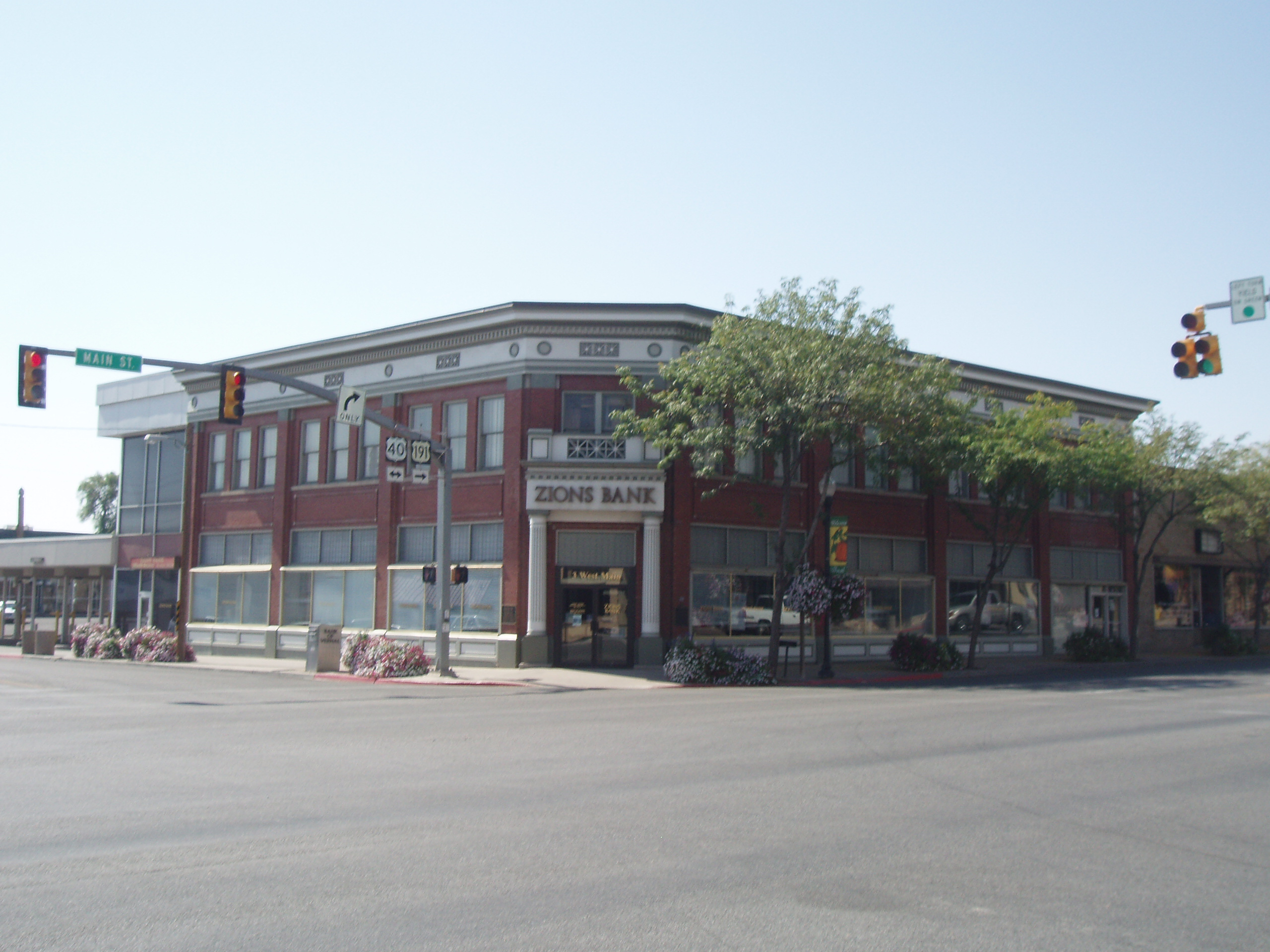
Southern terminus of the scenic byway in Vernal, October 2010

The south end of this route starts out in Vernal, Uintah County at the intersection of US-40 and US-191. From there, it travels north on US-191, enters Ashley National Forest, and passes Steinaker State Park and Red Fleet State Park as it starts to climb into the Uinta Mountains. It continues north on its climb, encountering several switchbacks before topping out close to 8,400 feet (2,600 m) in elevation. As it gradually starts to descend it enters Daggett County before it enters Flaming Gorge National Recreation Area. Just inside the recreation area boundaries, the route splits in two.

Taking the right branch continues on US-191 to the northeast, passing over an inlet to Flaming Gorge Reservoir via a suspension bridge, before crossing Flaming Gorge Dam, and passing by the town of Dutch John. From here the route curves back around the southwest portion of Flaming Gorge reservoir, travelling northwest to Dutch John Gap, turning north through the gap, and turning to the northeast again after exiting Flaming Gorge National Recreation Area, continuing until the Wyoming state border.

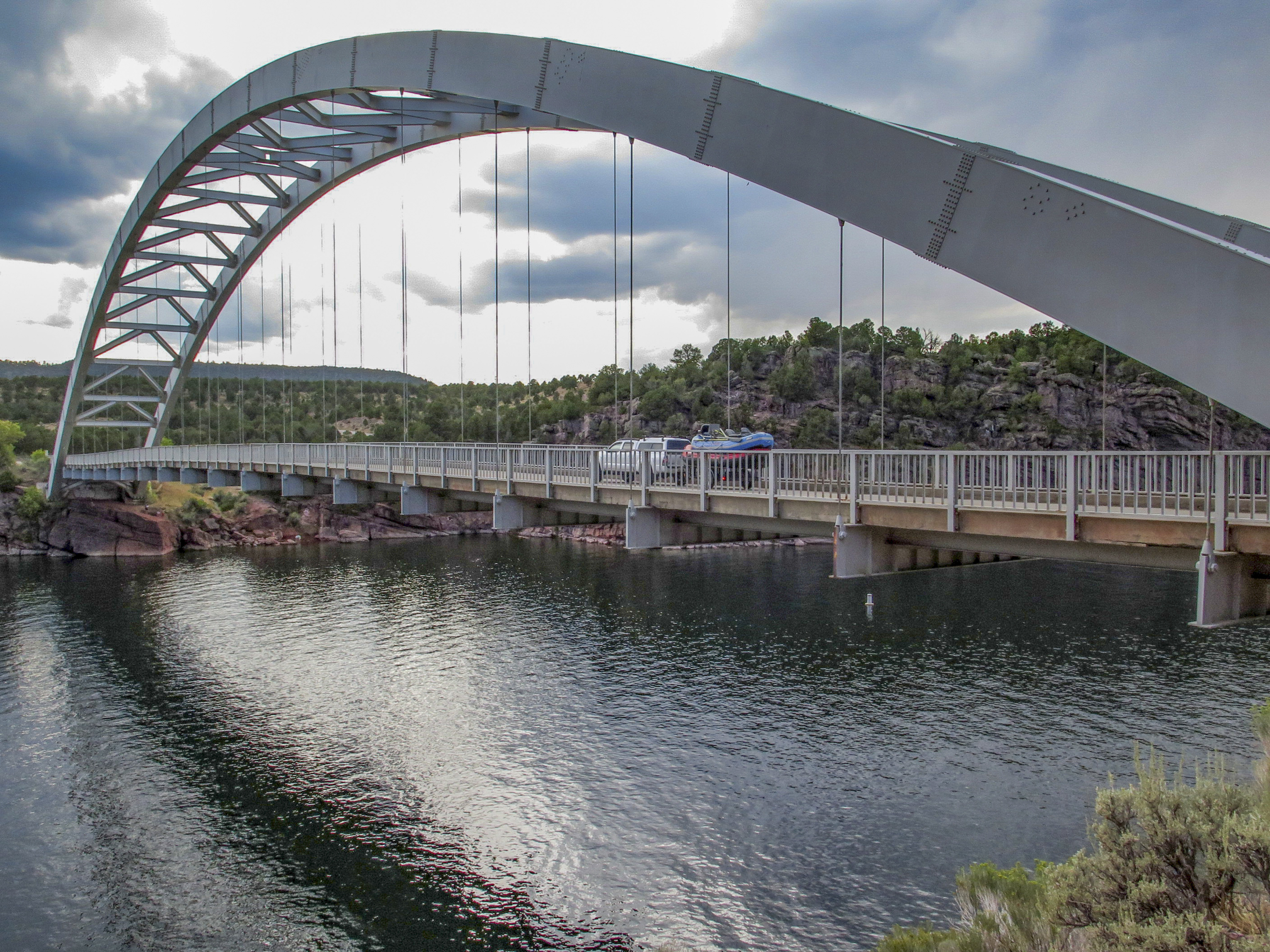
Cart Creek Bridge over the Flaming Gorge Reservoir, August 2018

Taking the left branch, the route follows SR-44 westward, which forms the southern boundary of the recreation area in this area, roughly following the southern rim of Flaming Gorge, passing a turnoff to the Red Canyon Overlook and Visitors Center. As SR-44 approaches the western edge of the recreation area, it starts to turn in a northerly direction overall, descending in a series of turns as it approaches the southwestern tip of Flaming Gorge Reservoir and passes through Sheep Creek Gap. From this point, the route turns north, exits the recreation area, and continues a few miles further before it ends at the intersection of SR-43 in Manila.

== History ==
For the histories of this route's constituent highways prior to its scenic byway designation, refer to:

- US-191
- SR-44

The scenic byway was formed in 1988 as Utah's first Forest Service Byway. It was added to the National Scenic Byways system on June 9, 1998.

== Major intersections ==
=== Southern portion ===
County	Location	mi	km	Destinations	Notes
Uintah	Vernal	0.000	0.000	US 40 (Main Street)	Southern terminus
Uintah		5.558	8.945	SR-301 to Steinaker State Park	
Uintah		10.120	16.287	Access road to Red Fleet State Park	
Uintah		17.083	27.492	Route enters Ashley National Forest	
Daggett		32.535	52.360	Route leaves Ashley National Forest; enters Flaming Gorge National Recreation Area	
Daggett	Greendale Junction	34.695	55.836	SR-44	Route splits in two at this point
1.000 mi = 1.609 km; 1.000 km = 0.621 mi

=== Northeast branch (US-191) ===
County	Location	mi	km	Destinations	Notes
Daggett	Greendale Junction	34.665	55.788	SR-44	
Daggett		40.744– 40.959	65.571– 65.917	Overpass over Flaming Gorge Dam	
Daggett		48.454	77.979	Route leaves Flaming Gorge National Recreation Area	
Daggett		51.557	82.973	Wyoming state line	Northern terminus
1.000 mi = 1.609 km; 1.000 km = 0.621 mi

=== Northwest branch (SR-44) ===
County	Location	mi	km	Destinations	Notes
Daggett	Greendale Junction	34.665	55.788	US 191	
Daggett		38.117	61.343	Access road to Red Canyon Visitors Center	
Daggett		58.114	93.525	Route leaves Flaming Gorge National Recreation Area	
Daggett	Manila	62.660	100.841	SR-43 (Center Street)	Northern terminus
1.000 mi = 1.609 km; 1.000 km = 0.621 mi
