= U.S. Route 191 in Utah =

Section of U.S. Numbered Highway in Utah, United States

U.S. Route 191
- US 191 highlighted in red

Route information
- Maintained by UDOT
- Length: 404.168 mi (650.445 km)
- Existed: 1981–present
- Tourist routes: US 191 from Crescent Junction through Vernal is part of the Dinosaur Diamond Prehistoric Highway
- NHS: South of I-70 and concurrencies with I-70, US 6, and US 40

Major junctions
- South end: US 191 / BIA Route 12 at the Arizona state line in Mexican Water, AZ
- US 163 in Bluff; US 491 in Monticello; I-70 / US 6 / US 50 east of Green River; I-70 / US 50 west of Green River; US 6 north of Helper; US 40 in Duchesne; US 40 in Vernal
- North end: US 191 at the Wyoming state line near Dutch John

Location
- Country: United States
- State: Utah
- Counties: San Juan, Grand, Emery, Carbon, Duchesne, Uintah, Daggett

Highway system
- United States Numbered Highway System; List; Special; Divided; Utah State Highway System; Interstate; US; State; Minor; Scenic
← SR-190	→ SR-193

U.S. Route 191 (US 191) is a major 404.168-mile (650.445 km), north–south U.S. Numbered Highway through eastern Utah, United States. The present alignment of US 191, which stretches from Mexico to Canada, was created in 1981 through Utah. Previously the route had entered northern Utah, ending at US 91 in Brigham City, but with the completion of Interstate 15 it was truncated to Yellowstone National Park and re-extended on a completely different alignment. In addition to a large portion of US 163, this extension absorbed several state routes: the former Utah State Route 33, most of Utah State Route 44, and the former Utah State Route 260.

== Route description ==
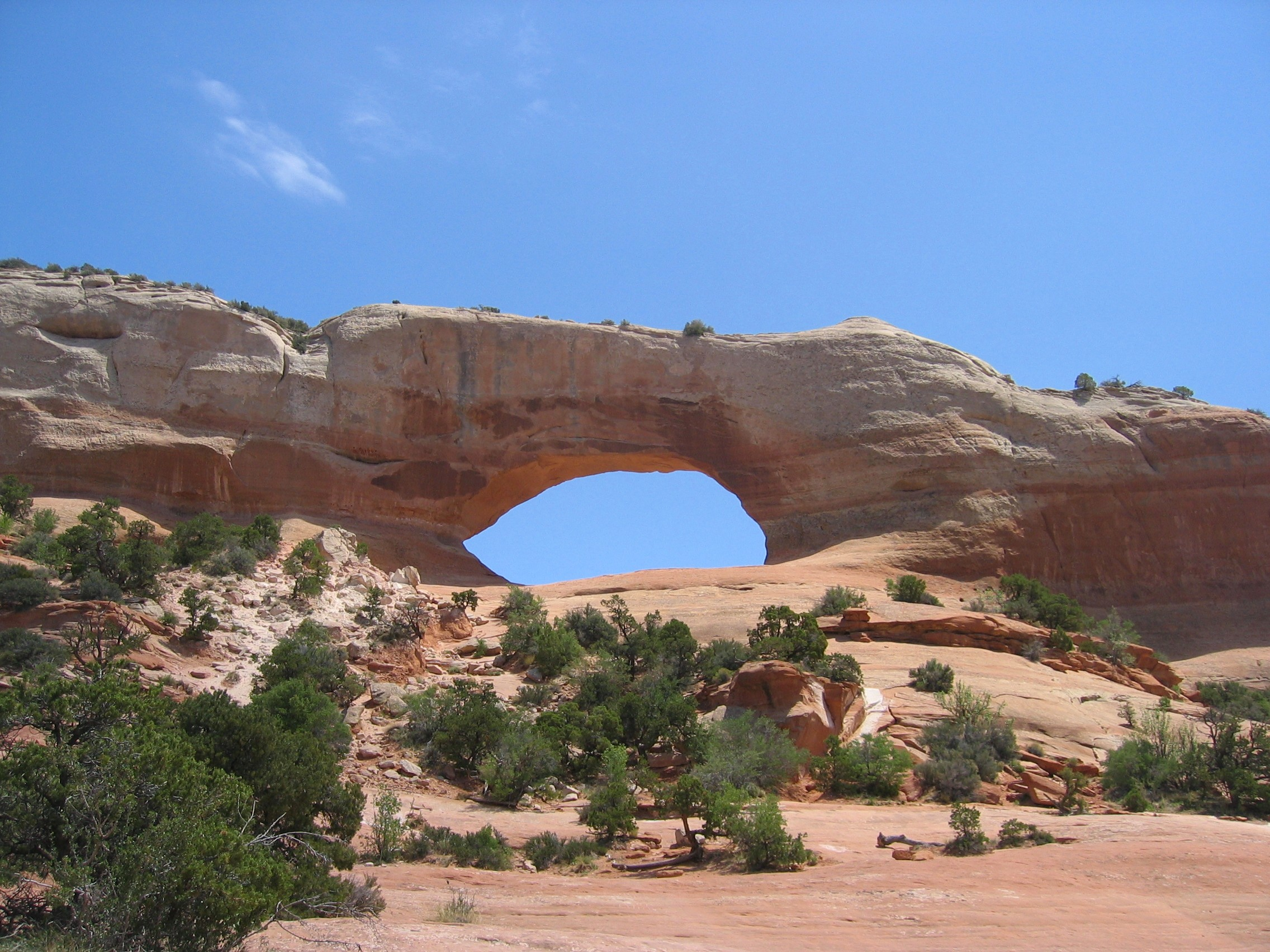
Wilson Arch alongside US-191 near La Sal Junction

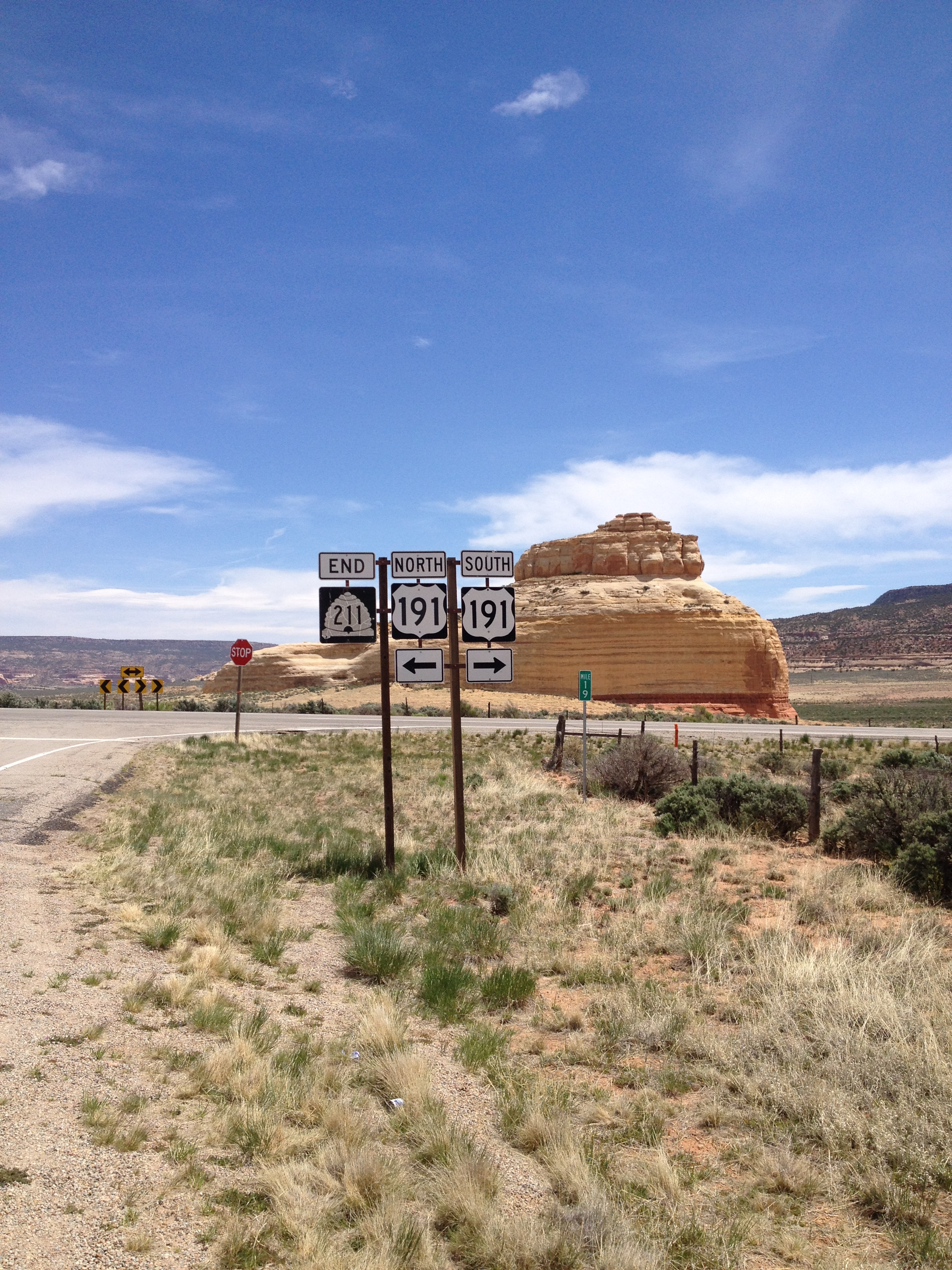
US 191 & Utah Route 211 Markers

US 191 enters Utah on Navajo Nation land and crosses mostly desolate parts of the state. The largest cities served by US 191 are Moab, Green River, Price, and Vernal. The highway nears the 10,000-foot (3,000 m) level in 2 places in Utah, over Indian Summit near Price and again while crossing the Uintah Mountains near Vernal. It leaves Utah at Flaming Gorge Reservoir. US 191 directly or indirectly serves a number of parks in eastern Utah: Monument Valley Navajo Tribal Park, Glen Canyon National Recreation Area, Hovenweep National Monument, Natural Bridges National Monument, Capitol Reef National Park, Canyonlands National Park, Arches National Park, Dead Horse Point State Park, Utahraptor State Park, Dinosaur National Monument, and Flaming Gorge National Recreation Area.

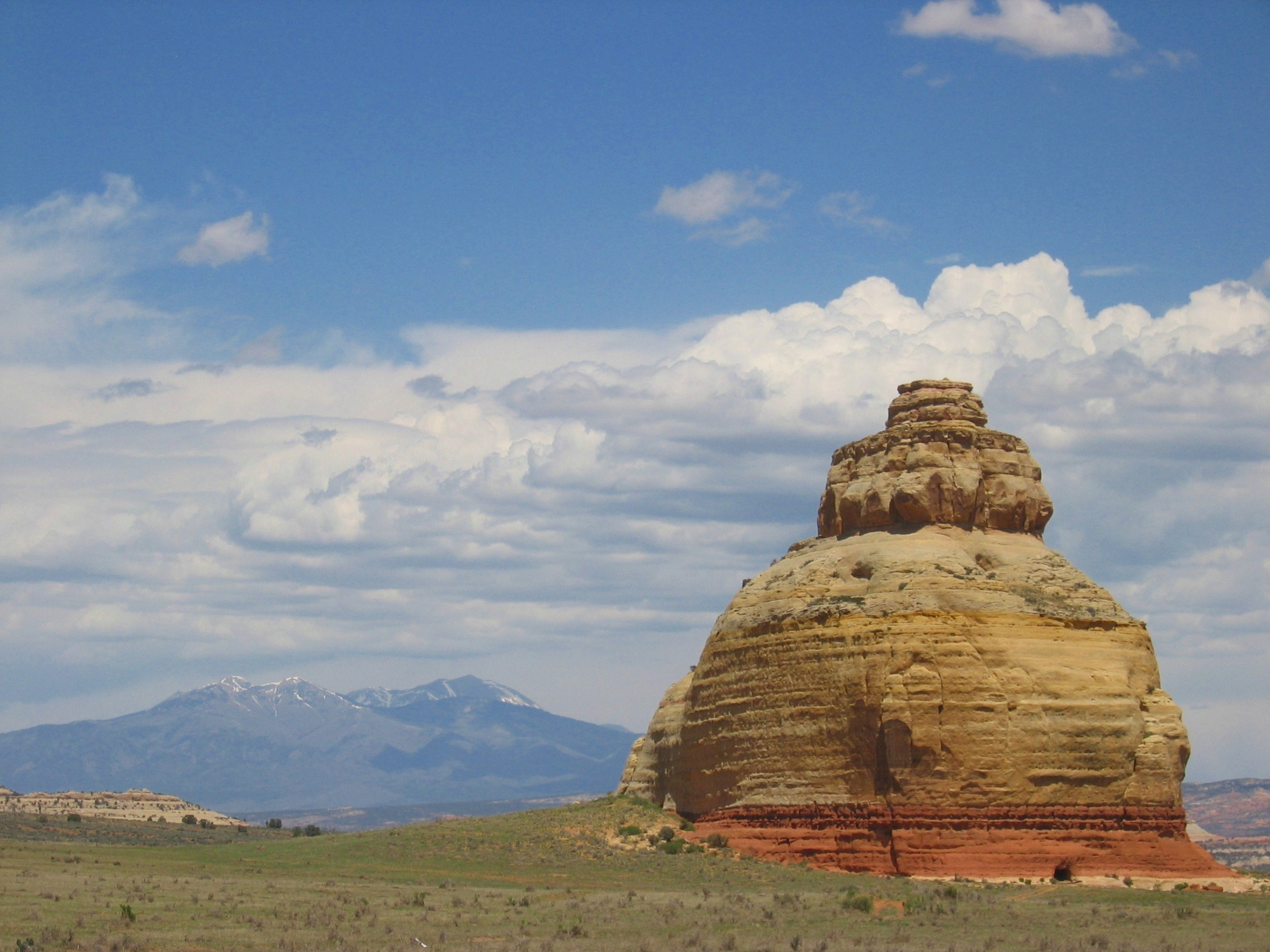
Church Rock, a landmark at the junction of US-191 with SR-211

Three portions of US 191 in Utah have been designated National Scenic Byways. Between U.S. Route 163 and State Route 95, US 191 forms part of the Trail of the Ancients. From Moab to Vernal, US-191 is a portion of the Dinosaur Diamond Prehistoric Highway. The Flaming Gorge-Uintas Scenic Byway begins at Vernal and follows US 191 to Flaming Gorge. The state has designated the portion from Helper to Duchesne as the Indian Canyon Scenic Byway, a Utah Scenic Byway.

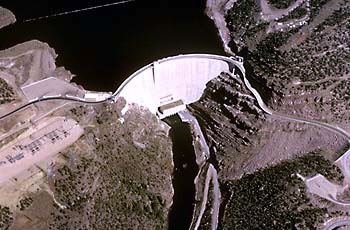
US-191 crossing the Flaming Gorge Dam

Three portions of US 191 in Utah have restrictions on trucks and other large vehicles. Between the junctions with State Routes 46 and 279, vehicles wider than 15 feet (4.57 m) are required to have two police escorts. Between Vernal and the Wyoming State line, vehicles longer than 95 feet (29 m) are required to have two certified pilot escorts. Vehicles heavier than 20,000 pounds (9,000 kg) per axle are prohibited on Flaming Gorge Dam.

The independent portions of US 191 south of Interstate 70, as well as the concurrencies with I-70, US 6, and US 40, are included as part of the National Highway System.

== History ==
When US 191 was created in 1926, it did not enter Utah, only running from Idaho Falls northeast to Yellowstone National Park. An extension in the late 1930s brought US-191 south to Brigham City, Utah, following what was then SR-41 and is now mostly SR-13. With the construction of I-15 parallel to US-191, the latter route was removed from Utah in the early 1970s, and by 1980 it only existed north of Yellowstone.

In cooperation with Montana, Wyoming, and Arizona, the Utah Department of Transportation submitted an application to the American Association of State Highway and Transportation Officials (AASHTO) for an extension of US-191. In Wyoming, it would replace US 187 - a single-state route, which was against current AASHTO policy — and then follow Wyoming Highway 373 to the state line. The portion in Utah replaced several state routes — State Route 260 from Wyoming to Greendale Junction, the majority of SR-44 to US-40 in Vernal, and SR-33 from US-40 in Duchesne to US-6 near Price. After overlapping US-6 past Green River, the routing followed and replaced a large portion of US-163 to a junction southwest of Bluff. Between Bluff and Mexican Water, Arizona, US-191 followed a newly constructed road across the Navajo Nation, and then replaced State Route 63, still mostly inside the reservation, to I-40 at Chambers. (It has since been continued along former US 666 to Douglas on the Mexican border.)

=== Arizona to US-6 ===
US-191 replaced part of US-163, formerly SR-9 and SR-47.

The road from Bluff north via Monticello, Moab, and Valley City to Thompson (a station on the Denver and Rio Grande Railroad) became a state highway in 1910. To connect this road with the rest of the state highway system, a road from Valley City northwest via Floy to Green River was added in 1912, as was a connection from Thompson to via Cisco to Colorado. An extension from Monticello southeast to Colorado was added in 1913, and in the 1920s most of these roadways were assigned numbers: State Route 8 went from Green River via Floy, Valley City, Thompson, and Cisco to Colorado, and State Route 9 began at Valley City and extended south via Moab to Monticello and east to Colorado.

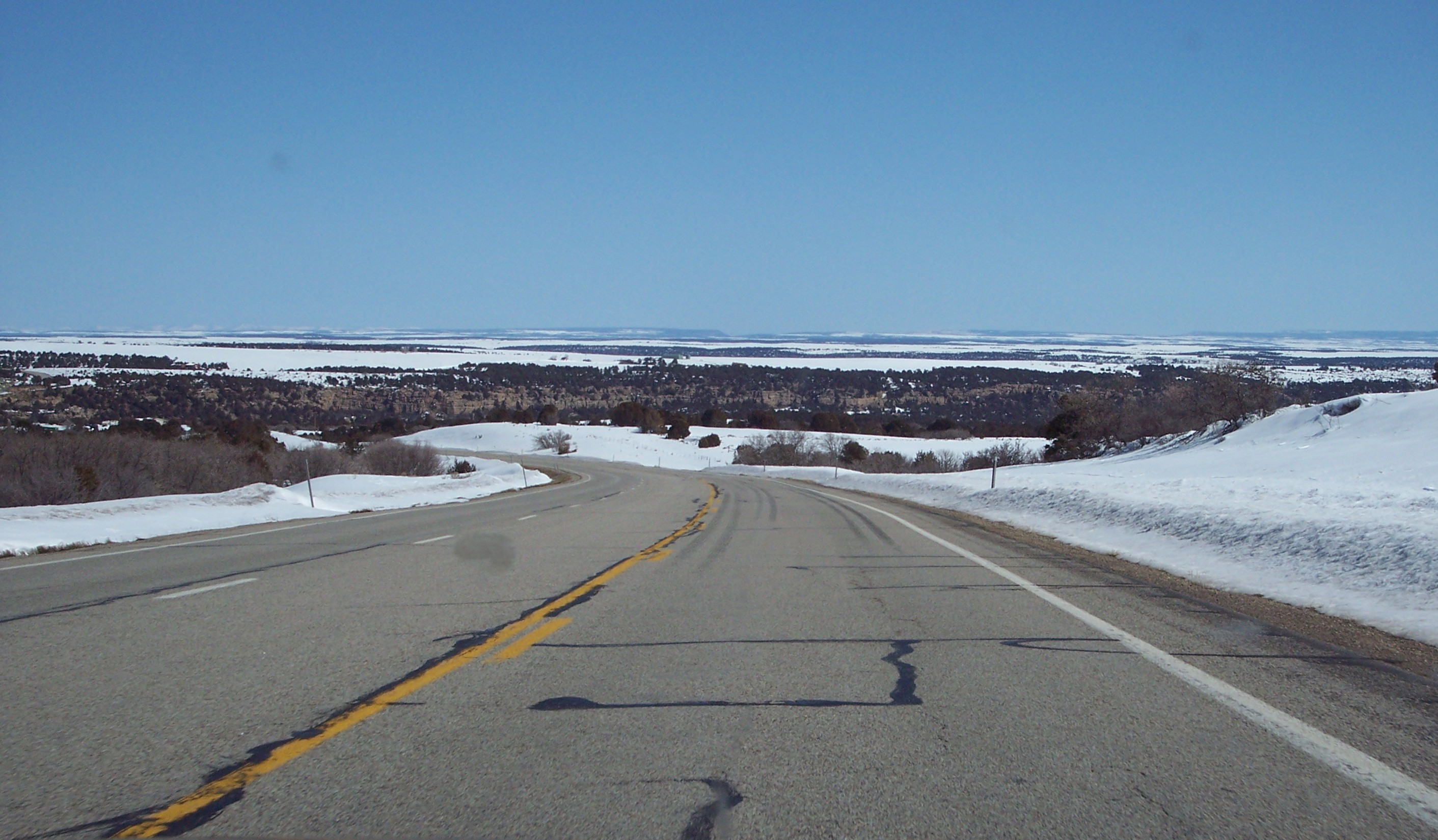
US 191 north of Blanding

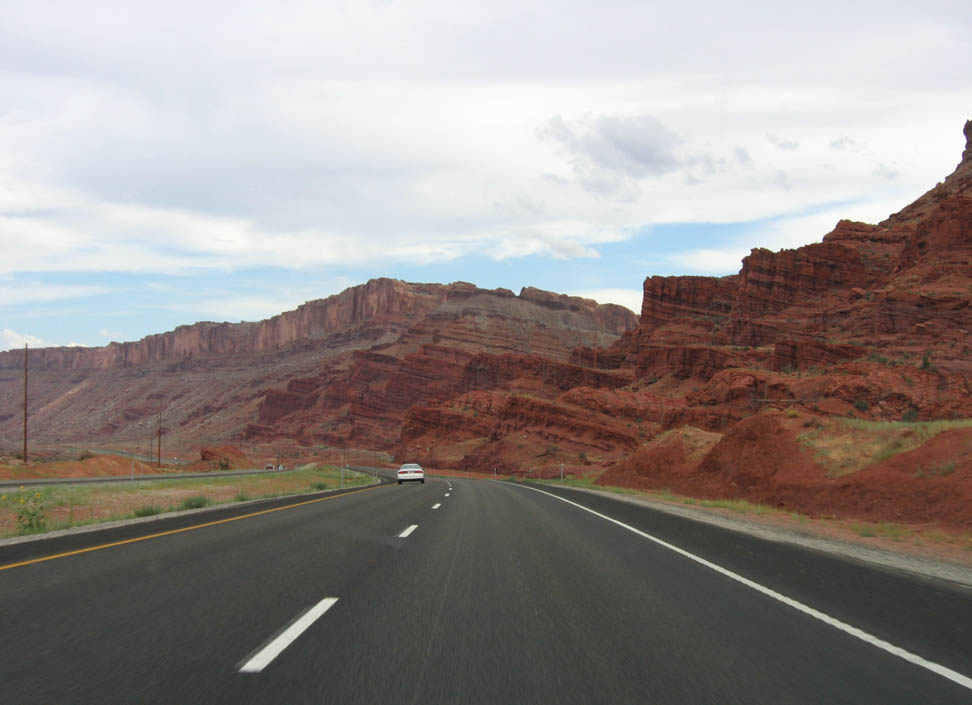
US-191 north of Moab

With the creation of the U.S. Highway system in 1926, SR-8 and SR-9 each received a second designation, US-50 and U.S. Route 450 respectively. The state legislature redefined all the state routes in 1927, and moved SR-8 to a direct Floy-Thompson cutoff, with both roads from Valley City to Floy and Thompson becoming SR-9. The Monticello-Bluff road was assigned State Route 47 and extended to Mexican Hat at that time and to the Arizona state line in 1931. The State Road Commission designated a new alignment of SR-9 to Crescent Junction on SR-8 in 1934, replacing both branches to Floy and Thompsons, and the legislature updated the description in 1935; at that time, US-450 was extended from Valley City to Crescent Junction on the new SR-8 (US-50) cutoff.

Although no significant changes were made to SR-9 or SR-47 after 1935, the signed U.S. Highway numbers changed several times. First, in the late 1930s, U.S. Route 160 replaced US-450, continuing to enter the state east of Monticello and end at Crescent Junction. Then in about 1970, US-163 was designated along the entire length of SR-47 from Arizona to Monticello, and replaced US-160 north to Crescent Junction; at the same time, US-666 was extended from Cortez, Colorado over US-160 to a new terminus at US-163 in Monticello. The 1977 renumbering saw the elimination of SR-9 and SR-47, by then no longer signed due to the concurrent U.S. Highway designations. The final change (except for the 2003 renumbering of US-666 to US-491) came in 1981 when US-191 replaced US-163 north of a junction near Bluff. South of this intersection, US-191 followed a route that did not formerly exist as a state highway. The Bureau of Indian Affairs (BIA) completed this road across the Navajo Nation, and San Juan County built the short piece north of the San Juan River, in time for the extension of US-191. After the BIA granted an easement to Utah for the road, formerly BIA Route N12 (23) 2&3, in 1988, it was added to the state highway system the next year.

=== US-6 to US-40 ===
US-191 replaced SR-33.

The road connecting Colton on SR-8 (US-50, now US-6) with SR-6 (US-40) in Duchesne became a state highway in 1910. The southwest end was moved from Colton to Castle Gate in 1912, and in 1927 it was numbered State Route 33. Few changes were made to the roadway, and in 1981 it became part of US-191.

=== US-40 to Wyoming ===
US-191 replaced part of SR-44 and all of SR-260.

The road from SR-6 (US-40) in Vernal north to SR-43 in Manila, where one could continue to Wyoming, was added to the state highway system in about 1918 as a forest highway project, completed in 1926, and numbered SR-44 in 1927. It was the only state road connecting Daggett County's seat, Manila, with the rest of the state, yet parts remained in an unimproved condition through the 1950s.

Several routes have been designated over the years to connect SR-44 to Flaming Gorge, a canyon on the Green River that lends its name to the Flaming Gorge Dam that US-191 now crosses the river on. The first was State Route 165, which would have begun at SR-44 south of Manila and headed east to the gorge. The state legislature added the proposed road to the state highway system in 1933, but in 1935 it was deleted, and the number was reused to the west on a portion of Birch Creek Road. Later, in 1941, the planned connection was redesignated as a state highway, this time State Route 220, but in 1945 it was moved north, closer to the state line.

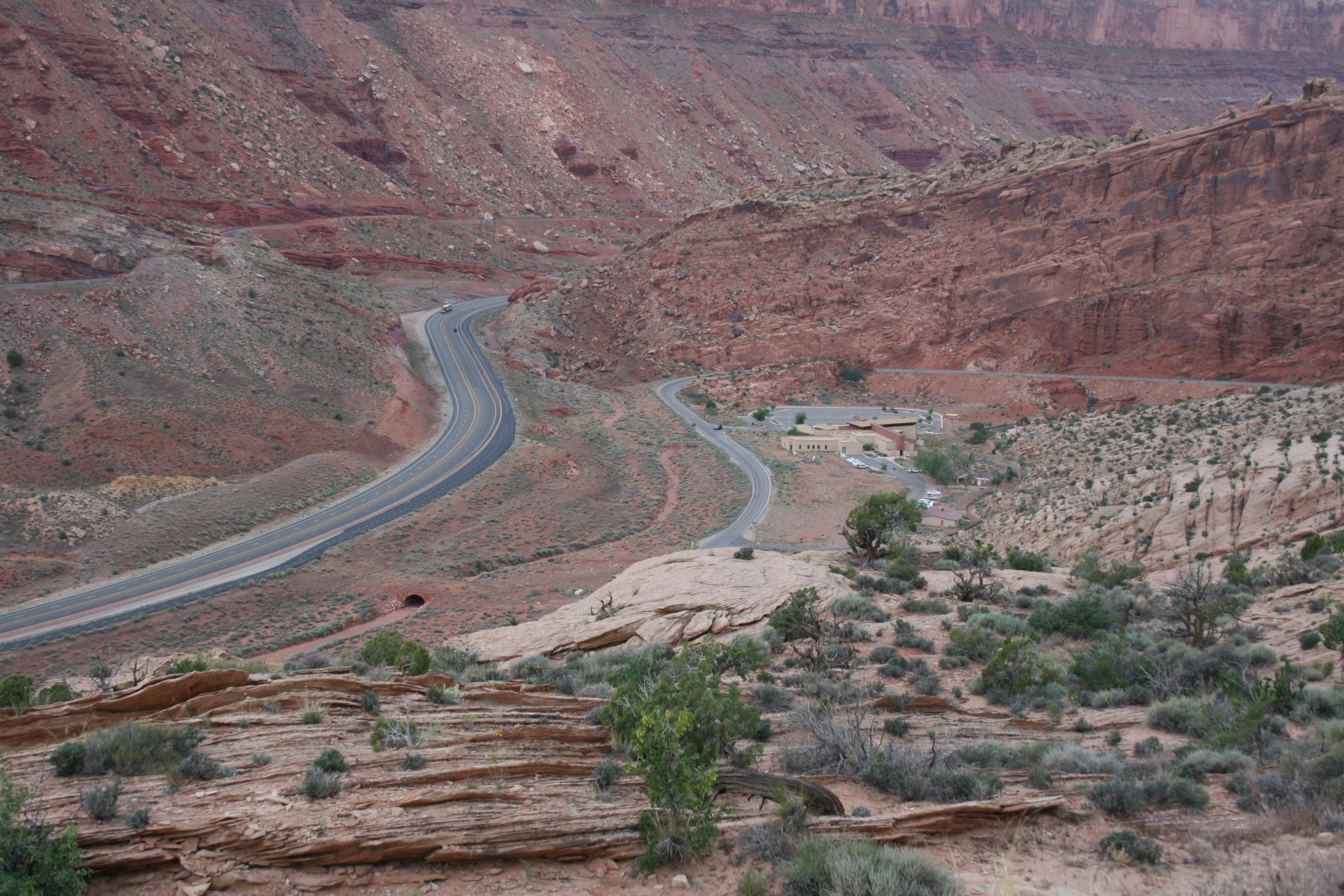
US 191 from the access road at Arches National Park.

It was this alignment that was actually built, beginning at Linwood on SR-43 and proceeding east-southeasterly through a valley that is now flooded by the Flaming Gorge Reservoir's Linwood Bay. SR-220 was deleted in 1957, but in its place was a new State Route 260 that began at Greendale Junction on SR-44 and headed northeast over the dam (then under construction) and to the state line. The legislature did not specify where it would intersect the border, and the State Road Commission initially routed it along former SR-220 to Linwood. However, the law was amended in 1963 to define the north end to be east of the reservoir, and soon the lake began to fill, cutting off the road to Linwood (and inundating that settlement). By 1981 the new road was completed, and most of SR-44 and all of SR-260 were absorbed by US-191.

== Major intersections ==
County	Location	mi	km	Exit	Destinations	Notes
Utah–Arizona line		0.000	0.000		US 191 / BIA Route 12 south – Mexican Water, Canyon de Chelly	Continuation into Arizona
San Juan		21.229	34.165		US 163 south – Mexican Hat, Monument Valley	
San Juan	Bluff	25.996	41.837		SR-162 east	
San Juan		36.438	58.641		SR-262	
San Juan		47.255	76.050		SR-95 – Blanding, Bluff	
San Juan	Monticello	71.857	115.643		US 491 south (Center Street) – Monticello Port of Entry, Cortez	Former US 160 east
San Juan		86.136	138.622		SR-211	
San Juan	La Sal Junction	103.446	166.480		SR-46	
Grand	Moab	128.180	206.286		SR-128	
Grand		129.798	208.890		SR-279	
Grand		136.733	220.050		SR-313	
Grand	Crescent Junction	157.193	252.978		I-70 / US 6 east (US-50 east) – Grand Junction	I-70 exit 182; south end of I-70/US-6/US-50 overlap
Grand				175	Floy	Exit numbers follow I-70
Grand				164	I-70 BL / SR-19 west – Green River	I-70 Bus. not signed southbound
Emery				160	I-70 BL / SR-19 east – Green River	I-70 Bus. not signed northbound
Emery					I-70 / US 50 west – Salina	I-70 exit 157; north end of I-70/US-50 overlap
Carbon	Sunnyside Junction				SR-123	
Carbon	Wellington				Nine Mile Canyon Road	Former SR-53
Carbon	Price			243	US 6 Bus. west (SR-55) – Price	Interchange; exit numbers based on US-6 mileage
Carbon	Price			241	SR-10 south (Carbon Avenue)	Interchange
Carbon	Price			240	US 6 Bus. east (SR-55) – Price	Interchange
Carbon					SR-139 north to SR-157 – Spring Glen	
Carbon	Helper				US 6 Bus. west / SR-157 (Poplar Street)	
Carbon	Helper			232	US 6 Bus. east (North Main Street)	Interchange
Carbon		251.434	404.644		US 6 west – Salt Lake City	North end of US-6 overlap
Duchesne	Duchesne	294.847	474.510		US 40 west (Main Street west)	Southern end of US-40 concurrency
Duchesne	Duchesne				SR-87 north – County Offices, Airport, Altamont	
Duchesne	Myton				Nine Mile Canyon Road	Former SR-53
Duchesne					SR-87 west – Ioka, Altamont	
Duchesne	Roosevelt				SR-121 west (200 North) – Neola	Counterclockwise terminus of SR-121; serves Uintah Basin Medical Center
Uintah					SR-88 south	
Uintah	Vernal				SR-121 north (500 West)	Clockwise terminus of SR-121
Uintah	Vernal	352.611	567.472		US 40 east (Main Street east)	North end of US-40 overlap
Uintah		358.169	576.417		SR-301	
Daggett	Greendale Junction	387.306	623.309		SR-44 – Manila	
Daggett		404.168	650.445		US 191 north – Rock Springs	Continuation into Wyoming; formerly Wyoming Highway 373
1.000 mi = 1.609 km; 1.000 km = 0.621 mi: Concurrency terminus

== See also ==
- List of U.S. Highways in Utah
- List of state highways in Utah

U.S. Route 191
Previous state: Arizona	Utah	Next state: Wyoming
