= Flaming Gorge =

Flaming Gorge can refer to:

- Flaming Gorge Dam, the dam in northeastern Utah, United States that forms the Flaming Gorge Reservoir
- Flaming Gorge National Recreation Area, a recreation area surrounding the Flaming Gorge Reservoir in northern eastern Utah and southwestern Wyoming in the Western United States
- Flaming Gorge Reservoir, the reservoir on the Green River in northern eastern Utah and southwestern Wyoming in the Western United States
- Flaming Gorge Valley, a valley in Daggett County, Utah, United States
- Flaming Gorge, Utah, a census-designated place in Daggett County, Utah, United States
