= Utah State Route 44 =

State highway in Utah, United States

State Route 44
- Flaming Gorge-Uintas Scenic Byway
- SR-44 highlighted in red

Route information
- Maintained by UDOT
- Length: 27.995 mi (45.054 km)
- Existed: 1927–present

Major junctions
- South end: US 191 at Greendale Junction
- North end: SR-43 in Manila

Location
- Country: United States
- State: Utah

Highway system
- Utah State Highway System; Interstate; US; State; Minor; Scenic
← SR-43	→ SR-45

State Route 44 (SR-44) is a state highway in the U.S. state of Utah that runs from US-191 at Greendale Junction, southwest of Dutch John, to SR-43 in Manila. The route spans 27.99 miles (45.05 km) as it straddles the southern and western border of the Flaming Gorge National Recreation Area, and, along with US-191 is part of the Flaming Gorge-Uintas Scenic Byway.

The highway was established in 1927, originally going from Manila to Greendale Junction and continuing south to Vernal. However, in 1981, the portion from Vernal to Greendale Junction was truncated in order to designate that road a part of US-191.

== Route description ==
The route begins at the junction of US-191 on the southern boundary of the Flaming Gorge National Recreation Area, southwest of Dutch John. From there, the route heads west, continuing to straddle the southern boundary of Flaming Gorge. The highway turns northwest, now fully entering the National Recreation Area. Past Sheep Creek Loop Road, the route begins a more unpredictable path with many twists and turns, though remaining in a general northwest direction. The route continues north, exits Flaming Gorge, and continues north for 4.5 miles (7.2 km) before terminating at SR-43 in Manila.

== History ==
The road from SR-6 (US-40) in Vernal north to SR-43 in Manila, where one could continue to Wyoming, was added to the state highway system in about 1918 as a forest highway project, completed in 1926, and numbered SR-44 in 1927. Two major realignments through the Ashley National Forest were made in 1966 and 1971, the first moving SR-44 to the northeast between a point south of Carter Creek and near Summit Springs, and the second moving it east between a point east of Summit Springs and Sheep Creek Gap. (The east–west road past Summit Springs was only a state highway between 1966 and 1971.) The final change was in 1981, when the part of SR-44 south of Greendale Junction was renumbered as part of US-191.

== Major intersections ==
The entire route is in Daggett County.

Location	mi	km	Destinations	Notes
Greendale Junction	0.000	0.000	US 191 – Vernal, Rock Springs	Southern terminus
Manila	27.995	45.054	SR-43 (Center Street)	Northern terminus
1.000 mi = 1.609 km; 1.000 km = 0.621 mi

== See also ==
- List of state highways in Utah
