= Utah State Route 43 =

State highway in Utah, United States

State Route 43

Route information
- Maintained by UDOT
- Length: 10.557 mi (16.990 km)
- Existed: As a state highway: since 1918; As SR-43: 1927–present

Major junctions
- West end: WYO 414 at the Wyoming state line near Manila
- SR-44 in Manila
- East end: WYO 530 at the Wyoming state line near Manila

Location
- Country: United States
- State: Utah

Highway system
- Utah State Highway System; Interstate; US; State; Minor; Scenic
← SR-42	→ SR-44

State Route 43 (SR-43) is a state highway in the U.S. state of Utah. Running for 10.6 miles (17.1 km), the highway is a Utah connection between Wyoming Highways 414 and 530 (where the routes both end at their southern terminus). While running east–west from border-to-border, the route passes through Manila.

The road became a state highway in 1918, and was assigned a number in 1927. In 1960, due to the construction of the Flaming Gorge Reservoir, a portion was realigned.

== Route description ==
The route begins at the Wyoming border southeast of McKinnon and continues south as a two-lane road before turning southeast. When it intersects Birch Creek Road, the route curves to the east. Before the junction of Bennion Lane southwest of Manila, the highway turns northeast to enter through the south side of Manila. After the route turns due east through town and exits the county seat of Daggett County before curving northeast again to terminate at the Wyoming border, where the road continues as Highway 530.

== History ==
The road running east–west through Manila, between Wyoming and Wyoming, became a state highway in 1918, and was numbered SR-43 in 1927. Due to the creation of the Flaming Gorge Reservoir, the east end was moved west in 1960 to bypass the now-flooded community of Linwood.

== Major intersections ==
The entire route is in Daggett County.

Location	mi	km	Destinations	Notes
	0.000	0.000	WYO 414 west – Mountain View	Continuation west into Wyoming
Manila	7.932	12.765	SR-44 (Main Street) – Vernal, Dutch John	
	10.557	16.990	WYO 530 north – Green River	Continuation north into Wyoming
1.000 mi = 1.609 km; 1.000 km = 0.621 mi
