= Greendale, Utah =

Ghost town in Dagget County, Utah, United States

- Ghost town
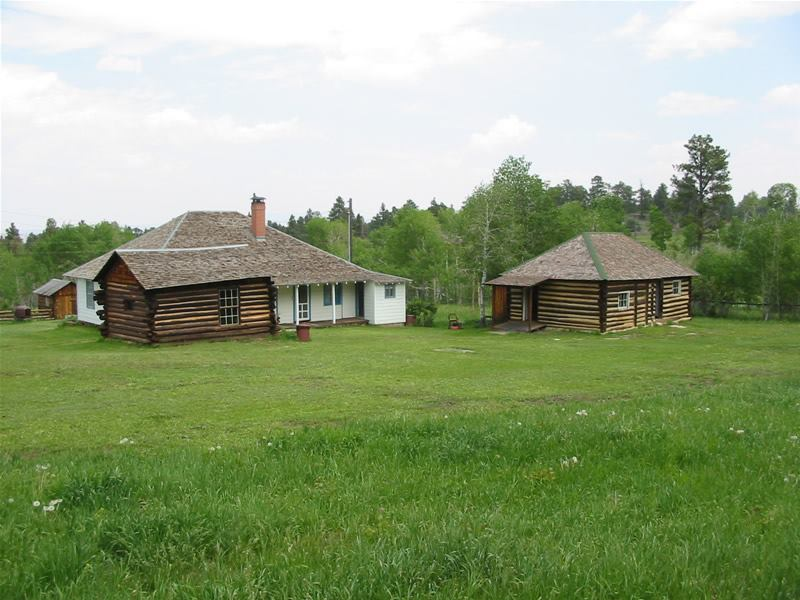
- Swett Ranch in Greendale, May 2017, a place listed on the National Register of Historic Places

- Location within Utah Location within the United States
- Coordinates: 40°53′N 109°29.5′W
- Country: United States
- State: Utah
- County: Daggett
- Founded: Early 1900s
- Abandoned: 1960s
- Elevation: 8,780 ft (2,676 m)
- GNIS feature ID: 1448444

Greendale was the community name given to a small ranching area in the Uinta Mountains of south-central Daggett County, Utah, United States.

== Description ==
During the early and mid twentieth century, the Greendale area was home to a small number of homestead families who primarily operated small cattle ranches in the remote and rugged terrain. Enough families lived in Greendale to support a one-room school in the 1920s and 1930s.

Major changes came to the Greendale area in the 1950s and 1960s, due to the construction of Flaming Gorge Dam nearby. The region received its first paved roads, and increasing land values helped encourage most of the ranch families to sell out. Today, some of the original homestead land is occupied by summer homes, while the former Oscar Swett ranch is maintained as an interpretive site by the United States Forest Service. The Swett Ranch is listed on the National Register of Historic Places.

A United States post office operated at Greendale during 1915 and 1916.

== See also ==
- List of ghost towns in Utah
