= Uintah Basin Medical Center =

- Uintah Basin Health Care

Geography
- Location: 250 West 300 North; Roosevelt, Utah, United States
- Coordinates: 40°18′15″N 109°59′45″W

Organisation
- Type: Community hospital

Services
- Emergency department: Level IV Trauma Center
- Beds: 42

History
- Founded: 1944

Links
- Website: Uintah Basin Health Care

The Uintah Basin Medical Center is a non-profit community hospital located in Roosevelt, Utah, United States of America.

== Description ==
The medical center is located at 250 West 300 North and serves the surrounding communities within Duchesne and Uintah counties. It is the flagship facility of Uintah Basin Healthcare (UBH), a non-profit 501(c)3 corporation. The medical center has 42 beds and is recognized as a Level IV Trauma Center. The medical center also has a heliport.

UBH is the largest rural healthcare system within Utah and has additional clinic locations in Altamont, Duchesne, Manila, Tabiona, and Vernal.

== History ==
The medical center was established in 1944 as the LDS Roosevelt Hospital, but when the Church of Jesus Christ of Latter-day Saints divested itself from its health care services in 1975, Duchesne County assumed ownership of the facility and it became known as Duchesne County Hospital. In 1993, the hospital was turned over to Uintah Basin Health Care, and the name was changed to the Uintah Basin Medical Center.

On 27 March 2014 Bradley LeBaron, who oversaw the transition to the non-profit corporation and had been the president and CEO of UBHC in the more than twenty years since, advised the Board of Trustees that he was leaving the organization to pursue another career opportunity with Brigham Young University's Student Health Services. His resignation was effective 1 June 2014. Brent Hales, who had been the CFO of UBHC for nearly seventeen years, was named the interim President and CEO.
