= Wilson Arch =

Natural arch in San Juan County, Utah, US

- Rock arch
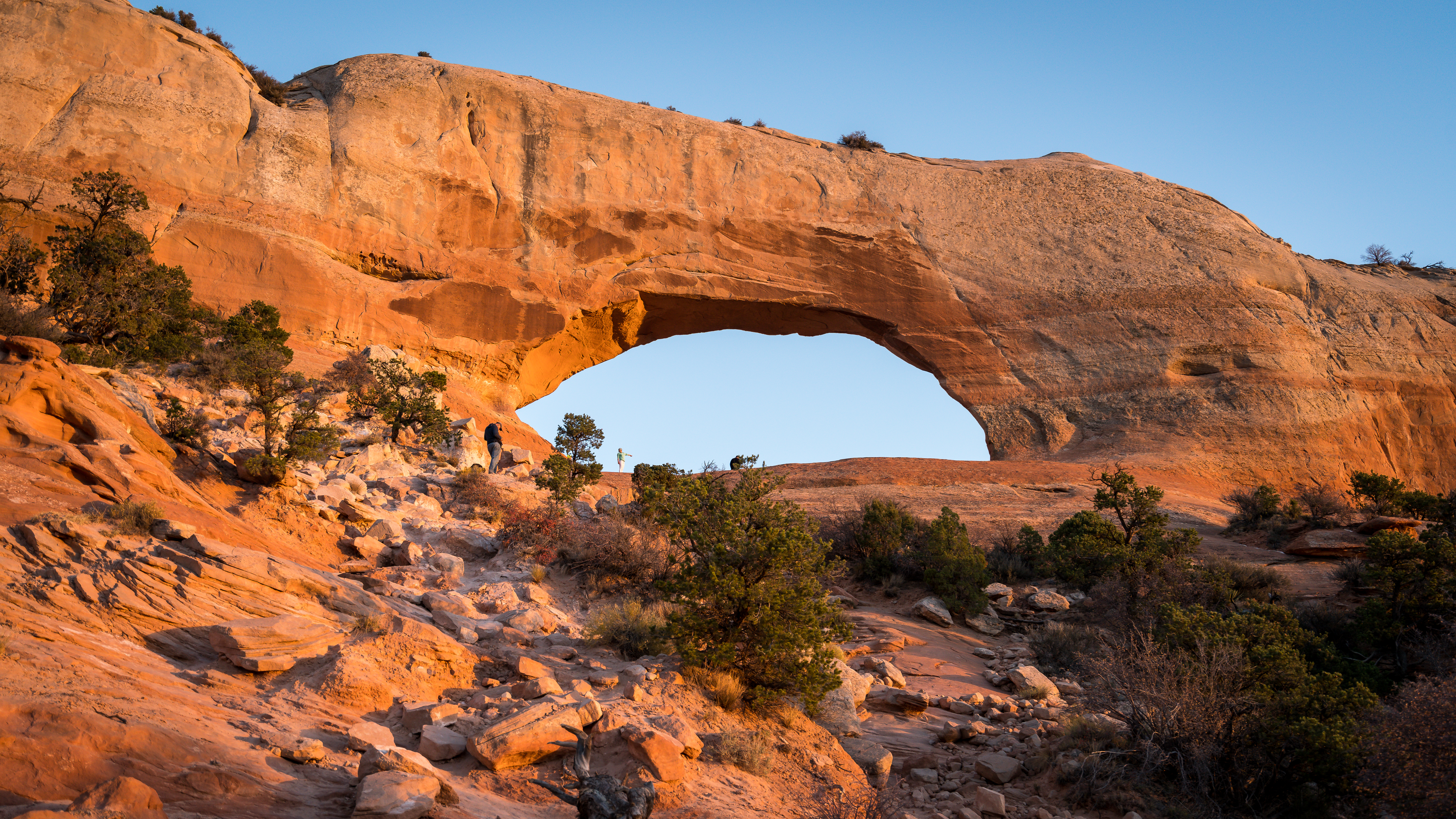
- View of Wilson Arch

- Location within Utah
- Coordinates: 38°16′21″N 109°22′16″W
- Location: La Sal Utah, United States

Dimensions
  - Width: 91 ft (28 m)
  - Height: 46 ft (14 m)
- Elevation: 6,175 ft (1,882 m)

Wilson Arch, also known as Wilson's Arch, is a natural sandstone arch in southeastern Utah, United States just off U.S. Route 191 located in San Juan County, 24 miles (39 km) south of Moab. It has a span of 91 feet (28 m) and height of 46 feet (14 m). It is visible from the road to the east where there are turnouts with interpretive signs. The elevation of Wilson Arch is 6,175 feet (1,882 m).

According to the sign at the pulloff near the arch:

Wilson Arch was named after Joe Wilson, a local pioneer who had a cabin nearby in Dry Valley. This formation is known as Entrada Sandstone. Over time superficial cracks, joints, and folds of these layers were saturated with water. Ice formed in the fissures, melted under extreme desert heat, and winds cleaned out the loose particles. A series of free-standing fins remained. Wind and water attacked these fins until, in some, cementing material gave way and chunks of rock tumbled out. Many damaged fins collapsed like the one to the right of Wilson Arch. Others, with the right degree of hardness survived despite their missing middles like Wilson Arch.
