= Bridgeport, Utah =

- Ghost town
- Location within Utah Location within the United States
- Coordinates: 40°54′10″N 109°08′55″W
- Country: United States
- State: Utah
- County: Daggett
- Founded: 1902
- Abandoned: 1940
- Elevation: 5,436 ft (1,657 m)
- GNIS feature ID: 1455194

Bridgeport was the community name given to a small ranching area in far eastern Daggett County, Utah, United States, near the Colorado border. The Bridgeport store, saloon and post office were located on the north side of the Green River near the mouth of Jesse Ewing Canyon, near the western end of Browns Park.

Bridgeport was developed and operated by Charley Crouse, an early Browns Park pioneer; a second store approximately two miles upstream was operated by John Jarvie. No trace of the Crouse buildings remains today, but the Jarvie store and farmstead is now listed on the National Register of Historic Places, and is maintained as an interpretive site by the Bureau of Land Management.

The United States post office at Bridgeport operated from 1902 to 1940.
