= Linwood, Utah =

Former town in Daggett County, Utah, United States

- Ghost town
- Location within Utah Location within the United States
- Coordinates: 40°59′41″N 109°38′46″W
- Country: United States
- State: Utah
- County: Daggett
- Founded: 1890s
- Abandoned: 1950s
- Elevation: 6,043 ft (1,842 m)
- GNIS feature ID: 1448598

Linwood was an unincorporated village in north-central Daggett County, Utah, United States, near the Wyoming state line.

== Description ==
The town, situated along Henrys Fork of the Green River, was approximately five miles east of the county seat of Manila and was first settled in the 1890s. The nearby bottomland was used for irrigated agriculture, and sheep ranches operated in the more arid lands to the north.

By the 1920s, the town of Linwood was in decline due to farm consolidation and road improvements that made larger communities more accessible to local residents. In the late 1950s, the federal government purchased the Linwood area as part of its land acquisition for the Flaming Gorge Reservoir project. The remaining buildings in Linwood were razed or moved, and the townsite is now underwater; no trace of the former community remains.

A United States post office operated at Linwood from 1903 to 1958.

== See also ==
- List of ghost towns in Utah
