= Ashley National Forest =

National Forest in Utah and Wyoming, United States

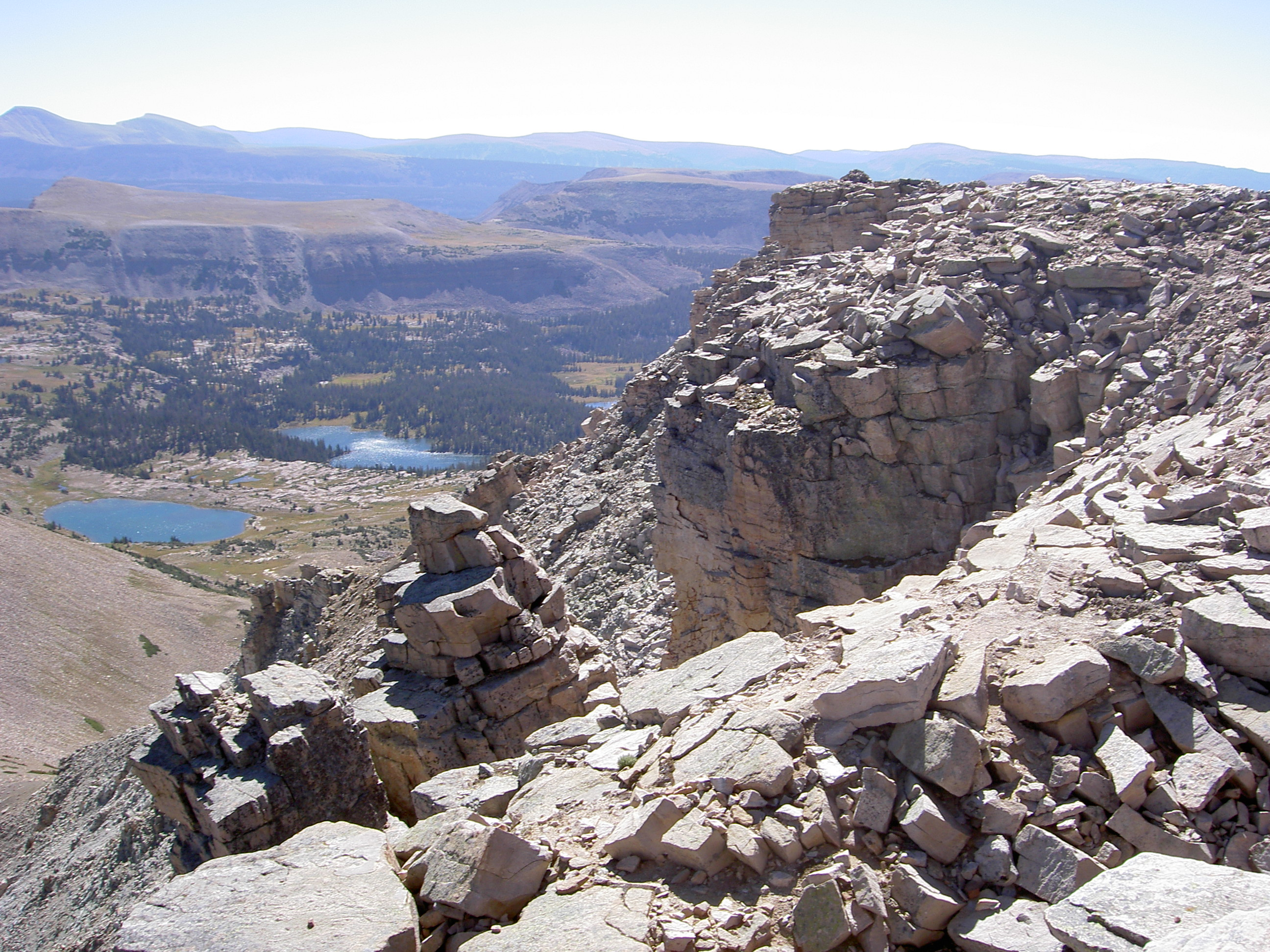
- Naturalist Basin in Ashley National Forest

- Location within the United States
- Location: Daggett, Duchesne, Summit, Uintah, and Utah counties, Utah, and Sweetwater County, Wyoming, United States
- Nearest city: Vernal, Utah
- Coordinates: 40°20′N 110°20′W
- Area: 1,382,346 acres (5,594.16 km^{2})
- Established: July 1, 1908
- Visitors: 1,400,000 (in 2006)
- Governing body: U.S. Forest Service
- Website: Ashley National Forest

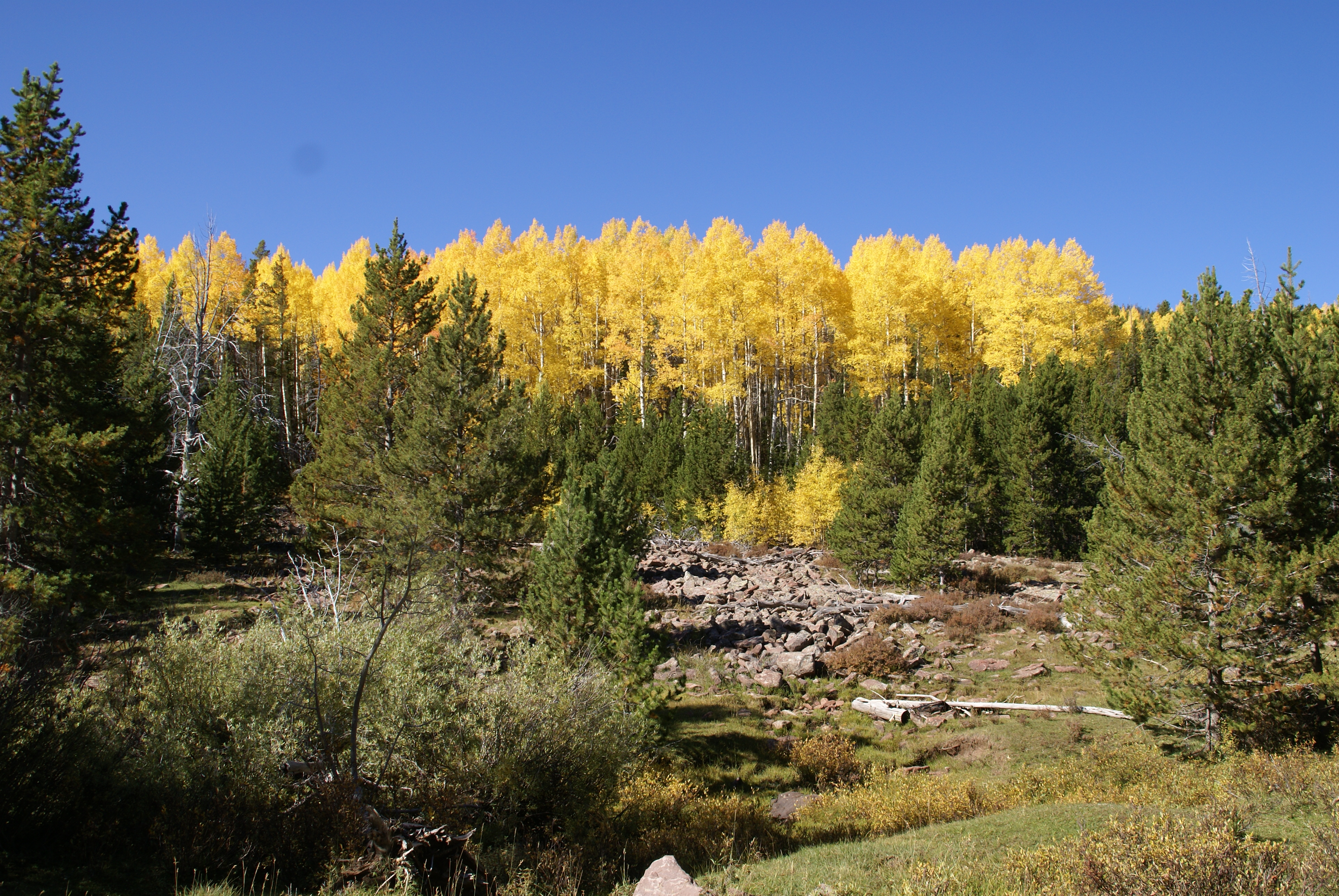
Quaking aspen in the Vernal Ranger District of the Ashley National Forest

Ashley National Forest is a national forest located in northeastern Utah and southwestern Wyoming in the United States. Within the Forest's bounds are 1,382,346 acres (5,594 km^{2}) (with 1,287,909 acres (5,212 km^{2}) in Utah and 96,223 acres (389 km^{2}) in Wyoming) of vast forests, lakes, and mountains, with elevations ranging from 6,000 to 13,500 feet (1,800 to 4,100 m). The forest covers portions of Daggett, Duchesne, Summit, Uintah, and Utah counties in Utah and Sweetwater County in Wyoming. Some of the most popular landmarks located in the forest include the Flaming Gorge National Recreation Area and the Uinta Mountains, which contains the highest mountain peak in Utah (Kings Peak). The forest also includes 276,175 acres (1,117.64 km^{2}), or about 60.5%, of the High Uintas Wilderness (with the rest being in the Wasatch–Cache National Forest). The headquarters for the Ashley National Forest are located in Vernal, Utah with ranger district offices in Vernal; Duchesne, Utah; Roosevelt, Utah; Manila, Utah; and Green River, Wyoming.

== History ==
Petroglyphs found throughout the forest suggest that the land had been hunted for centuries by native Americans before the arrival of Europeans. The first white men believed to have set foot in Ashley National Forest were the Spanish explorers Dominques and Escalante, in 1776. The forest, however, was not thoroughly explored until the early 19th century when General William Henry Ashley, an organizer of a fur company, began looking for an outlet to the Gulf of Mexico for his business. General Ashley and his team began making their way up the Green River (one of the many bodies of water located in the forest) in the spring of 1825. After passing through the Flaming Gorge, General Ashley was convinced by the native Americans to turn around and head back up the Uinta Mountains. During his exploration, General Ashley wrote and hung his name out over one of the rivers that he had explored, which now lies below the water of the Flaming Gorge Reservoir; this is how Ashley National Forest received its name. Many other explorers would come and explore the forest, and eventually the first settlement in Ashley National Forest was made in 1872. It was settled by Captain Pardon Dodds, who brought about 2,000 cattle into the Uintah Basin. In a few years, all of the surrounding ranges were completely stocked with cattle and horses.

On July 1, 1908, by executive order of President Theodore Roosevelt, Ashley National Forest was created. The general boundaries of the forest remained unchanged until 1953. Most of the north slope of the Uinta Mountains was transferred to the Wasatch National Forest, while Ashley National Forest received the Rock Creek and Duchesne River drainages. President Lyndon B. Johnson added approximately 120,000 acres (486 km^{2}) to the forest when he established the Flaming Gorge National Recreation Area as part of Ashley National Forest in 1968. Since then, there have only been slight boundary changes to the forest.

== Recreational activities ==
The forest contains four main byways to drive on, which take visitors through many different landmarks found in the forest and offers them a chance to see various forms of wildlife. For people who prefer to walk, the forest contains over 1,000 miles (1,600 km) of hiking trails. These trails cover the entire forest, taking hikers from extensive forests to rugged mountains. Many of these trails are designated for off-road vehicles as well, such as motorcycles, ATVs, and snowmobiles. Along the trails there are many campgrounds available to visitors. During the winter months, there are two facilities located in the forest called Yurts that provide cross-country skiers with overnight room rentals to escape the cold. There are also many lakes and rivers found throughout Ashley National Forest, which allows guests to take in some fishing while visiting. There are also some bodies of water in the forest that are designated for motorized water-crafts.

The John D. Dingell Jr. Conservation, Management, and Recreation Act created the Ashley Karst National Recreation and Geologic Area. It is 173,475 acres of karst landscape protecting the watershed in Uintah County.

== Uinta Mountains ==
Occupying a large piece of Ashley National Forest are the Uinta Mountains. With a main crest stretching more than 60 miles (97 km) and surrounded by massive secondary ridges extending north and south, this mountain range is the largest alpine area located in the Intermountain west. This mountain range also contains Kings Peak, the highest peak in Utah at 13,528 feet (4.123 km). Hundreds of lakes, streams, and meadows can be found within the many basins located in the mountain range. The Uinta Mountains are also the home to many different types of wildlife including, elk, moose, mule deer, coyotes, black bears, ptarmigan, several raptor species, beavers, marten, river otters, mountain goats, bighorn sheep, pronghorn, cougars, pikas, and marmots. The mountains also contain 16 designated trails (545 miles [877 km]) for visitors to explore from June to September.

== Flaming Gorge National Recreational Area ==
The Flaming Gorge National Recreation Area is a popular recreational feature located at the Flaming Gorge Reservoir within Ashley National Forest. It is in Flaming Gorge, a partially submerged canyon on the Green River. The National Recreation Area contains 207,363 acres (839 km^{2}) of both land and water, which is divided almost evenly in Utah and Wyoming. The canyon was named by explorer John Wesley Powell, who upon first looking at the red gorge believed that it was on fire.

In 1962 the Flaming Gorge Dam was completed, impounding the Green River to create the Flaming Gorge Reservoir. The reservoir is extremely popular for boaters, with five full-service marinas offering launching, storage, and maintenance facilities. Because the reservoir's water remains cool even in summer's extreme heat, it is popular with water sports enthusiasts. The reservoir and Green River upstream are known for supporting a large number of trout, which makes the recreational area a fishing destination. The river is also a river rafting destination. The recreational area has campgrounds and hiking trails along the 360 miles (580 km) of shoreline. There are also some secluded coves only accessible by boat.

== See also ==
- Uinta Highline Trail
- List of national forests of the United States
- Neola North Fire
