= Daggett County, Utah =

County in Utah, United States

- County
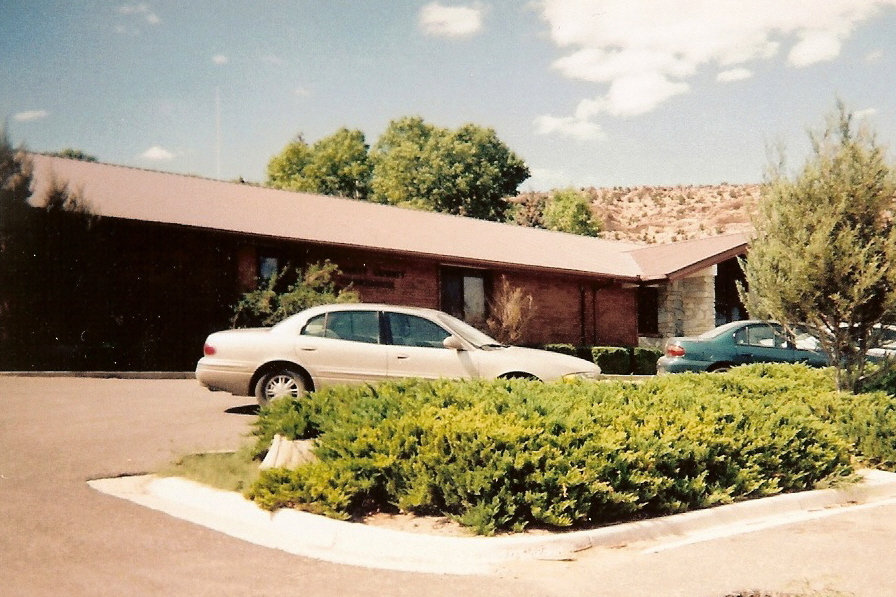
- Daggett County Courthouse in Manila, May 2008

- Location within the U.S. state of Utah
- Coordinates: 40.89°N 109.51°W
- Country: United States
- State: Utah
- Founded: January 7, 1918
- Named for: Ellsworth Daggett
- Seat: Manila
- Largest town: Manila

Area
  - Total: 721 sq mi (1,870 km^{2})
  - Land: 697 sq mi (1,810 km^{2})
  - Water: 24 sq mi (62 km^{2}) 3.3%

Population (2020)
  - Total: 935
  - Estimate (2025): 934
  - Density: 1.34/sq mi (0.518/km^{2})
- Time zone: UTC−7 (Mountain)
  - Summer (DST): UTC−6 (MDT)
- Congressional district: 3rd
- Website: www.daggettcounty.gov

Daggett County (/ˈdæɡət/ DAG-ət) is a county in the northeastern corner of the U.S. state of Utah. As of the 2020 United States Census, the population was 935, making it the least populous county in Utah. Its county seat is Manila. The county was named for Ellsworth Daggett (1845–1923), the first surveyor-general of Utah. The small community of Dutch John, located near the state line with Colorado and Wyoming, became an incorporated town in January 2016.

== History ==
Daggett County was originally the north portion of Uintah County. Due to mountainous terrain that was then impassable, people in what is now Daggett County during the 19th and early 20th Centuries had to a travel a circuitous route covering hundreds of miles by stagecoach and rail to conduct business in Vernal, the county seat, a mere 50 miles (80 km) away by direct straight-line measurements.

In the fall 1917 election, Uintah county voters voted to establish a separate county on the northern slope of the Uinta Mountains. The act establishing the county was approved on January 7, 1918, naming Manila as the county seat.

The boundary between Daggett and Uintah counties was adjusted in 1919, with some territory being returned to Uintah. Daggett County boundaries have remained unchanged since 1919.

== Geography ==
Daggett County lies at the lower northeastern corner of Utah. Its northern border abuts the south border of the state of Wyoming, and its eastern boundary abuts the western border of the state of Colorado. Its main geographical features are the Uinta Mountains, which comprise its southwestern portion and delineate part of its southern border, and the Green River, which has carved a deep gorge through the east-central part of the county. In 1958, the United States Bureau of Reclamation took advantage of this natural feature to construct the Flaming Gorge Dam, creating the Flaming Gorge Reservoir, which began filling in 1964.

The county terrain slopes to the north and east on the northern flank of the Uintas. The county's highest point is on a mountain crest along its south border, at 12,276 ft (3,742 m) ASL. The county has a total area of 721 square miles (1,870 km^{2}), of which 697 square miles (1,810 km^{2}) is land and 24 square miles (62 km^{2}) (3.3%) is water. It is the fourth-smallest county in Utah by area. Over 90% of the land of Daggett County is under federal ownership.

== Statistics ==
- Based on the margin by which President Trump won the 2024 General Election there, Daggett County is the 11th most politically conservative county in Utah.
- Daggett County is the least populated in Utah and the 32nd least populated of all 3,116 US Counties.
- Daggett County residents are the second least educated in Utah and the 85th least educated out of all 3,116 in the US.
- Daggett County residents are the third most likely in Utah to engage in excessive alcohol consumption while also being the 165th least likely nationwide.

=== Major highways ===
- U.S. Route 191
- Utah State Route 43
- Utah State Route 44
- Utah State Route 1364 (Browns Park Rd)

=== Adjacent counties ===
- Sweetwater County, Wyoming - north
- Moffat County, Colorado - east
- Uintah County - south
- Duchesne County - southwest
- Summit County - west

=== Protected areas ===
- Ashley National Forest (part)
- Browns Park Waterfowl Area
- Browns Park Waterfowl Management Area
- Clay Basin Wildlife Management Area
- Flaming Gorge National Recreation Area (part)
- Goslin Mountain Wildlife Management Area
- Indian Crossing Campground (BLM)
- Marshall Draw Wildlife Management Area
- Taylors Flat Wildlife Management Area

=== Lakes ===
- Big Springs
- Browne Lake
- Browns Park National Wildlife Refuge Reservoir
- Chokecherry Spring
- Cow Spring
- Daggett Lake
- Dowds Hole
- Dripping Spring
- East Grindstone Spring
- Fighting Spring
- Flaming Gorge Reservoir (part)
- Ford Spring
- Greens Lakes
  - Greens Lake
  - West Greens Lake
- Grindstone Spring
- Lamb Lakes
  - Bummer Lake
  - Ewe Lake
  - Lamb Lake
  - Mutton Lake
  - Ram Lake
- Long Park Reservoir
- Lower Potter Lake
- One Fish Lake
- Pollen Lake
- Potter Lake (Upper Potter Lake)
- Red Lake
- Serviceberry Spring
- Sheep Creek Lake
- Spirit Lake (part)
- Spitzenburg Spring
- Stove Lake
- Tepee Lakes
  - Lower Teepee Lake
  - Upper Teepee Lake
- Weyman Lakes
  - Anson Lake (Lower Anson Lake)
  - Candy Lake
  - Clear Lake
  - Hidden Lake
  - Penguin Lake
  - Sesame Lake
  - Upper Anson Lake
- Youngs Spring

== Demographics ==
Historical population
Census	Pop.	Note	%±
1920	400		—
1930	411		2.8%
1940	564		37.2%
1950	364		−35.5%
1960	1,164		219.8%
1970	666		−42.8%
1980	769		15.5%
1990	690		−10.3%
2000	921		33.5%
2010	1,059		15.0%
2020	935		−11.7%
2025 (est.)	934	Steady	−0.1%
US Decennial Census; 1790–1960 1900–1990; 1990–2000 2010–2018 2020

=== Racial and ethnic composition ===
Daggett County, Utah – Racial and ethnic composition Note: the US Census treats Hispanic/Latino as an ethnic category. This table excludes Latinos from the racial categories and assigns them to a separate category. Hispanics/Latinos may be of any race.
Race / Ethnicity (NH = Non-Hispanic)	Pop 1980	Pop 1990	Pop 2000	Pop 2010	Pop 2020	% 1980	% 1990	% 2000	% 2010	% 2020
White alone (NH)	754	665	853	1,000	881	98.05%	96.38%	92.62%	94.43%	94.22%
Black or African American alone (NH)	0	0	4	4	1	0.00%	0.00%	0.43%	0.38%	0.11%
Native American or Alaska Native alone (NH)	1	6	7	7	0	0.13%	0.87%	0.76%	0.66%	0.00%
Asian alone (NH)	1	4	1	4	1	0.13%	0.58%	0.11%	0.38%	0.11%
Native Hawaiian or Pacific Islander alone (NH)	x	x	0	1	2	x	x	0.00%	0.09%	0.21%
Other race alone (NH)	0	0	0	2	2	0.00%	0.00%	0.00%	0.19%	0.21%
Mixed race or Multiracial (NH)	x	x	9	8	19	x	x	0.98%	0.76%	2.03%
Hispanic or Latino (any race)	13	15	47	33	29	1.69%	2.17%	5.10%	3.12%	3.10%
Total	769	690	921	1,059	935	100.00%	100.00%	100.00%	100.00%	100.00%

=== 2020 census ===
According to the 2020 United States census and 2020 American Community Survey, there were 935 people in Daggett County with a population density of 1.3 people per square mile (0.5/km^{2}). Among non-Hispanic or Latino people, the racial makeup was 881 (94.2%) White, 1 (0.1%) African American, 0 (0.0%) Native American, 1 (0.1%) Asian, 2 (0.2%) Pacific Islander, 2 (0.2%) from other races, and 19 (2.0%) from two or more races. 29 (3.1%) people were Hispanic or Latino.

There were 510 (54.55%) males and 425 (45.45%) females, and the population distribution by age was 219 (23.4%) under the age of 18, 455 (48.7%) from 18 to 64, and 261 (27.9%) who were at least 65 years old. The median age was 47.6 years.

There were 392 households in Daggett County with an average size of 2.39 of which 282 (71.9%) were families and 110 (28.1%) were non-families. Among all families, 227 (57.9%) were married couples, 29 (7.4%) were male householders with no spouse, and 26 (6.6%) were female householders with no spouse. Among all non-families, 99 (25.3%) were a single person living alone and 11 (2.8%) were two or more people living together. 115 (29.3%) of all households had children under the age of 18. 323 (82.4%) of households were owner-occupied while 69 (17.6%) were renter-occupied.

The median income for a Daggett County household was $74,911 and the median family income was $100,833, with a per-capita income of $27,568. The median income for males that were full-time employees was $69,375 and for females $35,313. 3.3% of the population and 0.0% of families were below the poverty line.

In terms of education attainment, out of the 381 people in Daggett County 25 years or older, 15 (3.9%) had not completed high school, 162 (42.5%) had a high school diploma or equivalency, 148 (38.8%) had some college or associate degree, 39 (10.2%) had a bachelor's degree, and 17 (4.5%) had a graduate or professional degree.

=== Ancestry ===
As of 2016, the largest self-reported ancestry groups in Daggett County, Utah, were:

- 35.4% were of English ancestry
- 9.2% were of Scots-Irish ancestry
- 8.8% were of German ancestry
- 8.3% were of Irish ancestry
- 7.9% were of American ancestry
- 7.2% were of Dutch ancestry
- 5.5% were of Danish ancestry.
- 3.3% were of Swedish ancestry
- 2.5% were of Scottish ancestry
- 2.1% were of Italian ancestry
- 1.6% were of Swiss ancestry
- 1.6% were of French ancestry
- 1.5% were of Norwegian ancestry
- 0.7% were of Polish ancestry

== Politics and government ==
Daggett County is governed by three commissioners, an auditor/HR director, a recorder/treasurer, a clerk, an assessor, and a sheriff, all elected for four-year terms in partisan elections. Judges stand for a non-partisan retention election every four years. Current officeholders and the year the current term began:

- Commission Chairman: Matt Tippets (R) 2022
- Commissioner: Randy Asay (R) 2020
- Commissioner: Jack Lytle (R) 2022
- Auditor/HR Director: Keri Pallesen (R) 2022
- Recorder/Treasurer: Brianne Carter (R) 2020
- Clerk: Brian Raymond (R) 2020
- Assessor: Lesa Asay (R) 2020
- Sheriff: Eric L. Bailey (R) 2022
- Justice Court Judge: Judge Jeri Allphin (appointed 2022)

Daggett County has traditionally voted Republican. In no national election since 1964 has the county selected the Democratic Party candidate (as of 2024).

State elected offices
Position	District	Name	Affiliation	First elected
Senate	26	Ronald Winterton	Republican	2018
House of Representatives	53	Kera Birkeland	Republican	2020
Board of Education	12	James Moss Jr.	Republican	2020

United States presidential election results for Daggett County, Utah
Year	Republican		Democratic		Third party(ies)	
Year	No.	%	No.	%	No.	%
1920	94	73.44%	32	25.00%	2	1.56%
1924	97	74.05%	26	19.85%	8	6.11%
1928	107	77.54%	31	22.46%	0	0.00%
1932	90	52.94%	79	46.47%	1	0.59%
1936	78	37.50%	128	61.54%	2	0.96%
1940	96	37.50%	160	62.50%	0	0.00%
1944	75	43.35%	98	56.65%	0	0.00%
1948	69	41.82%	95	57.58%	1	0.61%
1952	90	51.14%	86	48.86%	0	0.00%
1956	102	53.13%	90	46.88%	0	0.00%
1960	196	44.95%	239	54.82%	1	0.23%
1964	112	39.72%	170	60.28%	0	0.00%
1968	152	52.23%	97	33.33%	42	14.43%
1972	204	72.86%	50	17.86%	26	9.29%
1976	217	59.45%	131	35.89%	17	4.66%
1980	290	69.88%	109	26.27%	16	3.86%
1984	296	56.38%	227	43.24%	2	0.38%
1988	272	66.02%	132	32.04%	8	1.94%
1992	172	38.91%	122	27.60%	148	33.48%
1996	237	55.63%	131	30.75%	58	13.62%
2000	317	72.87%	104	23.91%	14	3.22%
2004	380	76.15%	108	21.64%	11	2.20%
2008	297	66.89%	131	29.50%	16	3.60%
2012	406	78.08%	94	18.08%	20	3.85%
2016	331	69.39%	77	16.14%	69	14.47%
2020	496	80.13%	111	17.93%	12	1.94%
2024	443	80.55%	101	18.36%	6	1.09%

== Commerce and transportation ==
The few commercial establishments in Daggett County exist to service tourists and users of the Flaming Gorge National Recreation Area. Throughout the county, there is one small general store, several gas stations, five cafes or restaurants, five inns/motels, and a few miscellaneous businesses that offer raft rentals. Some businesses offer guided fishing trips on the Flaming Gorge Reservoir and the Green River. The economy is primarily related to recreation, management of government land, and ranching. There are no railroads within Daggett County.

Map of Daggett County communities

== Communities ==
=== Towns ===
- Dutch John
- Manila (county seat)

=== Census-designated places ===
- Flaming Gorge

=== Former communities ===
- Bridgeport
- Greendale
- Linwood

== Education ==
There is one school district in the county: Daggett School District.

== See also ==
- List of counties in Utah
- National Register of Historic Places listings in Daggett County, Utah
- USS Daggett County (LST-689)
