= Manila, Utah =

Town in Daggett County, Utah, United States

- Town
- Location in Daggett County and the state of Utah

- Location of Utah in the United States
- Coordinates: 40°59′32″N 109°43′16″W
- Country: United States
- State: Utah
- County: Daggett
- Founded: 1898
- Incorporated: 1936
- Named for: Manila

Area
  - Total: 1.03 sq mi (2.68 km^{2})
  - Land: 1.03 sq mi (2.68 km^{2})
  - Water: 0 sq mi (0.00 km^{2})
- Elevation: 6,368 ft (1,941 m)

Population (2020)
  - Total: 308
  - Density: 297/sq mi (114.5/km^{2})
- Time zone: UTC−7 (Mountain (MST))
  - Summer (DST): UTC−6 (MDT)
- ZIP code: 84046
- Area code: 435
- FIPS code: 49-47620
- GNIS feature ID: 2412942
- Website: manilautah.gov

Manila is a small town located on the northern edge of Daggett County, Utah, United States, just south of the Wyoming border. The town is at the junction of State Route 43 and State Route 44, and is the county seat of Daggett County. Nearby sites include the Flaming Gorge National Recreation Area and the Flaming Gorge Reservoir just east of town, and to the south is Ashley National Forest, which includes Kings Peak (13,528 ft), the highest point in Utah.

The population of Manila was 308 at the 2020 census. The settlement was named in 1898, commemorating the American naval victory at the Battle of Manila Bay in the Philippines.

== Geography and climate ==
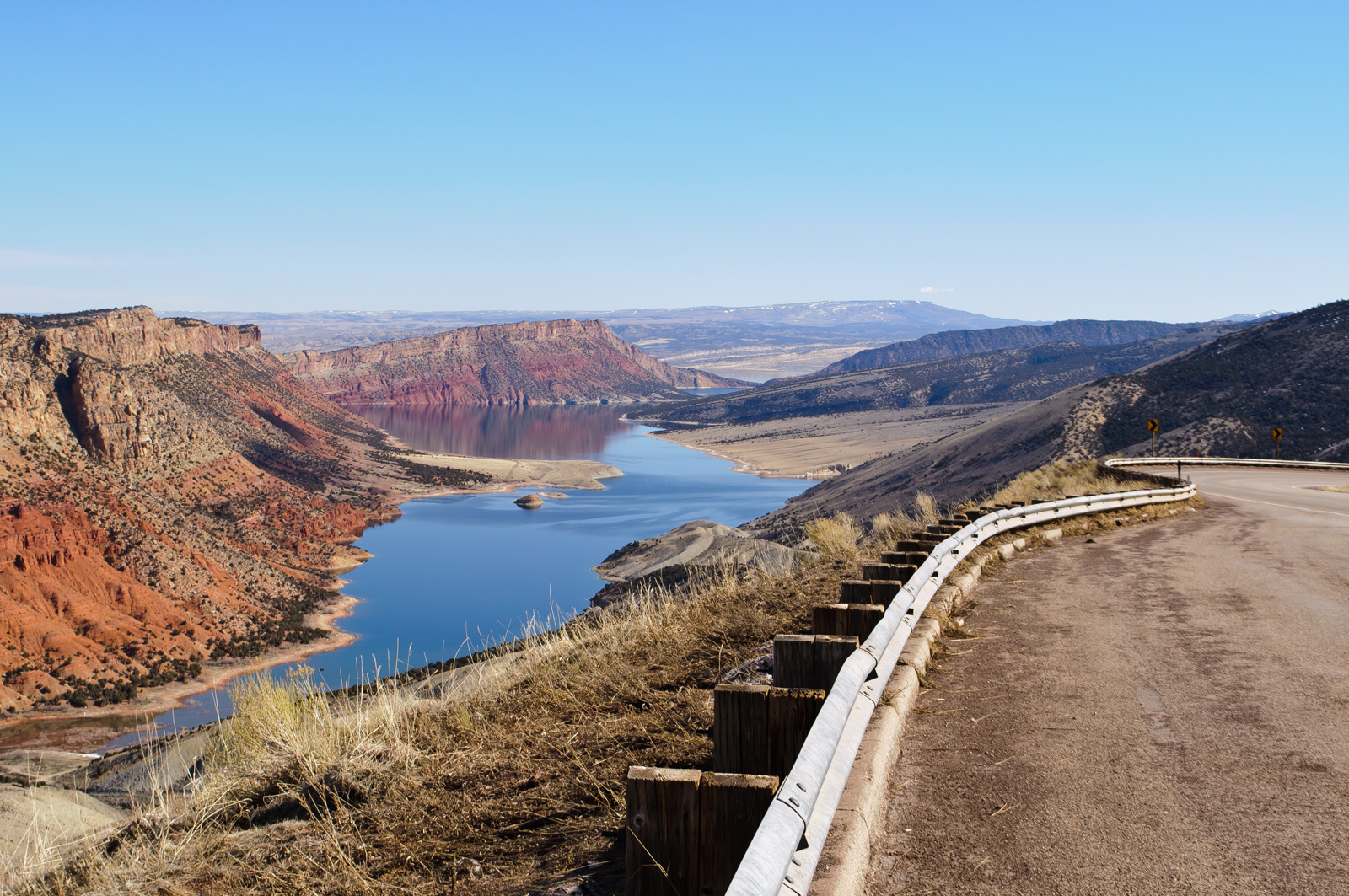
Flaming Gorge National Recreation Area south of Manila

Manila is located in northeastern Utah, north of the Uinta Mountains and west of the Flaming Gorge Reservoir on the Green River. The northern border of the town is the Wyoming state line.

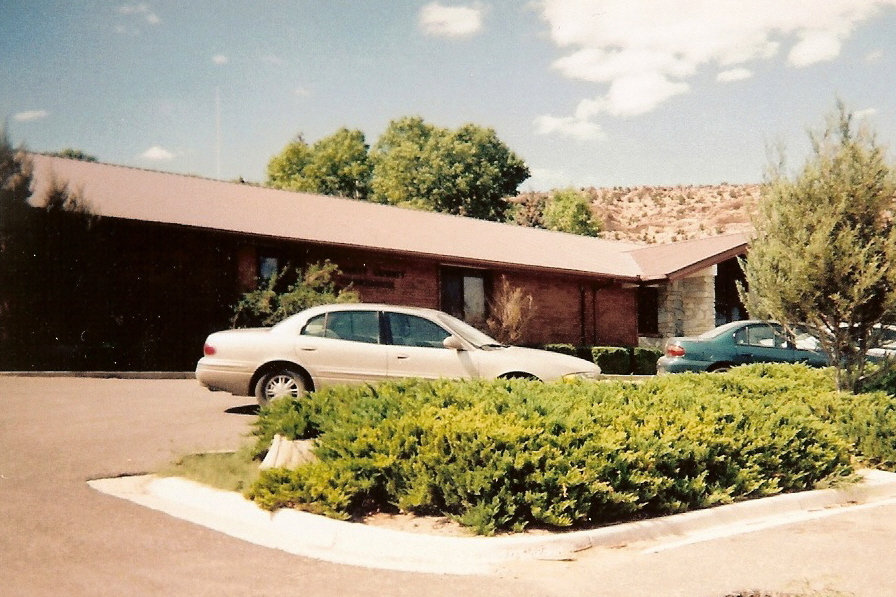
Daggett County courthouse in Manila

Map of the city limits and surrounding area

Manila has five streets which run east to west. The southernmost, and main east-west street, is Utah State Route 43, with the remaining four streets numbered sequentially south to north (1st through 4th Street). The primary north-south street is Main Street, and subsequent north-south streets in Manila are also numbered, with 1st East Street through 5th East Street to the east and 1st and 2nd West Street to the west. State Route 43 runs northeast 2.5 miles (4.0 km) to the Wyoming border, whereupon Wyoming Highway 530 continues north 44 miles (71 km) to the city of Green River. In the other direction from Manila, Route 43 leads west then north 8 miles (13 km) to the Wyoming border, beyond which Wyoming Highway 414 leads 45 miles (72 km) to Fort Bridger. Utah State Route 44 (Main Street) leads south then east from Manila 28 miles (45 km) to U.S. Route 191 near Red Canyon.

According to the United States Census Bureau, Manila has a total area of 0.89 square miles (2.3 km^{2}), all land.

=== Climate ===
Manila has a cold semi-arid climate (Köppen BSk).

Climate data for Manila, Utah, 1991–2020 normals, extremes 1911–present
| Month | Jan | Feb | Mar | Apr | May | Jun | Jul | Aug | Sep | Oct | Nov | Dec | Year |
|---|---|---|---|---|---|---|---|---|---|---|---|---|---|
| Record high °F (°C) | 66 (19) | 67 (19) | 73 (23) | 84 (29) | 94 (34) | 98 (37) | 102 (39) | 97 (36) | 96 (36) | 98 (37) | 76 (24) | 65 (18) | 102 (39) |
| Mean maximum °F (°C) | 49.7 (9.8) | 54.7 (12.6) | 64.5 (18.1) | 73.1 (22.8) | 80.8 (27.1) | 87.8 (31.0) | 91.3 (32.9) | 89.3 (31.8) | 83.9 (28.8) | 74.7 (23.7) | 63.4 (17.4) | 52.9 (11.6) | 91.8 (33.2) |
| Mean daily maximum °F (°C) | 35.5 (1.9) | 38.8 (3.8) | 49.1 (9.5) | 55.5 (13.1) | 65.3 (18.5) | 75.9 (24.4) | 82.5 (28.1) | 80.7 (27.1) | 71.6 (22.0) | 59.7 (15.4) | 45.4 (7.4) | 34.1 (1.2) | 57.8 (14.4) |
| Daily mean °F (°C) | 23.8 (−4.6) | 26.8 (−2.9) | 36.3 (2.4) | 42.9 (6.1) | 52.0 (11.1) | 60.8 (16.0) | 68.2 (20.1) | 65.9 (18.8) | 57.3 (14.1) | 45.7 (7.6) | 33.3 (0.7) | 23.8 (−4.6) | 44.7 (7.1) |
| Mean daily minimum °F (°C) | 12.0 (−11.1) | 14.9 (−9.5) | 23.6 (−4.7) | 30.3 (−0.9) | 38.6 (3.7) | 45.7 (7.6) | 53.8 (12.1) | 51.1 (10.6) | 43.0 (6.1) | 31.6 (−0.2) | 21.2 (−6.0) | 13.6 (−10.2) | 31.6 (−0.2) |
| Mean minimum °F (°C) | −5.2 (−20.7) | −4.7 (−20.4) | 8.4 (−13.1) | 16.1 (−8.8) | 23.9 (−4.5) | 33.7 (0.9) | 45.3 (7.4) | 42.4 (5.8) | 30.9 (−0.6) | 16.1 (−8.8) | 5.0 (−15.0) | −5.0 (−20.6) | −12.0 (−24.4) |
| Record low °F (°C) | −33 (−36) | −33 (−36) | −20 (−29) | −6 (−21) | 12 (−11) | 20 (−7) | 20 (−7) | 27 (−3) | 18 (−8) | −10 (−23) | −20 (−29) | −28 (−33) | −33 (−36) |
| Average precipitation inches (mm) | 0.51 (13) | 0.55 (14) | 0.55 (14) | 1.02 (26) | 1.56 (40) | 1.19 (30) | 1.08 (27) | 1.32 (34) | 1.04 (26) | 1.53 (39) | 0.53 (13) | 0.58 (15) | 11.46 (291) |
| Average snowfall inches (cm) | 4.2 (11) | 6.4 (16) | 10.2 (26) | 5.9 (15) | 1.7 (4.3) | 0.0 (0.0) | 0.0 (0.0) | 0.0 (0.0) | 0.4 (1.0) | 1.2 (3.0) | 2.5 (6.4) | 5.1 (13) | 37.6 (95.7) |
| Average extreme snow depth inches (cm) | 3.8 (9.7) | 4.1 (10) | 4.0 (10) | 1.6 (4.1) | 0.9 (2.3) | 0.1 (0.25) | 0.0 (0.0) | 0.0 (0.0) | 0.0 (0.0) | 1.9 (4.8) | 1.3 (3.3) | 4.8 (12) | 6.7 (17) |
| Average precipitation days (≥ 0.01 in) | 2.4 | 2.8 | 5.0 | 4.3 | 4.6 | 4.8 | 6.9 | 6.0 | 5.2 | 4.2 | 2.4 | 2.8 | 51.4 |
| Average snowy days (≥ 0.1 in) | 2.5 | 2.9 | 4.2 | 1.6 | 0.3 | 0.0 | 0.0 | 0.0 | 0.1 | 0.7 | 1.9 | 2.8 | 17.0 |
Source 1: NOAA (precip days, snow/snow days 1981–2010)
Source 2: National Weather Service

== Demographics ==
Historical population
| Census | Pop. | Note | %± |
|---|---|---|---|
| 1910 | 196 | | — |
| 1920 | 212 | | 8.2% |
| 1930 | 256 | | 20.8% |
| 1950 | 147 | | — |
| 1960 | 329 | | 123.8% |
| 1970 | 226 | | −31.3% |
| 1980 | 272 | | 20.4% |
| 1990 | 207 | | −23.9% |
| 2000 | 308 | | 48.8% |
| 2010 | 310 | | 0.6% |
| 2020 | 308 | | −0.6% |
U.S. Decennial Census

As of the census of 2000, there were 308 people, 105 households, and 66 families residing in the town. The population density was 379.3 people per square mile (146.8/km^{2}). There were 401 housing units at an average density of 493.9 per square mile (191.1/km^{2}). The racial makeup of the town was 91.56% White, 1.95% African American, 0.97% Native American, 4.55% from other races, and 0.97% from two or more races. Hispanic or Latino of any race were 9.09% of the population.

There were 105 households, out of which 21.0% had children under the age of 18 living with them, 51.4% were married couples living together, 6.7% had a female householder with no husband present, and 37.1% were non-families. 34.3% of all households were made up of individuals, and 11.4% had someone living alone who was 65 years of age or older. The average household size was 2.20 and the average family size was 2.83.

In the town, the population was spread out, with 15.9% under the age of 18, 11.7% from 18 to 24, 28.9% from 25 to 44, 27.3% from 45 to 64, and 16.2% who were 65 years of age or older. The median age was 40 years. For every 100 females, there were 170.2 males. For every 100 females age 18 and over, there were 194.3 males.

The median income for a household in the town was $26,458, and the median income for a family was $28,250. Males had a median income of $23,333 versus $15,833 for females. The per capita income for the town was $12,184. About 5.5% of families and 6.2% of the population were below the poverty line, including 9.3% of those under the age of 18 and 4.2% of those 65 or over.

== See also ==
- List of municipalities in Utah
