= Flaming Gorge Reservoir =

Reservoir in Wyoming and Utah, USA

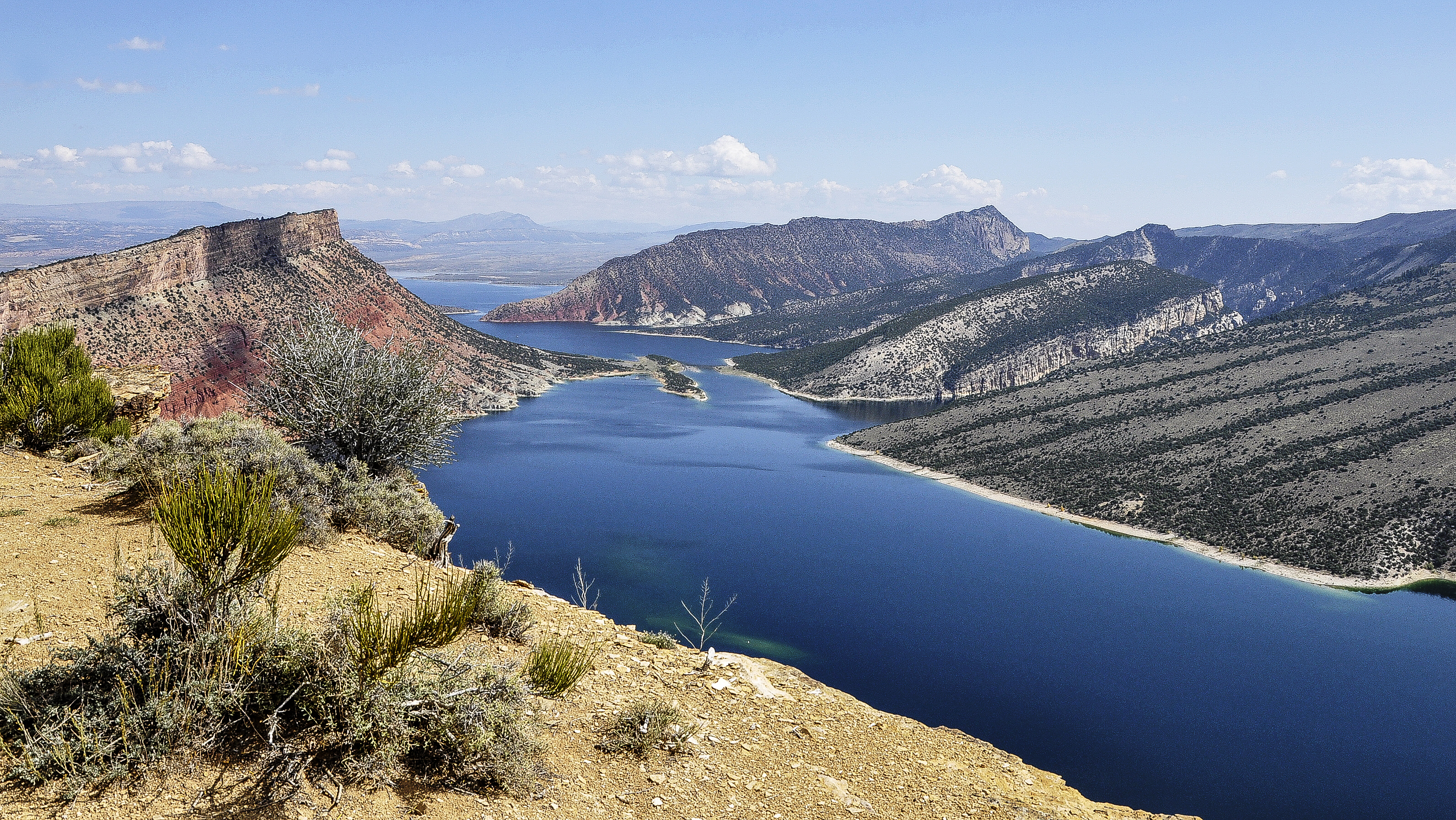
- Flaming Gorge Reservoir in Utah

- Location within Wyoming Location within Utah Location within the United States
- Location: Sweetwater County, Wyoming / Daggett County, Utah, US
- Coordinates: 41°09′41″N 109°33′04″W
- Lake type: Hydroelectric reservoir
- Primary inflows: Green River Blacks Fork Henrys Fork
- Primary outflows: Green River
- Catchment area: 39,100 km^{2} (15,100 sq. miles)
- Basin countries: United States
- Surface area: 42,020 acres (170 km^{2})
- Water volume: 3,788,900 acre⋅ft (4.6735 km^{3})
- Surface elevation: 6,040 ft (1,840 m)
- Settlements: Manila, Utah; Dutch John, Utah; Green River, Wyoming

Flaming Gorge Reservoir is the largest reservoir in Wyoming, on the Green River, impounded behind the Flaming Gorge Dam. Construction on the dam began in 1958 and was completed in 1964. The reservoir stores 3,788,900 acre-feet (4.6735×10^{9} m^{3}) of water when measured at an elevation of 6,040 feet (1,841 m) above sea-level (maximum).

== Location ==
The reservoir is mainly in southwest Wyoming and partially in northeastern Utah. The northern tip of the reservoir is 10 miles (16 km) southeast of Green River, Wyoming and 14 miles (23 km) southwest of Rock Springs, and the southern tip is approximately 40 miles (64 km) north of Vernal, Utah. The lake straddles the Utah-Wyoming border. The nearby town of Dutch John, Utah, was built to serve as a base camp during construction of the dam, and as an administrative site afterwards.

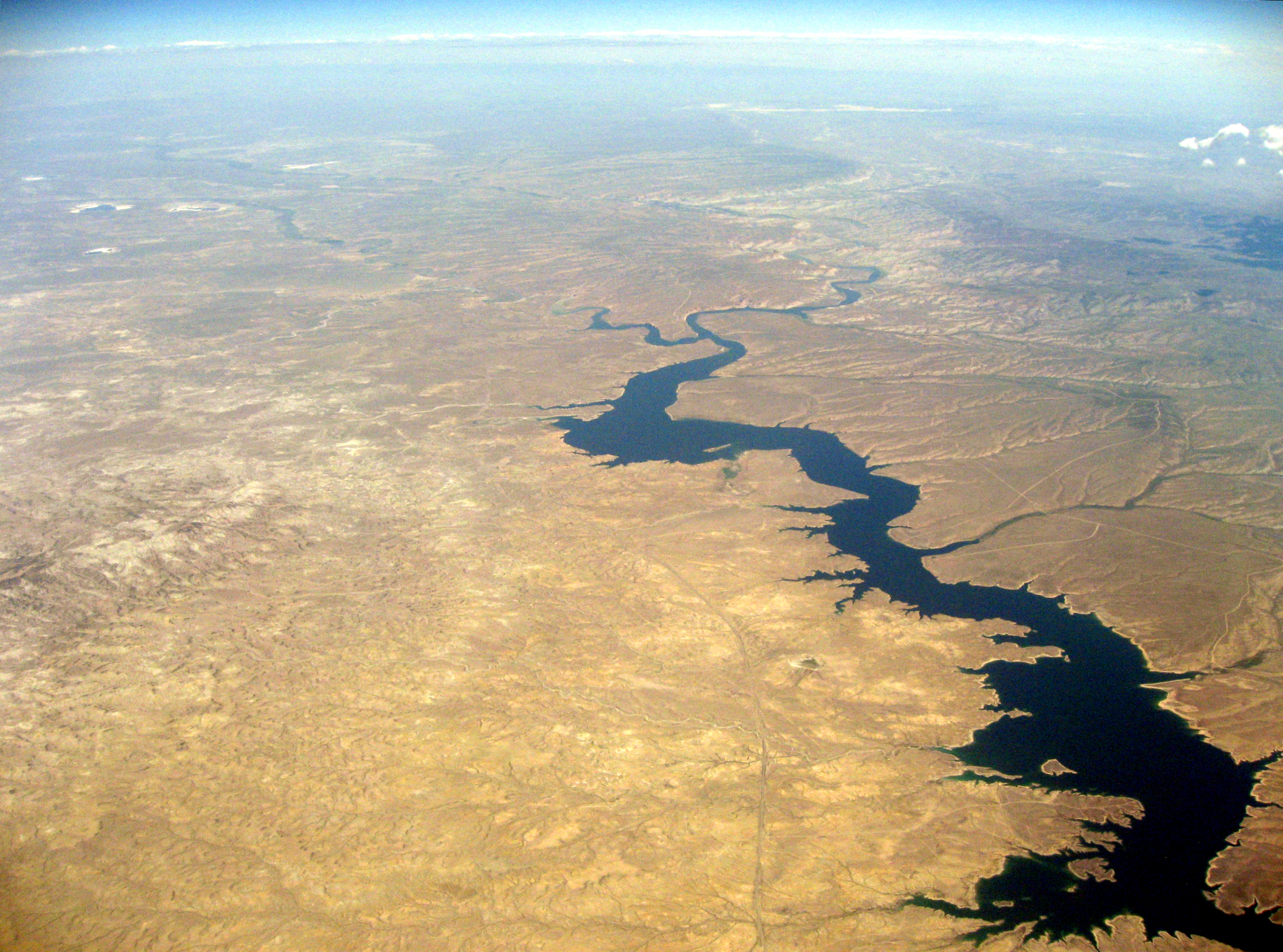
Aerial view of Flaming Gorge Reservoir in Wyoming

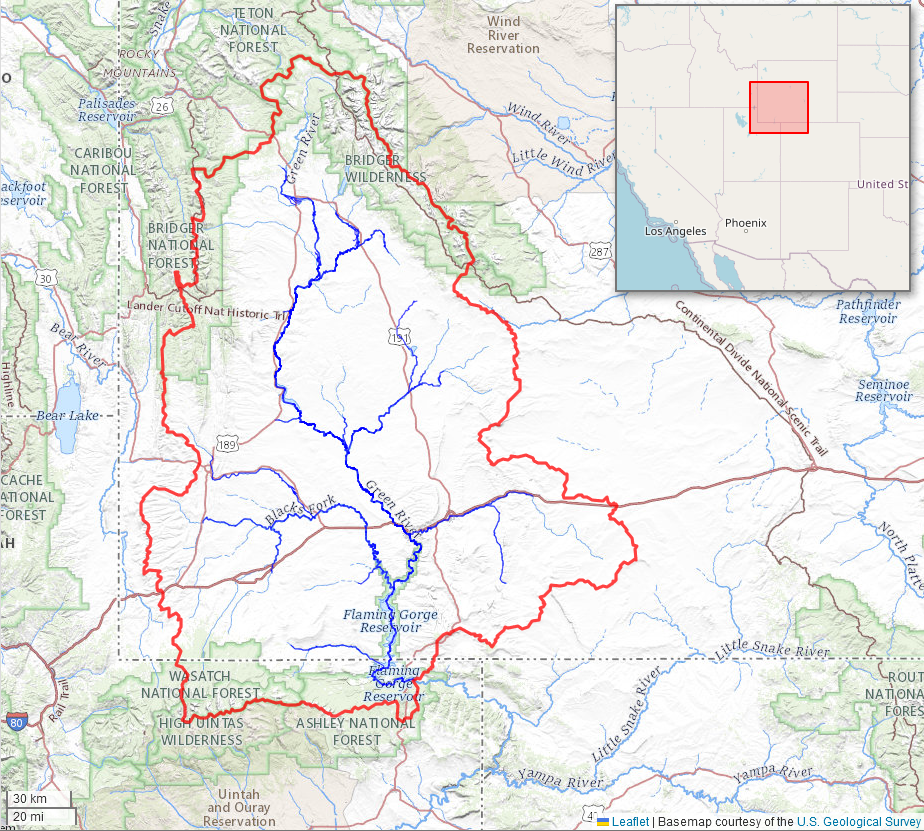
Drainage basin of the Flaming Gorge Reservoir

== Geology ==
The foundation of the reservoir is a narrow, steep-sided canyon composed of siliceous sandstone and hard quartzites inter-bedded with softer shales, siltstones, and argillites. About 1.5 miles (2.4 km) east of the dam, a road cut has revealed a fault scarp on the southbound side with about 9 feet (3 m) of slippage.

== Recreation ==
Visitors enjoy hiking, boating, fishing, windsurfing, camping, backpacking, cross-country skiing, and snowmobiling within Flaming Gorge National Recreation Area, which is operated by Ashley National Forest. Camp sites can be found close to the dam and along Highway 191 for a fee, as well as free throughout the area. Campgrounds operated by the U.S. Forest Service close in the winter months, with the exception of Dripping Springs near Dutch John. There are also public camp sites at Buck Board and Lucerne Marinas, along Highway 530 on the west side of the reservoir. The many available fish species in the reservoir and surrounding lakes are Colorado River Cutthroat trout, Brown trout, Rainbow trout, Lake trout, Kokanee salmon, Smallmouth bass, Burbot, and Common carp. The Green River is a popular spot for fishing, mainly below the dam. The river's ice-cold water and beautiful structure make it a world-class, world-renowned fly fishing stream.

== See also ==
- List of largest reservoirs of Wyoming
