= Dutch John, Utah =

Town in Utah, United States

- Town
- Flaming Gorge Visitor Center

- Location in Daggett County and the state of Utah

- Location of Utah in the United States
- Coordinates: 40°55′48″N 109°24′15″W
- Country: United States
- State: Utah
- County: Daggett
- Founded: 1957
- Incorporated: 2016
- Named for: John Honselena

Area
  - Total: 6.29 sq mi (16.28 km^{2})
  - Land: 5.90 sq mi (15.28 km^{2})
  - Water: 0.39 sq mi (1.00 km^{2})
- Elevation: 6,454 ft (1,967 m)

Population (2020)
  - Total: 141
  - Density: 23.9/sq mi (9.23/km^{2})
- Time zone: UTC-7 (Mountain (MST))
  - Summer (DST): UTC-6 (MDT)
- ZIP code: 84023
- Area code: 435
- FIPS code: 49-20780
- GNIS feature ID: 2783906
- Website: dutchjohn.gov

Dutch John is a town located in eastern Daggett County, Utah, United States, approximately 4 miles (6 km) northeast of the Flaming Gorge Dam on U.S. Route 191. The population was 141 at the 2020 census.

== History ==
The town (but a census-designated place before 2016) was platted and constructed beginning in 1957 by the United States Bureau of Reclamation to house workers working on the construction of Flaming Gorge Dam. After the dam's completion in 1964, Dutch John became home to a smaller number of dam maintenance and operations personnel, as well as employees of the National Park Service and United States Forest Service.

The Dutch John townsite and its buildings continued to be owned by the Bureau of Reclamation until 1998 when the town was privatized. Buildings were sold to individual landowners, and undeveloped land in the town was transferred to Daggett County. The county later completed a master plan for the Dutch John townsite and has begun offering parcels of land for sale to developers.

In July 2002, the human-caused Mustang Ridge fire burned approximately 22,000 acres (89 km^{2}) of pinyon/juniper forest near Dutch John. The fire caused damage to power transmission lines which were supported by wooden poles.

During the peak years of construction activity at Flaming Gorge Dam, as many as 3,500 people lived in Dutch John.

In November 2014, the residents of Dutch John voted overwhelmingly to incorporate into a town. An election was held in June 2015, in which William Rogers was elected mayor; Ryan Kelly, Sandy Kunkel, Harriet Dickerson, and Dave MacDonald were elected as members of the Town Council. They took office, and the incorporation became official in January 2016. In the town's 2021 election, Sandy Kunkel was elected as mayor.

A resort within the town is host to the world's largest fishing fly. It weighs over three tons and is over 32 feet (9.8 m) long.

== Demographics ==
Historical population
Census	Pop.	Note	%±
2010	145		—
2020	141		−2.8%
U.S. Decennial Census

As of the census of 2010, there were 145 people living in the CDP. There were 105 housing units. The racial makeup of the town was 97.2% White, 0.7% American Indian and Alaska Native, 1.4% Asian, and 0.7% from two or more races. Hispanic or Latino of any race was 1.4% of the population.

== Climate ==
Large seasonal temperature differences typify this climatic region, with warm to hot (and often humid) summers and cold (sometimes severely cold) winters. According to the Köppen Climate Classification system, Dutch John has a humid continental climate, abbreviated "Dfb" on climate maps.

== See also ==
- List of municipalities in Utah
