= Flaming Gorge Dam =

Dam on the Green River in Utah, United States

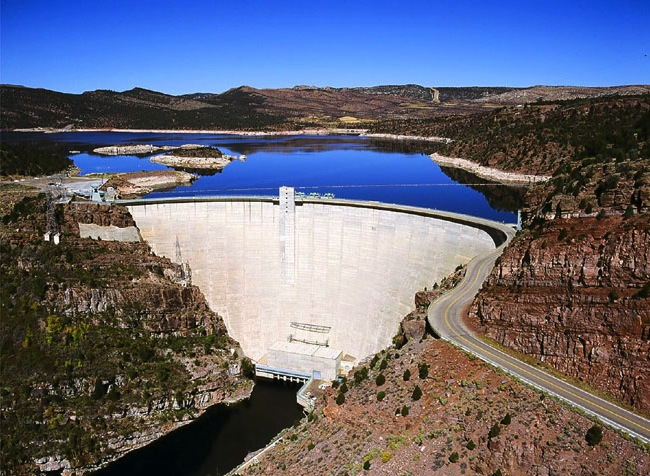
- Interactive map of Flaming Gorge Dam
- Location: Daggett County, Utah
- Coordinates: 40°54′52″N 109°25′17″W
- Construction began: 1958
- Opening date: 1964
- Owner: U.S. Bureau of Reclamation

Dam and spillways
- Type of dam: Concrete thin arch
- Impounds: Green River
- Height: 502 ft (153 m)
- Length: 1,285 ft (392 m)
- Elevation at crest: 6,047 ft (1,843 m)
- Spillways: Gated concrete tunnel
- Spillway capacity: 28,800 cu ft/s (820 m^{3}/s)

Reservoir
- Creates: Flaming Gorge Reservoir
- Total capacity: 3,788,700 acre⋅ft (4.6733 km^{3})
- Catchment area: 15,000 mi^{2} (39,000 km^{2})
- Surface area: 42,020 acres (17,000 ha)
- Normal elevation: 6,040 ft (1,840 m)

Power Station
- Hydraulic head: 400 ft (120 m)
- Turbines: 3x Francis
- Installed capacity: 151.95 MW
- Capacity factor: 25.9%
- Annual generation: 344,369,058 kWh

Flaming Gorge Dam is a concrete thin-arch dam on the Green River, a major tributary of the Colorado River, in northern Utah in the United States. Flaming Gorge Dam forms the Flaming Gorge Reservoir, which extends 91 miles (146 km) into southern Wyoming, submerging four distinct gorges of the Green River. The dam is a major component of the Colorado River Storage Project, which stores and distributes upper Colorado River Basin water.

The dam takes its name from a nearby section of the Green River canyon, named by John Wesley Powell in 1869. It was built by the U.S. Bureau of Reclamation between 1958 and 1964. The dam is 502 feet (153 m) high and 1,285 feet (392 m) long, and its reservoir has a capacity of more than 3.7 million acre-feet (4.6 km^{3}), or about twice the annual flow of the upper Green. Operated to provide long-term storage for downstream water-rights commitments, the dam is also a major source of hydroelectricity and is the main flood-control facility for the Green River system.

The dam and reservoir have fragmented the upper Green River, blocking fish migration and significantly impacting many native species. Water released from the dam is generally cold and clear, as compared to the river's naturally warm and silty flow, further changing the local riverine ecology. However, the cold water from Flaming Gorge has transformed about 28 miles (45 km) of the Green into a "Blue Ribbon Trout Fishery". The Flaming Gorge Reservoir, largely situated in Flaming Gorge National Recreation Area, is also considered one of Utah and Wyoming's greatest fisheries.

== History and location ==
Contrary to its namesake, Flaming Gorge, the dam actually lies in steep, rapid-strewn Red Canyon in northeastern Utah, close to where the Green River cuts through the Uinta Mountains. The canyon, for which the dam is named, is buried under the reservoir almost 20 miles (32 km) upstream. Red Canyon is the narrowest and deepest of the four on the Green in the area (Horseshoe, Kingfisher, Red and Flaming Gorge), which made it the best site for the building of a dam. Flaming Gorge, on the other hand, was named by John Wesley Powell on his 1869 expedition down the Green and Colorado rivers for the "brilliant, flaming red of its rocks [when the sun shone upon them]."

Flaming Gorge Dam is one of six that make up the Colorado River Storage Project (CRSP), a massive system of reservoirs created in the upper Colorado River Basin by the Bureau of Reclamation from the 1950s to the 1970s. The project itself was the indirect result of a system of agreements signed by the seven U.S. states and two Mexican provinces in the early 20th century dividing the flow of the Colorado River among them. Among the terms stated in the 1922 Colorado River Compact reserved 7.5 million acre-feet (9.3 km^{3}) for the Upper Basin states of Wyoming, Colorado, Utah and New Mexico and an equal amount for the Lower Basin states of Arizona, Nevada and California. Due to the Colorado's high year-to-year variations in flow, the upper basin could not fulfill the lower basin's allotments in dry years, and much water was wasted during wet years because of the lack of a means to impound it.

Well before the CRSP's inception in 1956, the Bureau had begun to look for suitable reservoir sites along the upper Colorado and tributaries such as the Green, San Juan and Gunnison Rivers. One of the earlier proposals was called Echo Park Dam, at the confluence of the Green and Yampa Rivers within the Dinosaur National Monument in northwestern Colorado. The Sierra Club, led by David Brower, rallied against the proposal in the media and later in the courts. When the Bureau backed down from the Echo Park proposal, it was seen as one of the environmentalism movement's early victories – but it came with a compromise. A dam would still be built on the Green River, just 50 miles (80 km) upstream near a brilliant red-rock canyon called Flaming Gorge. A common misconception is that the building of the controversial Glen Canyon Dam was part of this "compromise for Echo Park", but in reality the Bureau had always planned to build a dam at Glen Canyon regardless of the outcome of the Echo Park debate.

Apart from impounding the Green River, Flaming Gorge Dam also carries U.S. Route 191 over the river.

== Climate ==
Climate data for Flaming Gorge Dam, UT
Month	Jan	Feb	Mar	Apr	May	Jun	Jul	Aug	Sep	Oct	Nov	Dec	Year
Record high °F (°C)	59 (15)	66 (19)	76 (24)	82 (28)	93 (34)	100 (38)	102 (39)	99 (37)	93 (34)	84 (29)	75 (24)	64 (18)	102 (39)
Mean daily maximum °F (°C)	35.7 (2.1)	39.7 (4.3)	47.4 (8.6)	56.7 (13.7)	67.7 (19.8)	78.4 (25.8)	86.2 (30.1)	83.9 (28.8)	74.6 (23.7)	61.7 (16.5)	45.6 (7.6)	36.3 (2.4)	59.5 (15.3)
Mean daily minimum °F (°C)	9.6 (−12.4)	13.0 (−10.6)	20.9 (−6.2)	28.3 (−2.1)	36.0 (2.2)	43.4 (6.3)	50.4 (10.2)	48.8 (9.3)	40.0 (4.4)	30.4 (−0.9)	20.5 (−6.4)	11.8 (−11.2)	29.4 (−1.4)
Record low °F (°C)	−38 (−39)	−31 (−35)	−14 (−26)	−4 (−20)	14 (−10)	22 (−6)	30 (−1)	26 (−3)	11 (−12)	−4 (−20)	−17 (−27)	−36 (−38)	−38 (−39)
Average precipitation inches (mm)	0.44 (11)	0.58 (15)	0.96 (24)	1.43 (36)	1.47 (37)	1.14 (29)	0.99 (25)	1.19 (30)	1.16 (29)	1.29 (33)	0.71 (18)	0.57 (14)	11.93 (301)
Average snowfall inches (cm)	8.5 (22)	8.1 (21)	9.6 (24)	5.9 (15)	1.0 (2.5)	0.2 (0.51)	0 (0)	0 (0)	0.1 (0.25)	3.9 (9.9)	6.7 (17)	7.9 (20)	51.9 (132.16)
Source: http://www.wrcc.dri.edu/cgi-bin/cliMAIN.pl?ut0074

== Construction ==
The building of Flaming Gorge Dam started just a few months after the CRSP was approved in Congress, when President Dwight D. Eisenhower pressed a button on his desk in the White House and set off the first blast in Red Canyon. Site preparations and geologic inspections continued as Dutch John, the company town that provided housing for the workers, was completed just northeast of the dam site by 1958. More than 3000 people would inhabit Dutch John at the peak of construction. The main contract for dam construction was awarded to Arch Dam Constructors, a conglomerate of Peter Kiewit Sons, Morrison-Knudsen Company, Mid-Valley Utility Constructors Inc. and Coker Construction Company. Actual construction at the dam site did not begin until late 1958 when work began on the diversion tunnel that would send the Green River around the dam site in order to clear it.

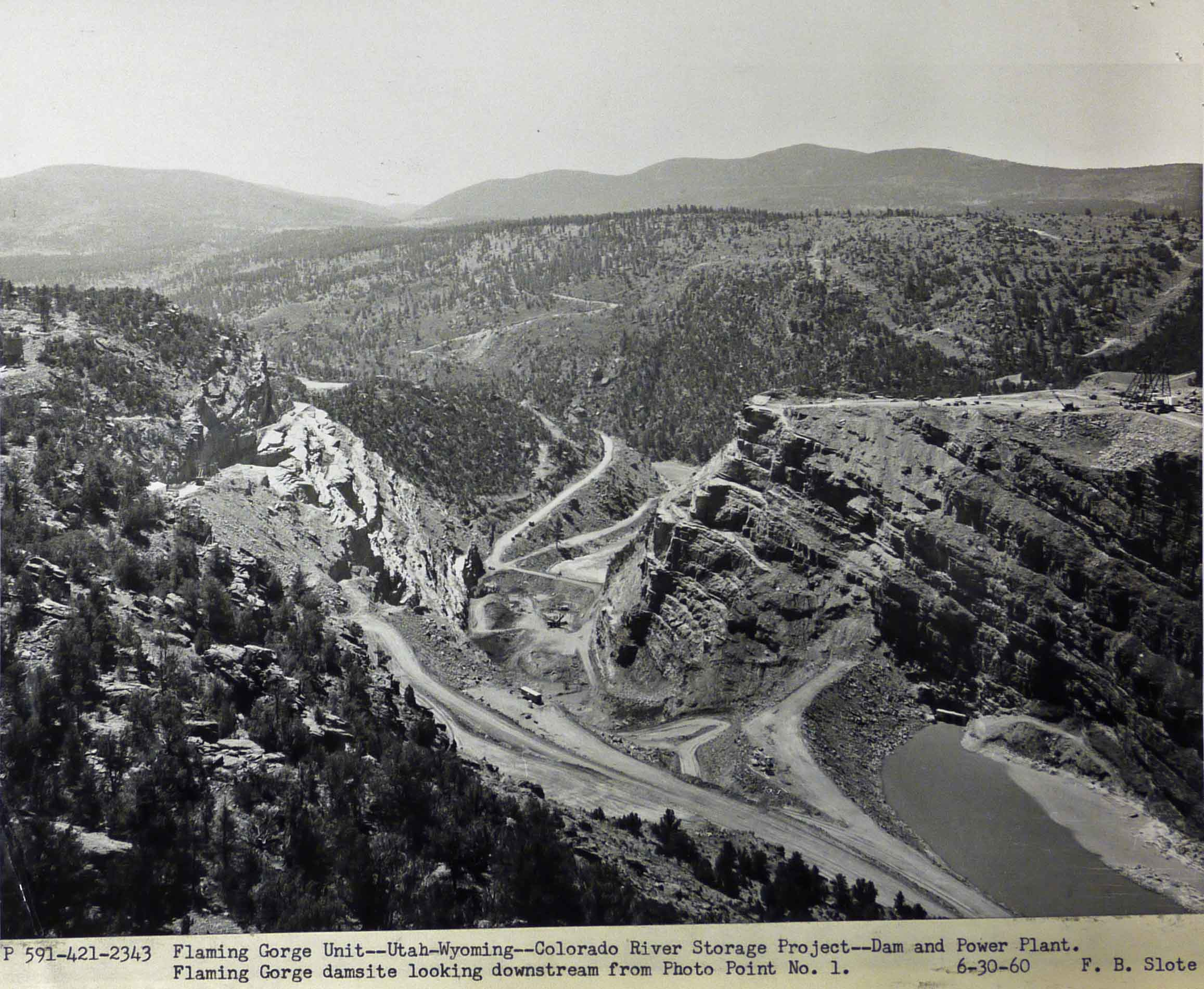
Flaming Gorge Damsite June 30, 1960

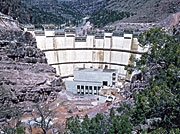
Construction work on Flaming Gorge Dam, 1962

By April 1959, excavation of the diversion tunnel had been completed, and the concrete lining was finished on August 17. Work on a pair of earthen cofferdams above and below the dam site commenced when the tunnel was ready, and the river was channeled around the dam site on November 19 with the completion of the upper cofferdam. Keyway (foundation) excavations for the dam on the right abutment and construction of the spillway inlet works in the left abutment were begun in September, and all preliminary canyon wall structures were completed by early 1960. The lower cofferdam was finished in February, allowing workers to pump water from the space between the two barriers. The silt and sediment that comprised the riverbed had to be removed in order to reach a solid rock where foundations could be drilled; this was completed in August 1960, allowing work on the main dam foundations to begin.

Flaming Gorge was built in block-shaped stages of concrete called "forms". The first concrete for the powerhouse was placed on September 8, and construction of the main dam wall began ten days later. In order to accelerate hardening of the concrete, cold water was pumped through metal tubing, or "coils", embedded in the structure. Concrete placement continued until November 15, 1962, when workers topped out the dam. By the end of 1962, both the river outlet works and the spillway tunnel were completed, and the diversion tunnel was closed, allowing water to begin rising behind the dam. The dam's hydroelectric generators were installed by mid–August 1963 and the first unit went into operation on September 27 at the press of a switch by President John F. Kennedy. The dam was officially dedicated by Lady Bird Johnson on August 17 of the following year.

== Dimensions and operations ==
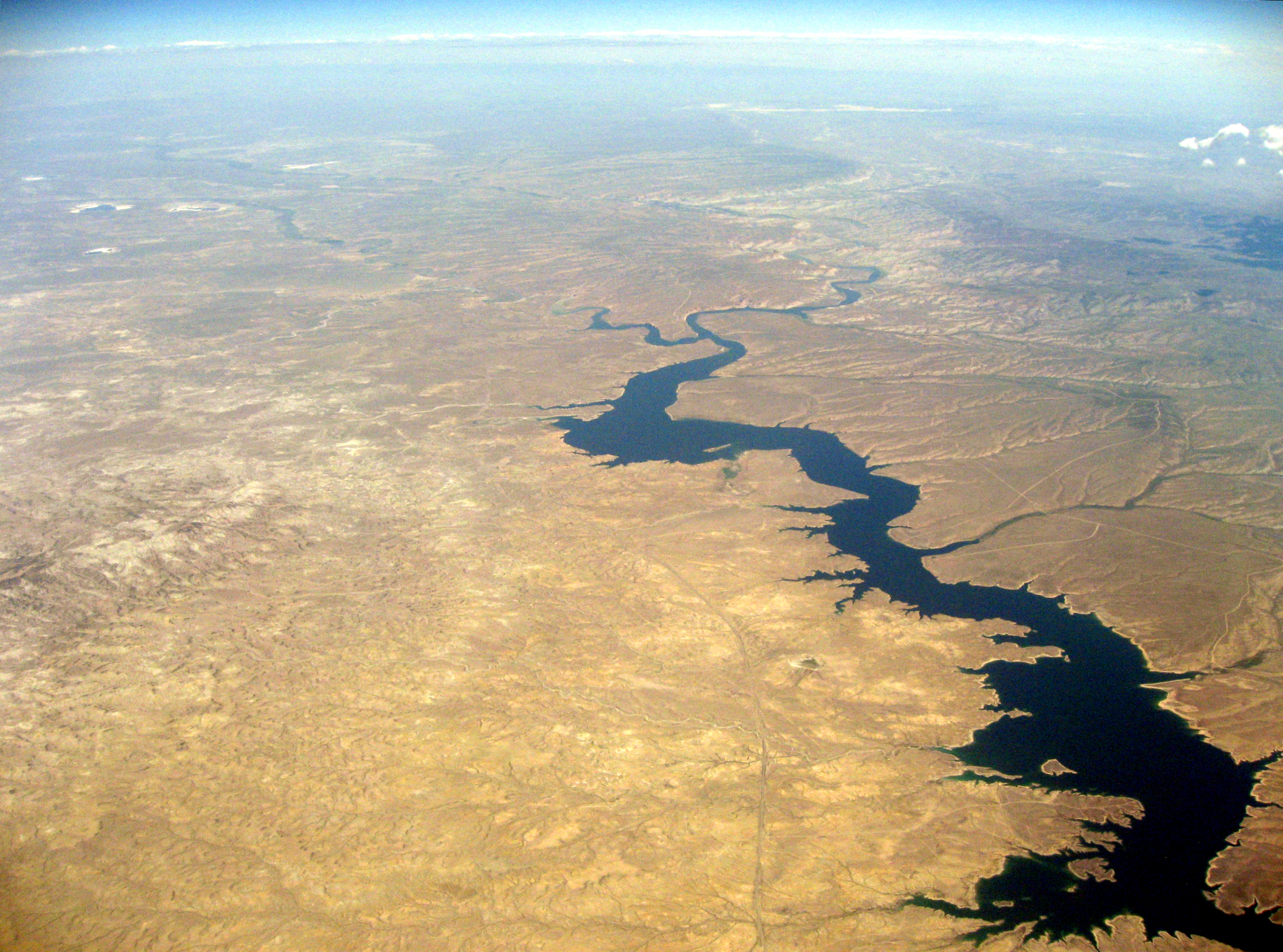
Flaming Gorge Reservoir in Wyoming

=== Dam and reservoir ===
The Flaming Gorge Dam stands 502 feet (153 m) high above its foundations and 448 feet (137 m) above the Green River. It measures 1,285 feet (392 m) long along its crest, with a maximum base thickness of 131 feet (40 m), while its crest thickness is 27 feet (8.2 m). The dam contains about 987,000 cubic yards (755,000 m^{3}) of concrete. The reservoir first reached its maximum elevation of 6,040 feet (1,840 m) in August 1974, with a maximum surface area of 42,020 acres (170.0 km^{2}). The conservation storage capacity is 3,788,700 acre-feet (4.6733 km^{3}), of which 3,515,700 acre⋅ft (4.3366 km^{3}) is active capacity, useful for release and power generation. During floods the reservoir can go about 5 feet (1.5 m) higher, for a total of 4,003,100 acre-feet (4.9378 km^{3}), spreading over 43,820 acres (17,730 ha).

=== Power plant ===
The dam's hydroelectric power plant is located at its base. It consists of three 50,650-kilowatt generators, powered by three Francis turbines of 50,000 horsepower (37,000 kW). The total nameplate generating capacity of the Flaming Gorge Dam is 151,950 kilowatts. Three 10-foot-diameter (3.0 m) penstocks feed water to the power plant. The Bureau of Reclamation operates the power plant, and the Western Area Power Administration markets the power generated by the dam. The original 1963 capacity of the powerplant was 108 megawatts, or 36 megawatts per generator. The generators were uprated to their present capacity between August 1990 and April 1992.

The power plant originally operated on a peaking basis, which caused large daily fluctuations in river flow, with sharp peaks in the daytime and extremely low flows at night. In 1992, the release patterns from the dam were placed under legal constraints due to a biological opinion to protect endangered fish species. In 2006 the release patterns were further modified under an "Action Alternative" designed by the US Fish and Wildlife Service in order to mimic natural flows. The power plant now releases water based on the natural seasonal hydrograph of the Green River before damming. In addition, water flows must be maintained above 800 cubic feet per second (23 m^{3}/s) at all times.

On August 11, 1977, the Unit 2 turbine jammed after one of the sealing rings on the penstock failed. This event led to the seal rings on all three penstocks being replaced. These seal rings also failed, and were replaced again. However, no major structural damage to the dam occurred.

=== Spillways ===
The spillway consists of a 675-foot-long (206 m) tunnel that runs through the left abutment of the dam. Two 16.75-by-34-foot (5.11 m × 10.36 m) gates at the tunnel entrance will pass up to 28,800 cubic feet per second (820 m^{3}/s) of floodwater. At its upstream end the tunnel is 26.5 feet (8.1 m) in diameter, and at the discharge point is 18 feet (5.5 m) in diameter. The dam's outlet works consist of two 72-inch-diameter (1.8 m) steel pipes through the dam. The discharge capacity of the outlet works is 4,000 cubic feet per second (110 m^{3}/s). Due to the large storage capacity of the reservoir, the tunnel spillway is rarely used, except for high-water years such as 1983–84. As originally built, the spillway suffered cavitation damage caused by the high velocity of water rushing over the concrete lining. The installation of an aeration slot in the spillway in the mid-1980s remediated these problems.

== Environmental impacts ==
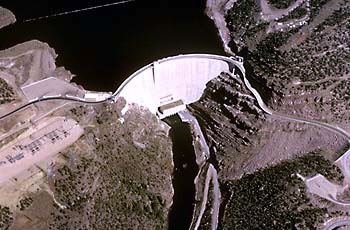
An aerial view of the Flaming Gorge Dam, by the U.S. Bureau of Reclamation.

By halting floods and artificially increasing low flows, Flaming Gorge Dam has changed the characteristics of the Green River tremendously, especially above its confluence with the Yampa River: "The deafening roar of the spring flood through the Canyon of Lodore in Dinosaur National Monument is subdued to the point that the sound no longer conveys a sense of the power that created this very place."

River regulation has led to the growth of riparian zones along the Green River where they would not have developed naturally because of the erosive effects of floods. The reduction in flow changes has also caused a decline in amphibian habitat along the river. The dam traps the river's high sediment loads, which has been detrimental to many native fish stocks. The cold and clear water releases have caused bank erosion and loss of sandbars, and as a result, crucial habitat of four species of native fish in parts of the Green River have been lost. On August 28, 2008, the Bureau of Reclamation prepared an EIS (Environmental Impact Statement) on the operation of the dam to meet the river flow required by Section 7 of the Endangered Species Act. The four native fishes affected are the razorback sucker, Colorado pikeminnow, humpback chub, and bonytail chub.

The cold water, however, has allowed the proliferation of introduced trout populations. About 28 miles (45 km) of the Green River below the dam is designated as a "Blue Ribbon Trout Fishery", below which the water tends to be warmer and more suitable for native species. In addition, Flaming Gorge Reservoir has become "nationally known for the spectacular fishing available in the reservoir's cool clear water which is ideal for growing large trout".

== Proposed water diversion ==
In the early 21st century, the Colorado River system has come under stress due to a severe drought. Colorado's fast-growing Front Range Urban Corridor, which is not situated in the Colorado River basin but receives water from it via diversions across the Rocky Mountains, is projected to run out of water in as little as 20 years if no new supplies are developed. One contentious proposal to augment the water supply is via a 501-mile (806 km) pipeline from Flaming Gorge Reservoir to southeastern Wyoming and thence to eastern Colorado. The $9 billion diversion would provide about 160,000 to 200,000 acre-feet (0.20 to 0.25 km^{3}) of new water per year for the Front Range. Although eastern Colorado is lower in elevation than Flaming Gorge Reservoir, the water would have to be pumped over the Rocky Mountains, making the project a net power consumer. The proposal has caused significant disputes over water rights with about 87 percent of Wyoming residents polled opposing the project. Both the Federal Energy Regulatory Commission and U.S. Army Corps of Engineers have denied permits for the project's construction.

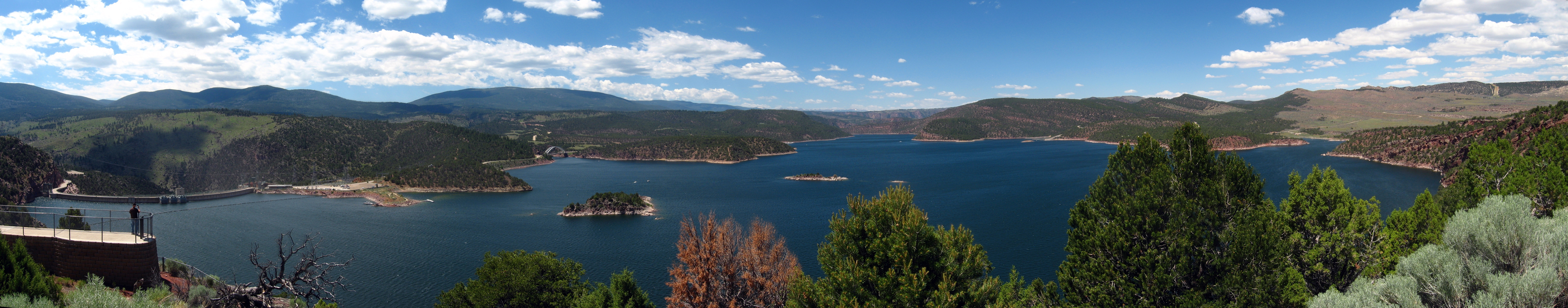
The lower end of Flaming Gorge Reservoir is seen nearly full in July 2010. The Flaming Gorge Dam is seen to the left.

== See also ==
- Blue Mesa Dam
- Dams in the Colorado River system
- List of reservoirs and dams in the United States
- List of the tallest dams in the United States
- Navajo Dam
