= Flaming Gorge National Recreation Area =

Place in Wyoming and Utah

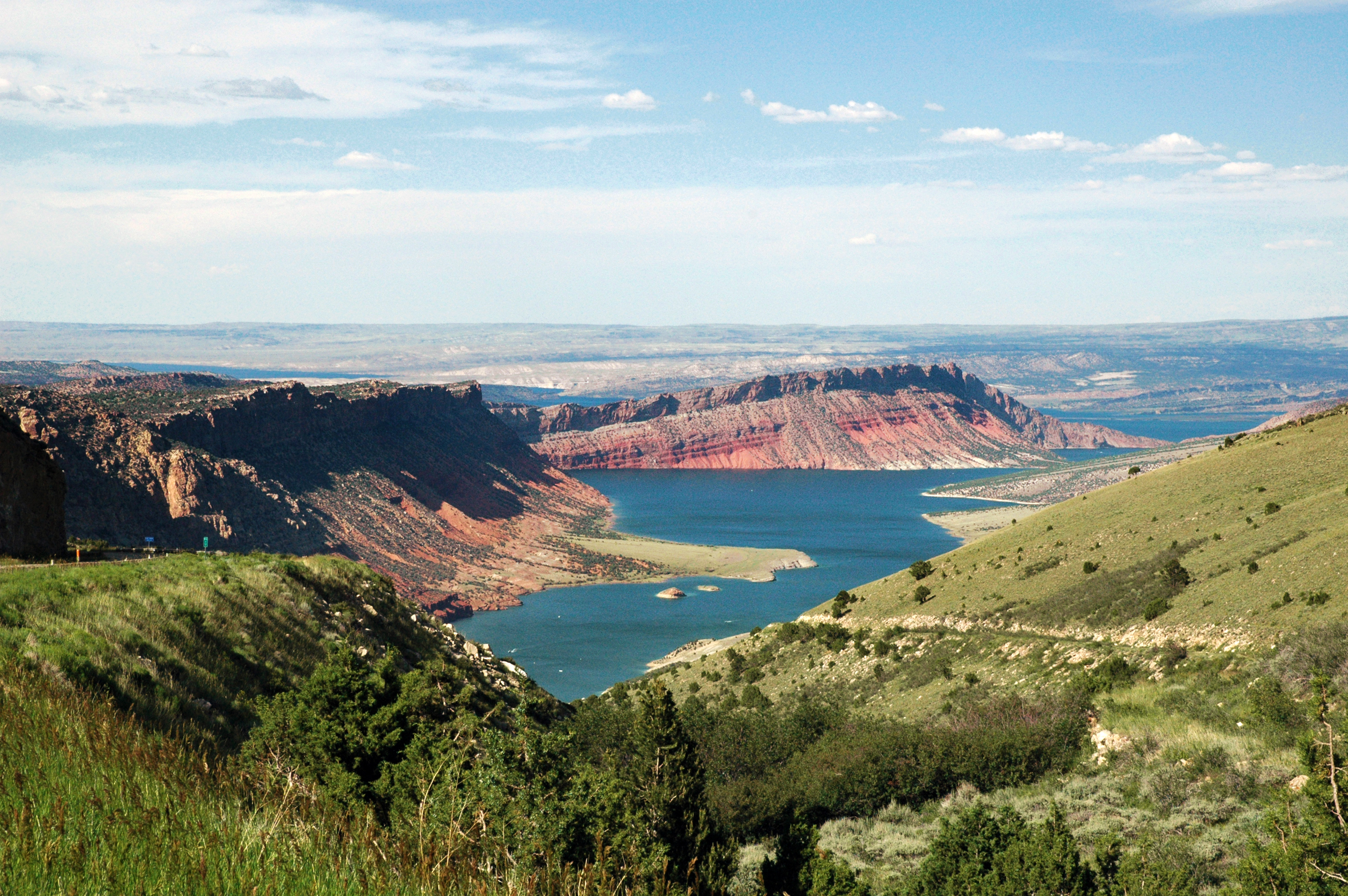
- Flaming Gorge Reservoir with namesake red sandstone cliffs.

- Location within Wyoming Location within Utah Location within the United States
- Location: Sweetwater County, Wyoming / Daggett County, Utah, USA
- Nearest city: Green River, Wyoming
- Coordinates: 40°54′52″N 109°25′17″W
- Area: 207,363 acres (83,917 ha)
- Established: October 1, 1968
- Governing body: United States Forest Service
- Website: Flaming Gorge National Recreation Area

Flaming Gorge National Recreation Area is a United States national recreation area in Wyoming and Utah. Its centerpiece is the 91 miles (146 km) long Flaming Gorge Reservoir.

== History ==
The area was given the name "Flaming Gorge" by John Wesley Powell during his 1869 expedition down the Green River, due to the spectacular, gorgeous red sandstone cliffs that surround this part of the river.

The Flaming Gorge reservoir was created by the 1964 construction of the Flaming Gorge Dam across the Green River. The area was established as a National Recreation Area by an act of Congress on October 1, 1968.

== Uses ==
=== Power ===
Flaming Gorge Dam is used to generate hydroelectric power. Three turbines and generators at the base of the dam have the capacity to produce 50,650 kilowatts of electrical power each.

=== Recreation ===
Flaming Gorge National Recreation area is administered by the Ashley National Forest.

Activities in the recreation area include camping, biking, rock climbing, paddling, hiking, boating and fishing on the Flaming Gorge Reservoir, and rafting on the portion of the Green River downstream from Flaming Gorge Dam.

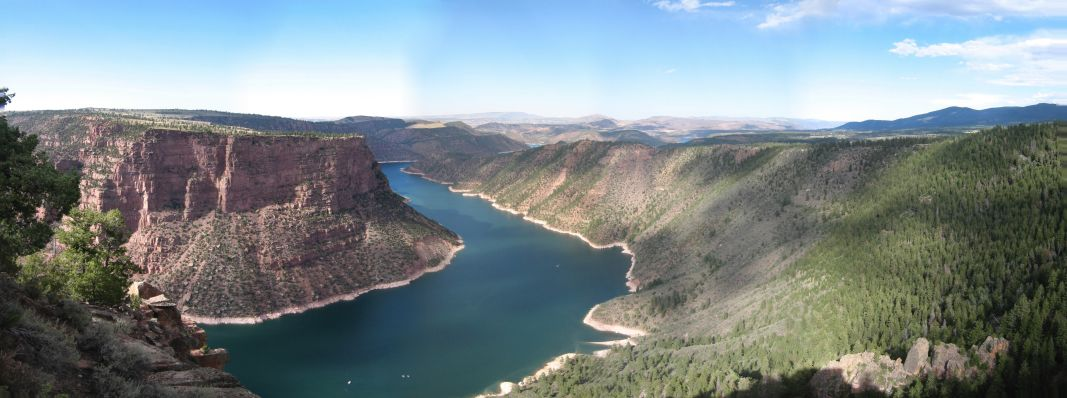
Flaming Gorge panorama
