= Henrys Fork Peak =

Mountain in Utah, United States

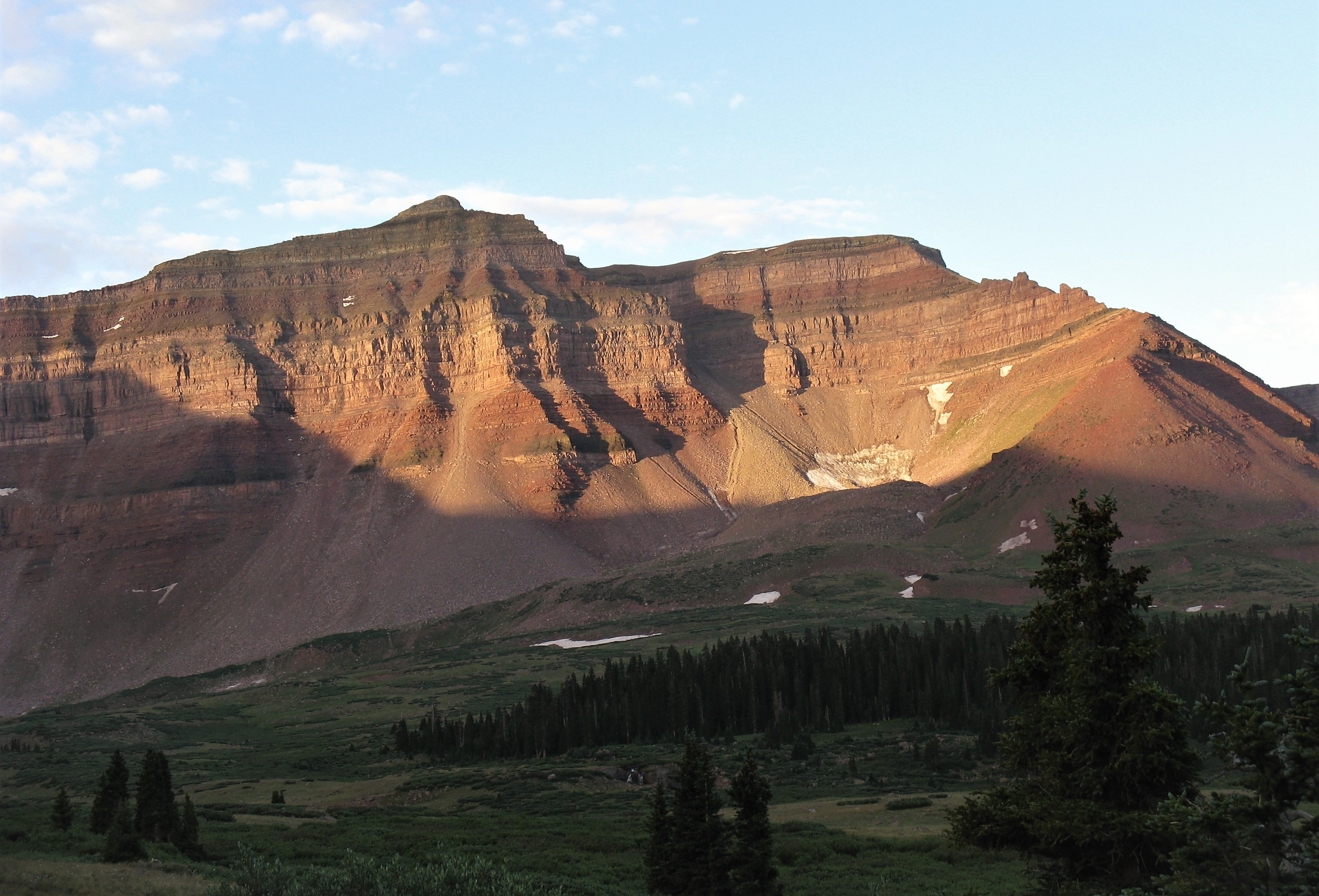
- North aspect

Highest point
- Elevation: 13,260 ft (4,042 m)
- Prominence: 560 ft (171 m)
- Parent peak: Kings Peak (13,528 ft)
- Isolation: 1.19 mi (1.92 km)
- Coordinates: 40°47′16″N 110°23′23″W

Geography
- Location within Utah Location within the United States
- Country: United States of America
- State: Utah
- County: Summit / Duchesne
- Protected area: High Uintas Wilderness
- Parent range: Uinta Mountains; Rocky Mountains
- Topo map: USGS Mount Powell

Geology
- Rock age: Neoproterozoic
- Rock type: Metasedimentary rock

Climbing
- Easiest route: class 2 hiking

Henrys Fork Peak is a 13,260-foot elevation (4,042 m) mountain summit located on the common border that Duchesne County shares with Summit County in the U.S. state of Utah.

== Description ==
Henrys Fork Peak is set within the High Uintas Wilderness on land managed by Ashley National Forest and Uinta-Wasatch-Cache National Forest. The peak is situated along the crest of the Uinta Mountains and it ranks as the eighth-highest summit in Utah. Neighbors include Mount Powell 1.91 mile west-northwest and line parent Kings Peak, the highest peak in Utah, is 1.18 mile southeast. Topographic relief is significant as the summit rises 2,000 feet (610 meters) above the Henrys Fork basin in one-half mile. Precipitation runoff from this mountain's north slope drains to the Green River via Henrys Fork and from the south slope into headwaters of Yellowstone Creek which is a tributary of the Yellowstone River (of Utah). Access to the peak is from the Uinta Highline Trail which traverses the south slope.

== Etymology ==
This mountain's toponym has not been officially adopted by the United States Board on Geographic Names, so it is not labelled on USGS maps, and will remain unofficial as long as the USGS policy of not adopting new toponyms in designated wilderness areas remains in effect. The peak is named in association with officially-named Henrys Fork, a stream which originates immediately north of the peak. Henrys Fork may be named for Andrew Henry. The mountain is also known as "Fortress Peak."

== Climate ==
Based on the Köppen climate classification, Henrys Fork Peak is located in a subarctic climate zone with cold snowy winters and mild summers. Tundra climate characterizes the summit and highest slopes.

== See also ==
- Geology of the Uinta Mountains
- Thirteener

== Gallery ==
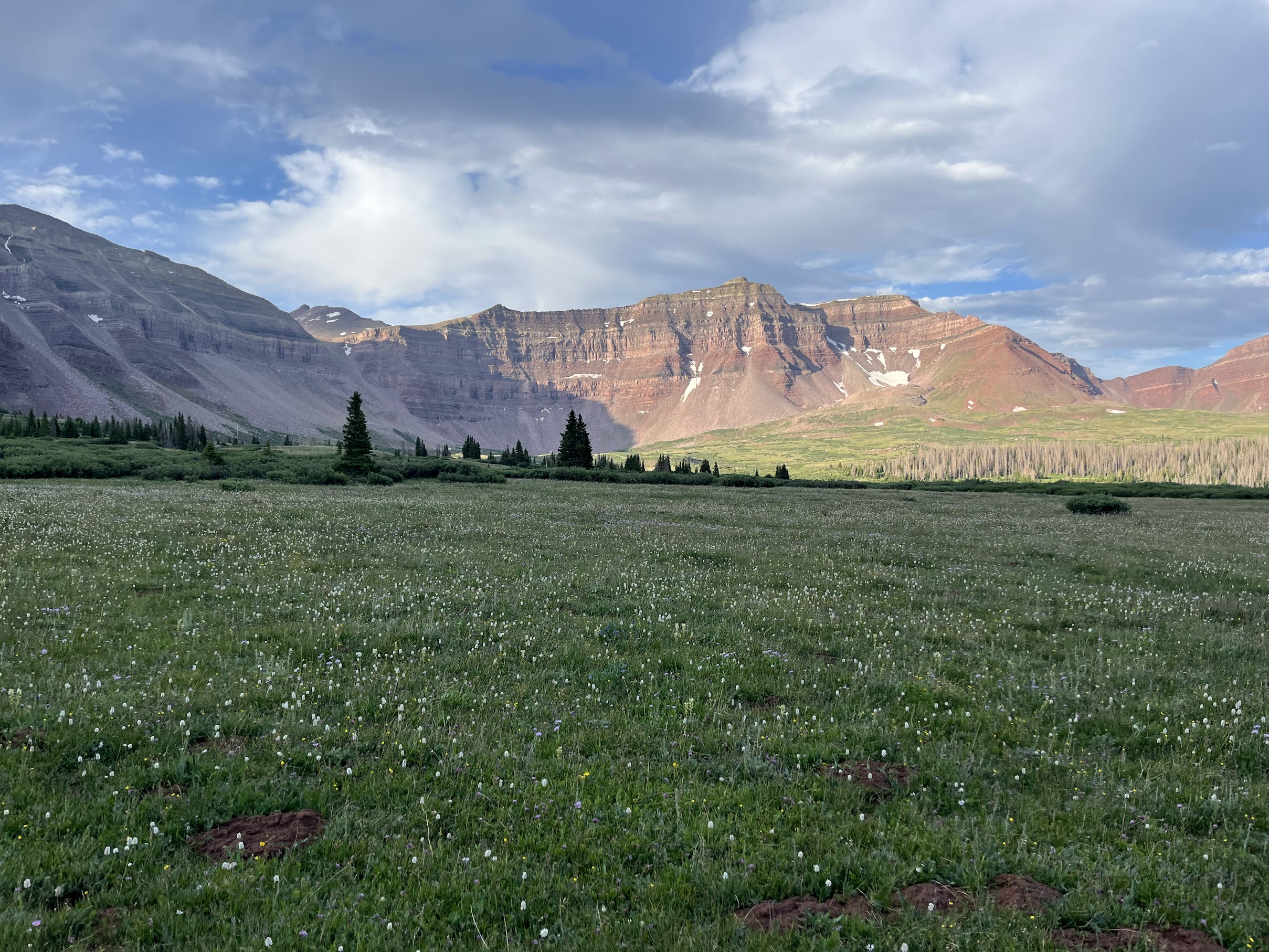

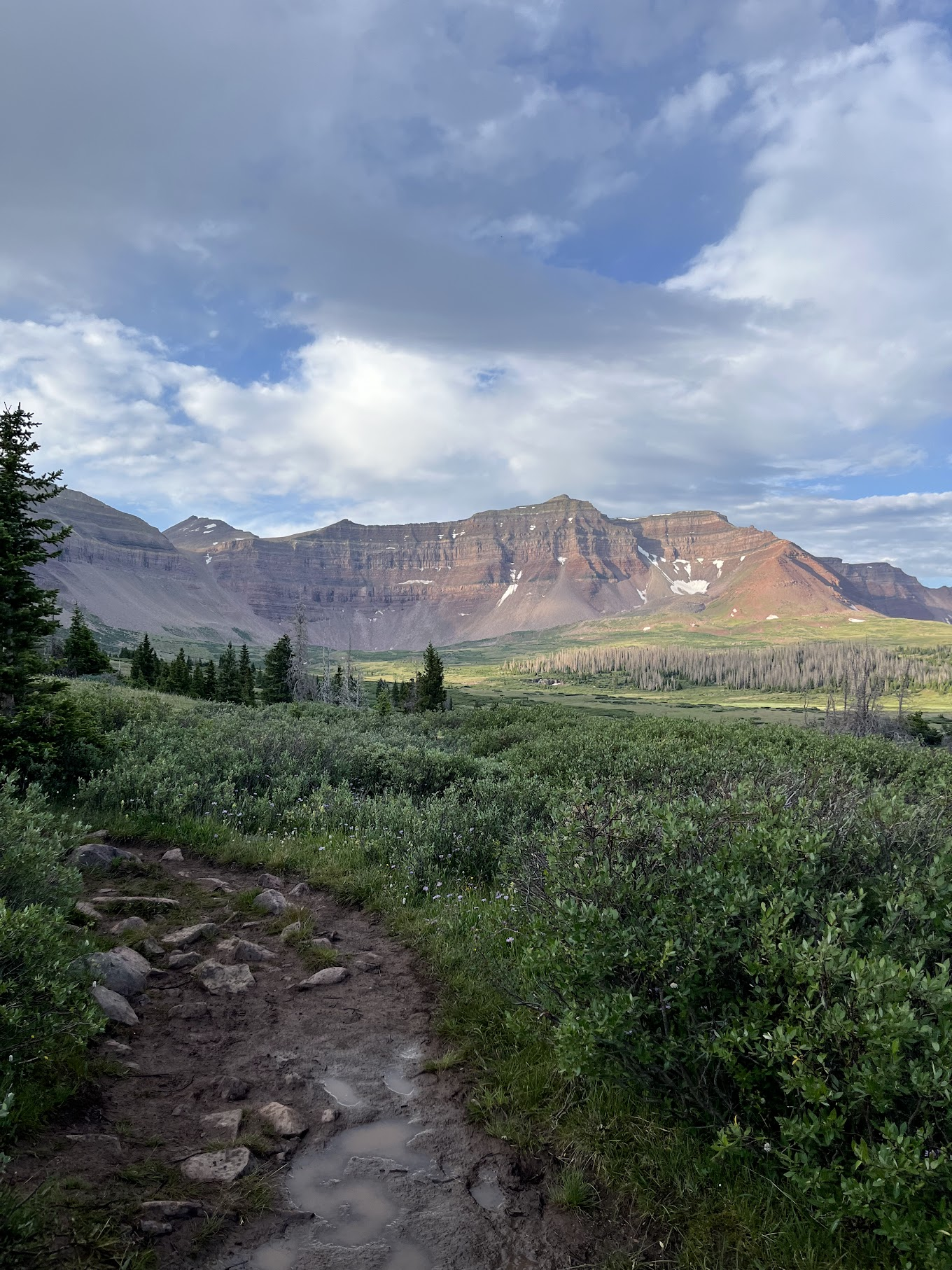
