= Reids Peak =

Mountain summit in Utah, United States

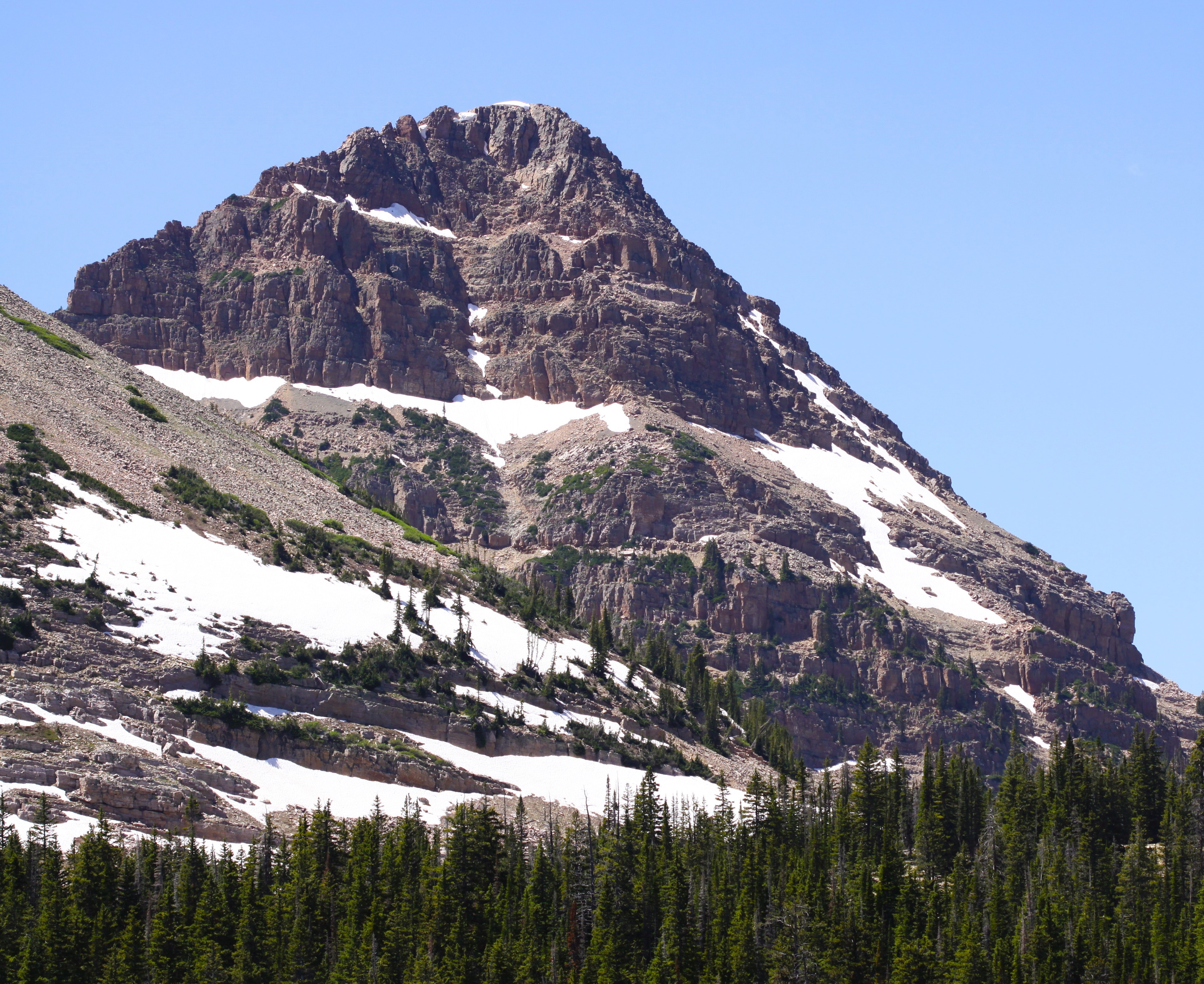
- East aspect

Highest point
- Elevation: 11,724 ft (3,573 m)
- Prominence: 670 ft (204 m)
- Parent peak: Bald Mountain (11,948 ft)
- Isolation: 0.59 mi (0.95 km)
- Coordinates: 40°42′23″N 110°54′45″W

Geography
- Location within Utah Location within the United States
- Country: United States of America
- State: Utah
- County: Summit
- Parent range: Uinta Mountains; Rocky Mountains
- Topo map: USGS Mirror Lake

Geology
- Rock age: Late Precambrian
- Rock type: Quartz arenite

Climbing
- Easiest route: class 2+ scrambling

Reids Peak is an 11,724-foot-elevation (3,573-meter) mountain summit in Summit County, Utah, United States.

== Description ==
Reids Peak is located 50 miles (80 km) east of Salt Lake City in the Uinta-Wasatch-Cache National Forest. It is situated in the western Uinta Mountains which are a subrange of the Rocky Mountains. Precipitation runoff from this mountain drains north into headwaters of the Weber River. Topographic relief is significant as the summit rises 2,300 feet (701 meters) above the Weber River in one mile (1.6 km). Access to the mountain is via the Mirror Lake Highway. The mountain was first named "Reeds Peak" in 1875, and the present spelling of the toponym was officially adopted in 1932 by the U.S. Board on Geographic Names. The peak is named after an early explorer of this region. William "Toopeechee" Reed was an early pioneer of this region who founded Reed Trading Post in 1828, making this the first permanent non-Indian residence and business in what would become the State of Utah.

== Geology ==
Reids Peak is composed of metasedimentary rock of the Mount Watson Formation. Fluvial sediment processes deposited a sequence of nearly white quartz arenite and subarkose interbedded with minor amounts of pale-red arkosic arenite and grayish-green shale during the Late Precambrian. The Uintas were uplifted during the Laramide orogeny about 70 to 50 million years ago. The area around Reids Peak and Bald Mountain became an ice cap during glaciation of the Ice age, transforming these peaks into nunataks. Numerous glacial cycles during the Quaternary Period sculpted the peak and scoured the surrounding land forming many depressions that are now lakes. Viewed from the summit, as many as 70 lakes can be counted.

== Climate ==
Based on the Köppen climate classification, Reids Peak is located in a subarctic climate zone with cold snowy winters and mild summers. Tundra climate characterizes the summit and highest slopes.

== See also ==
- Geology of the Uinta Mountains
- List of mountains in Utah

== Gallery ==
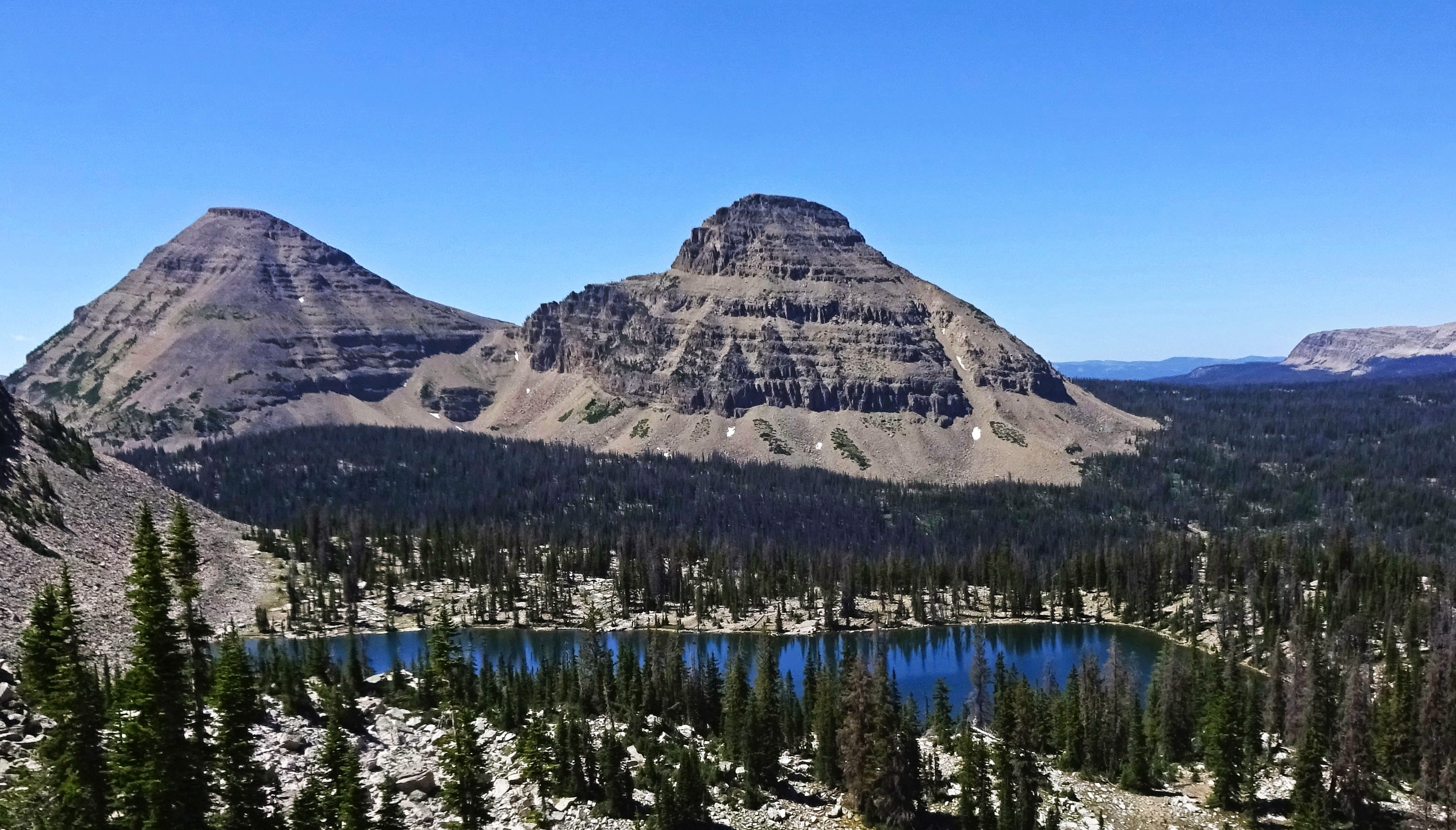
North aspect of Reids Peak (center), with Bald Mountain (left). Kamas Lake in foreground.

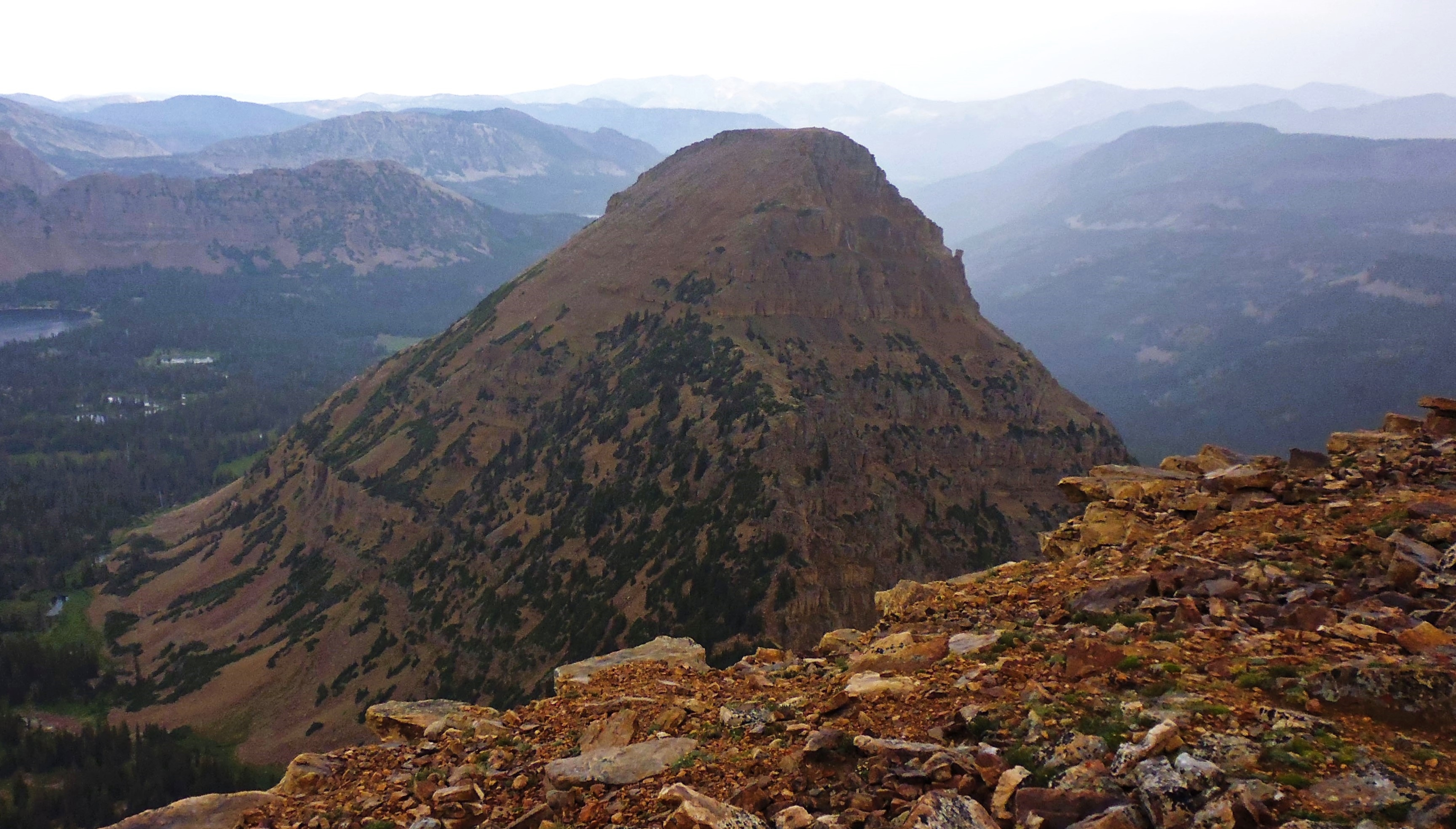
Reids Peak viewed from the top of Bald Mountain.

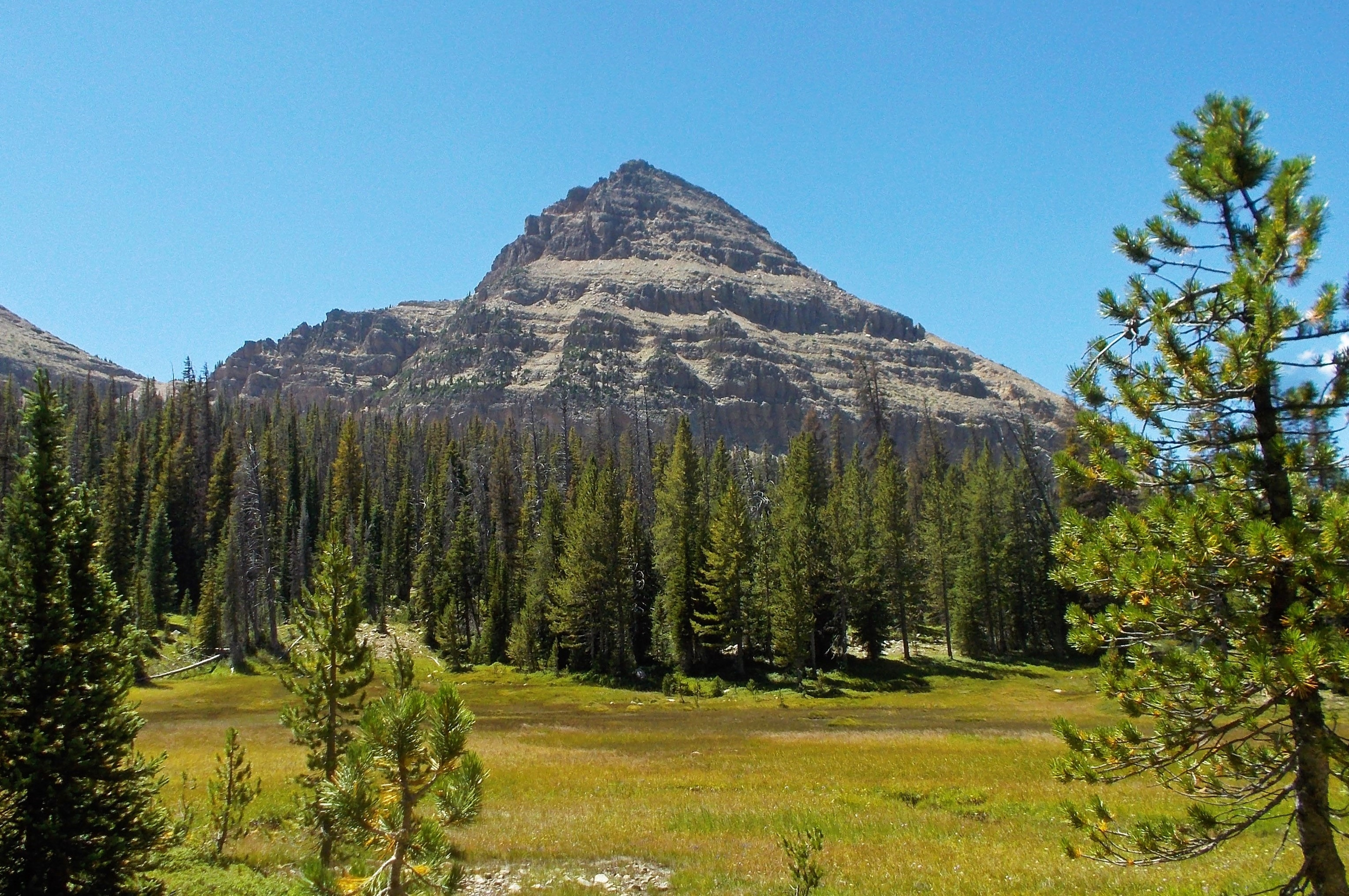
Northeast aspect

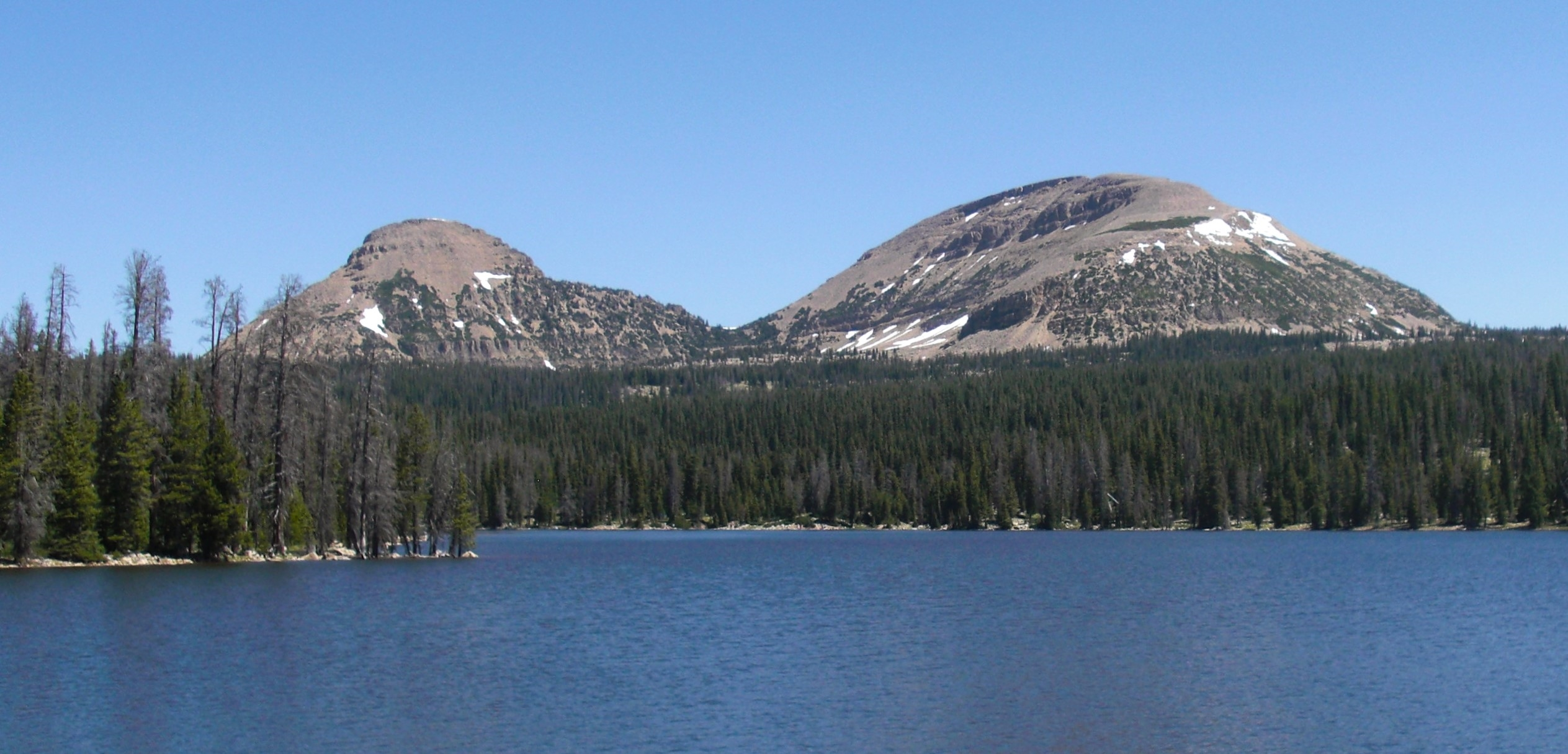
Southwest aspects of Reids Peak (left) and Bald Mountain (right) viewed from Lost Lake

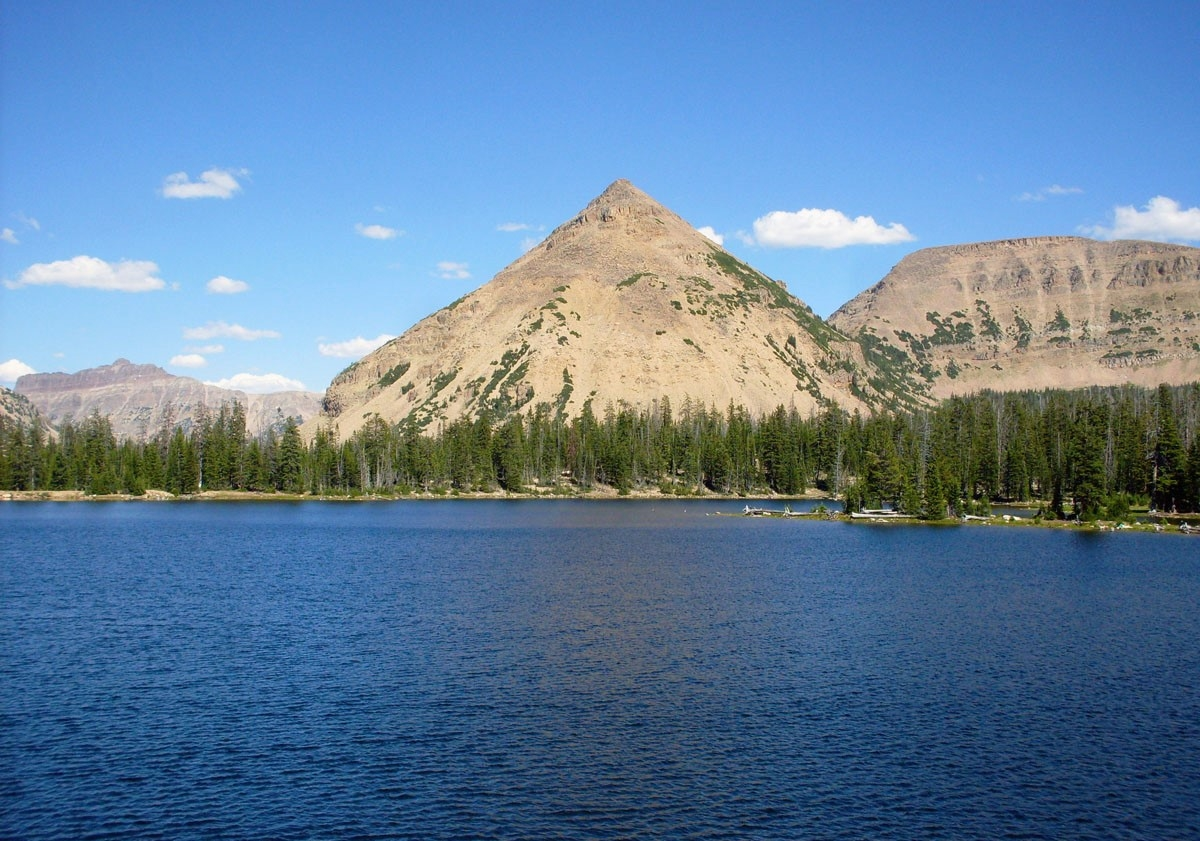
West aspect, from Reids Lake
