= Uinta Highline Trail =

Trail in Utah

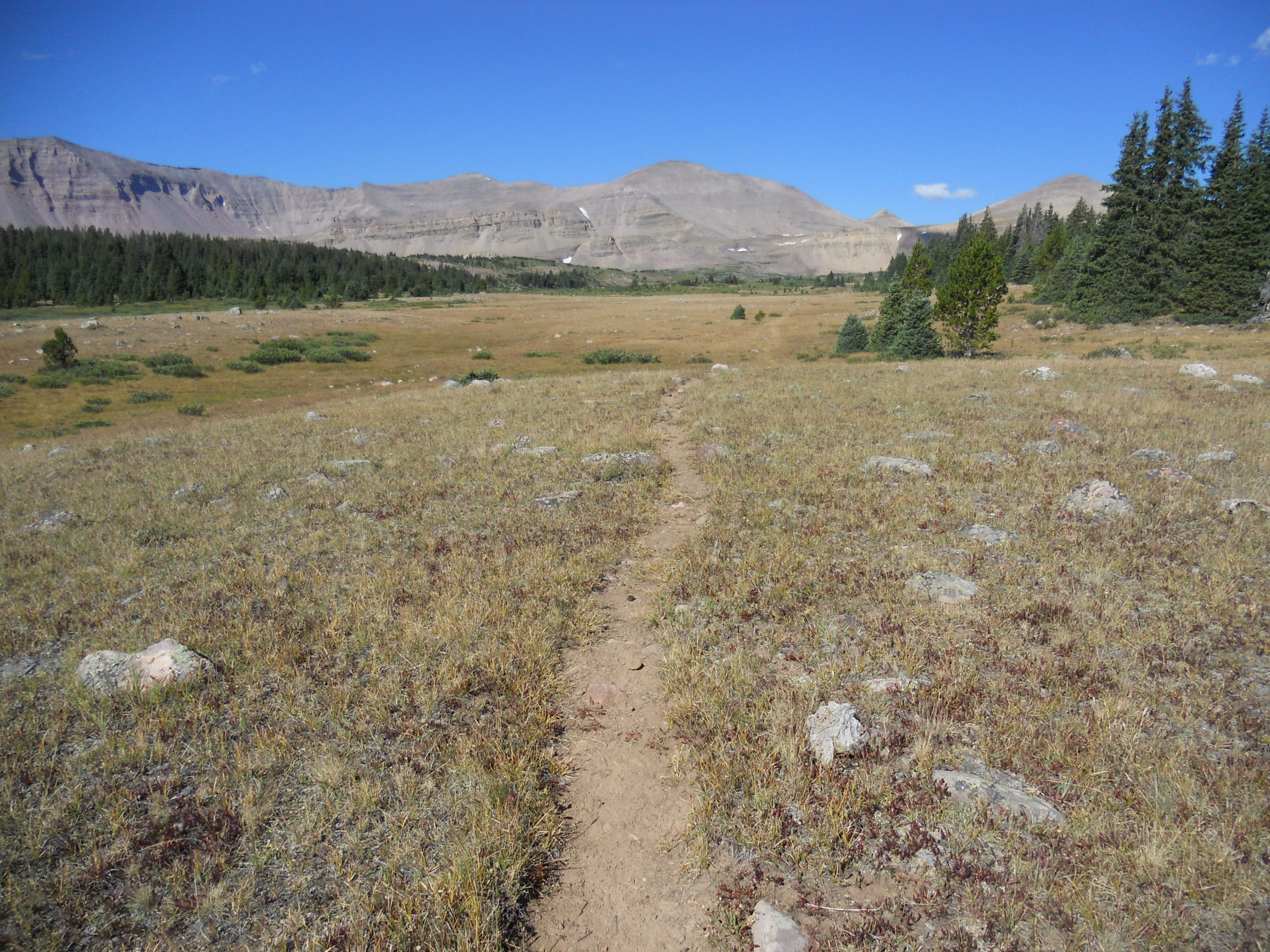
- The Uinta Highline Trail in Painter Basin
- Length: 104 mi (167 km)
- Location: Uinta Mountains, Utah, USA
- Trailheads: McKee Draw, U.S. Route 191; Hayden Pass, Utah Route 150
- Use: backpacking, hiking, horseback riding, trail running
- Elevation change: 16,700 ft (5,090 m)
- Highest point: Anderson Pass, 12,700 ft (3,871 m)
- Lowest point: McKee Draw (eastern terminus), 8,240 ft (2,512 m)
- Difficulty: Moderate to strenuous
- Months: July to September
- Sights: Kings Peak (highest peak in Utah), High Uintas Wilderness
- Hazards: Snowmelt and icy slopes early in the season, severe weather, altitude

The Uinta Highline Trail is a trail in the Uinta Mountains of Utah that traverses the range 104 miles (167 km) from east to west. The trail passes through expansive alpine landscapes dominated by metasedimentary rocks sculpted by past glaciers. The broad glacial basins are dotted by hundreds of lakes.

== Route ==
The Uinta Highline Trail extends 104 miles (167 km) along the east–west oriented crest of the Uinta Mountains. The eastern terminus is at McKee Draw along U.S. Route 191, between Flaming Gorge Reservoir and Vernal. The western terminus is at Hayden Pass near Mirror Lake on Utah Route 150;. The trail crosses eight named passes that exceed 11,200 feet (3,414 m) elevation and many other smaller saddles and ridges. Between these high points, the trail drops into broad, glacially carved basins and valleys. The high point of the trail is at Anderson Pass (12,700 feet (3,871 m) elevation), and Kings Peak (elevation 13,528 feet (4,123 m)), the high point of Utah, is located just 0.7 miles (1.1 km) south of the pass. Altogether, there is 16,700 feet (5,090 m) of elevation gain and 14,600 feet (4,450 m) of elevation loss on an east-to-west trip. The average elevation of the trail is 10,700 feet (3,261 m).

The Uinta Highline Trail passes through a mosaic of forests, subalpine meadows, alpine tundra, and rock and snow fields, but the striking character of the trail is its openness and expansive views—treeless terrain accounts for over half the distance of the trail.

The trail is designated as Trail 025 for the 96 miles (154 km) it passes through the Ashley National Forest and Trail 083 for the 8 miles (13 km) it passes through the Wasatch-Cache National Forest, with Rocky Sea Pass being the dividing line. Over half the route is located in the High Uintas Wilderness where travel is limited to those on foot and horseback.

== Hiking ==
The Uinta Highline Trail can be hiked in either direction, but hikers of its entire 104-mile length more often hike east to west. The trail starts at the Highline Trailhead in McKee Draw, just 0.5 miles west of U.S. Highway 191 on Forest Road 062. A vault toilet and parking area are at the trailhead. The first 25 miles (40 km) of trail pass through forest and subalpine meadows, and there can be limited sources of water, particularly late in the season. After crossing Little Brush Creek at mile 4.3, the next source of water may be over 20 miles (32 km) away near Leidy Peak. There, Hacking Lake is a short hike off the trail.

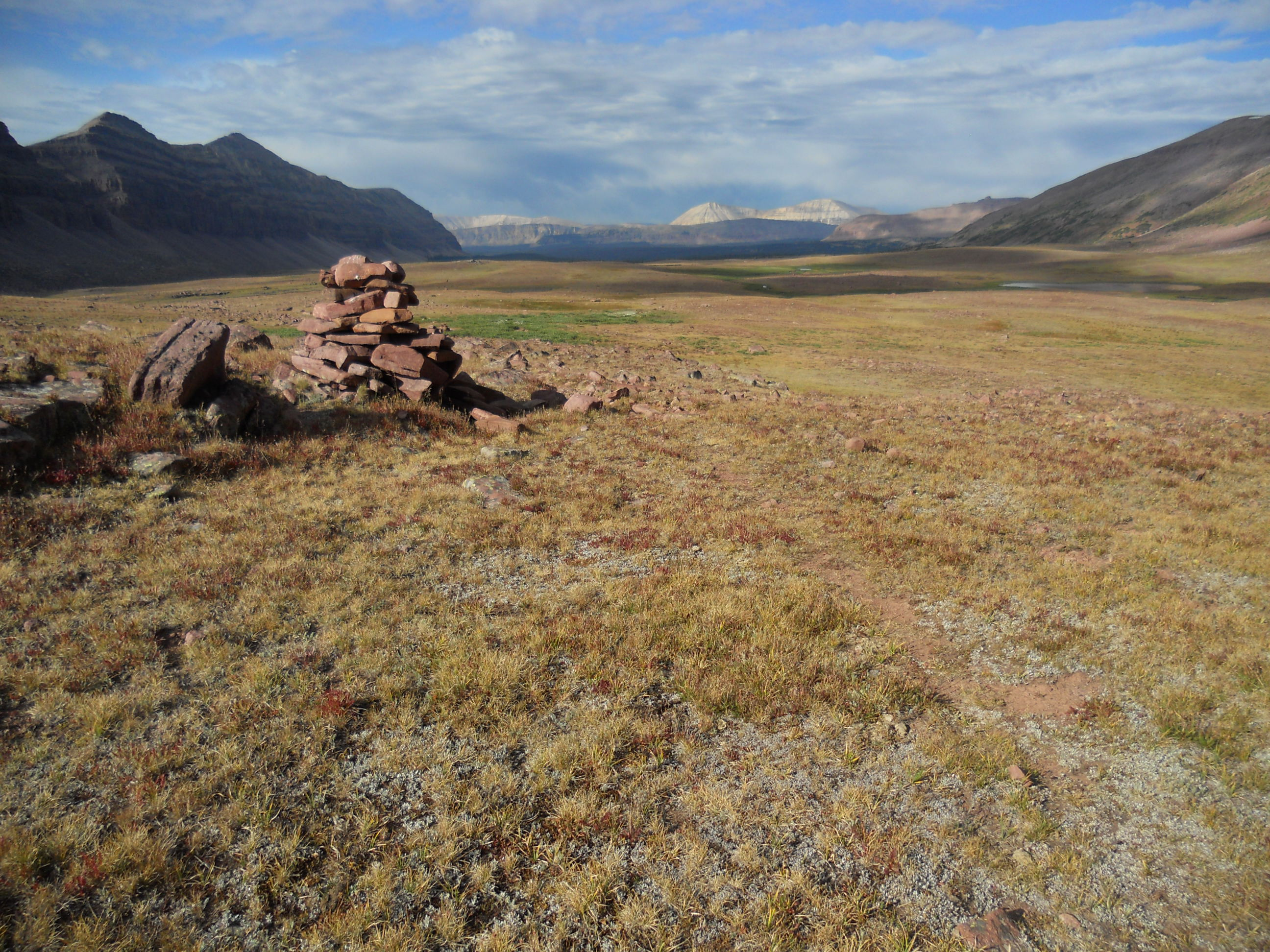
Large cairns help mark the path when above treeline

From Leidy Peak westward, the trail crosses long stretches of alpine tundra, rocky passes, and subalpine forests. Numerous lakes and streams serve as water sources.

The trail ends at the Highline Trailhead at Hayden Pass on the Mirror Lake Scenic Byway (Utah Route 150). A vault toilet and parking area are located at the trailhead. This is a busy trailhead, particularly on summer weekends, and is within a federal fee area requiring a day pass (may be purchased at a couple locations along the Mirror Lake Scenic Byway) or an annual America the Beautiful Pass.

The Uinta Highline Trail passes two additional trailheads. Both are many miles from paved highways and are reached by gravel roads. The Leidy Peak trailhead is at mile 24. The Chepeta Lake trailhead is at mile 38. Starting at one of these trailheads shortens the westward hike to Hayden Pass to 80 miles (130 km) or 66 miles (106 km), respectively. In the past some users have chosen to shorten the distance traveled due to the unmaintained condition of the far eastern portion of the trail. However, since 2013 the trail from US Highway 191 to Leidy Peak has been improved through the efforts of volunteers from Vernal, Utah.

There is no permit required to hike the Uinta Highline Trail.

The Uinta Highline Trail has a remote, primitive character. In places, the trail lacks tread and is merely a route marked with occasional cairns, posts, or signs. This can be attractive to users who seek solitude and have the necessary navigation skills.

== Gallery ==
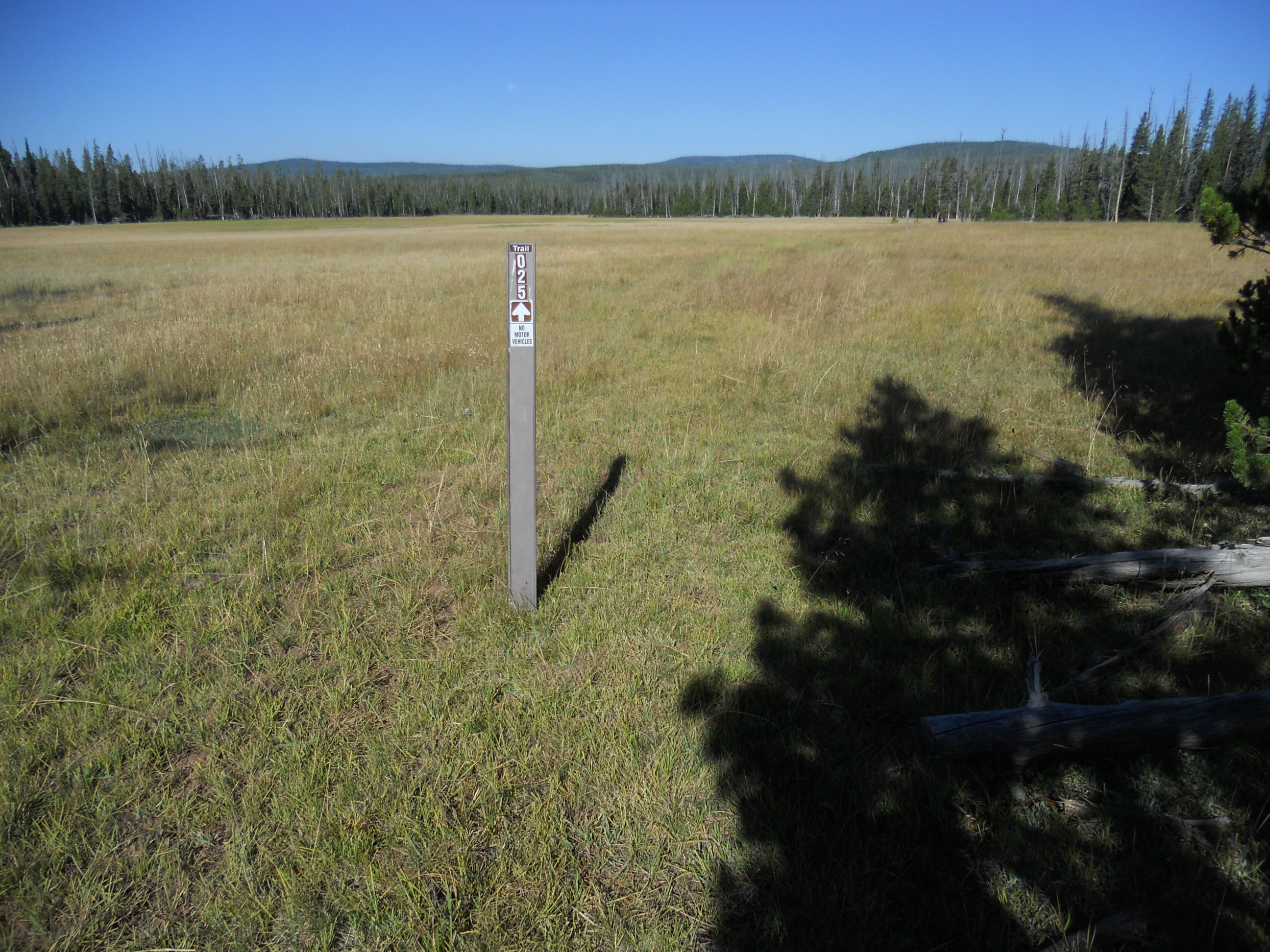
The trail through Big Park.

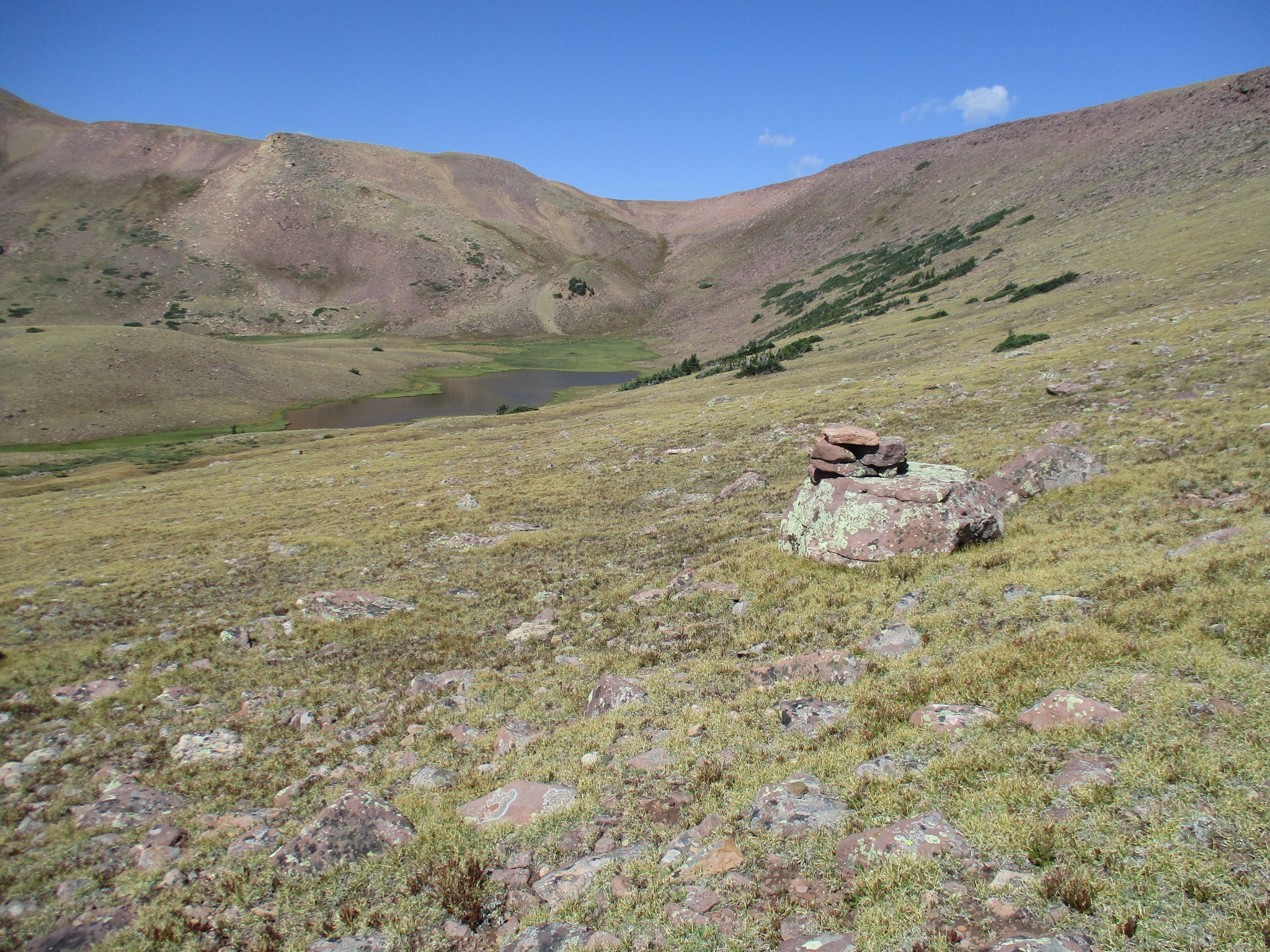
Cairns mark the path to Gabbro Pass.

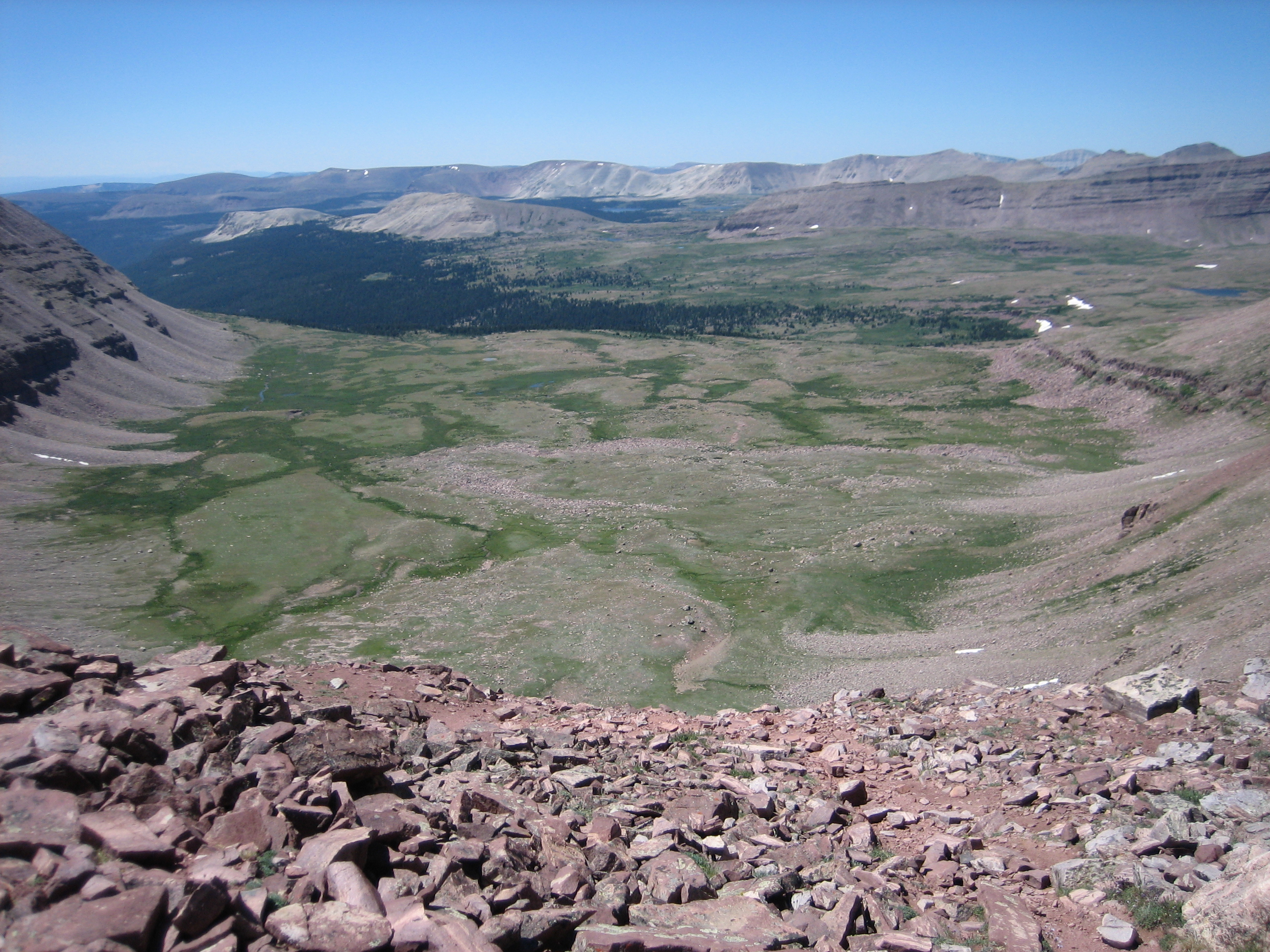
View from Anderson Pass, the high point of the trail.

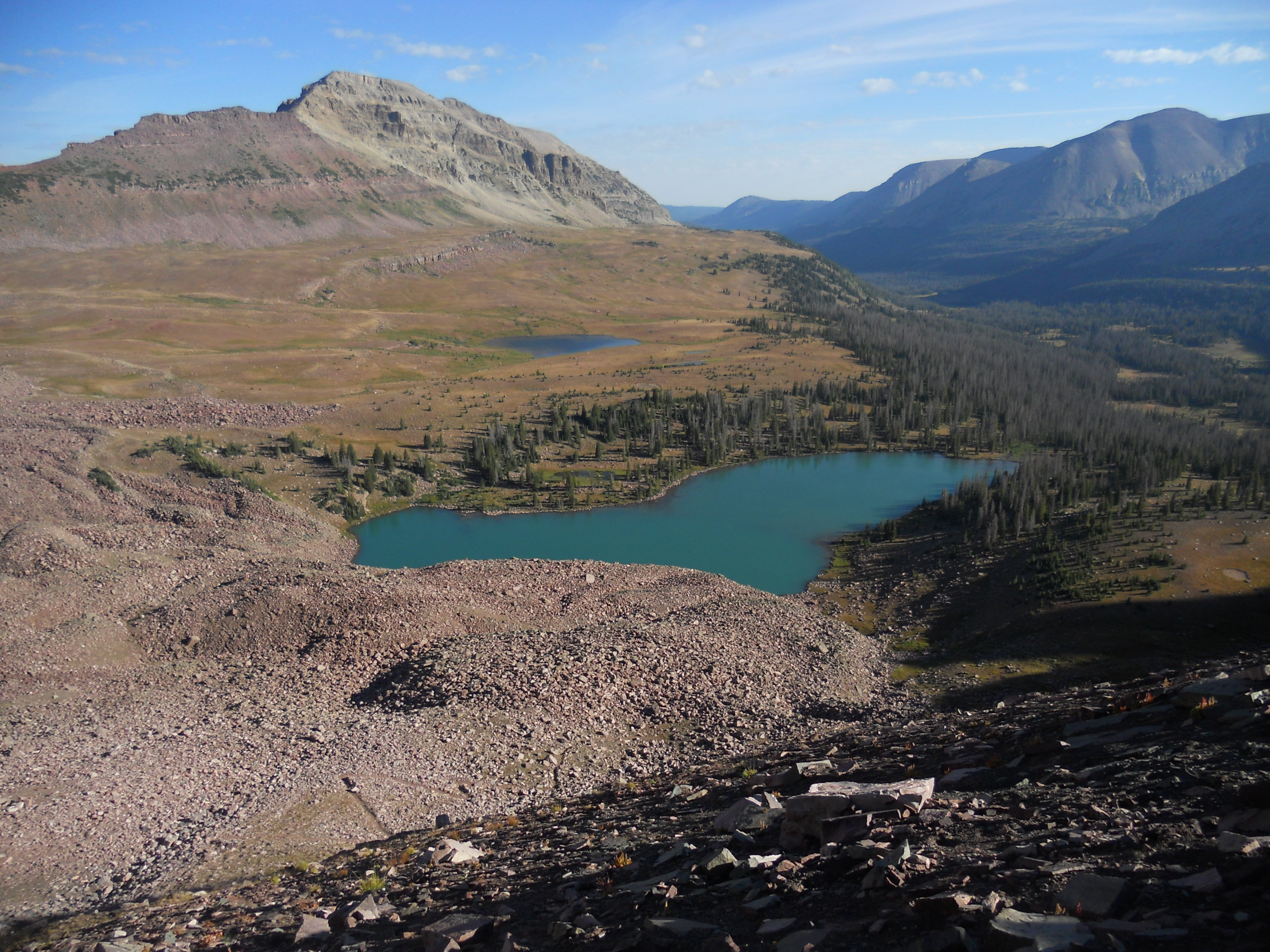
View from the trail at Dead Horse Pass.

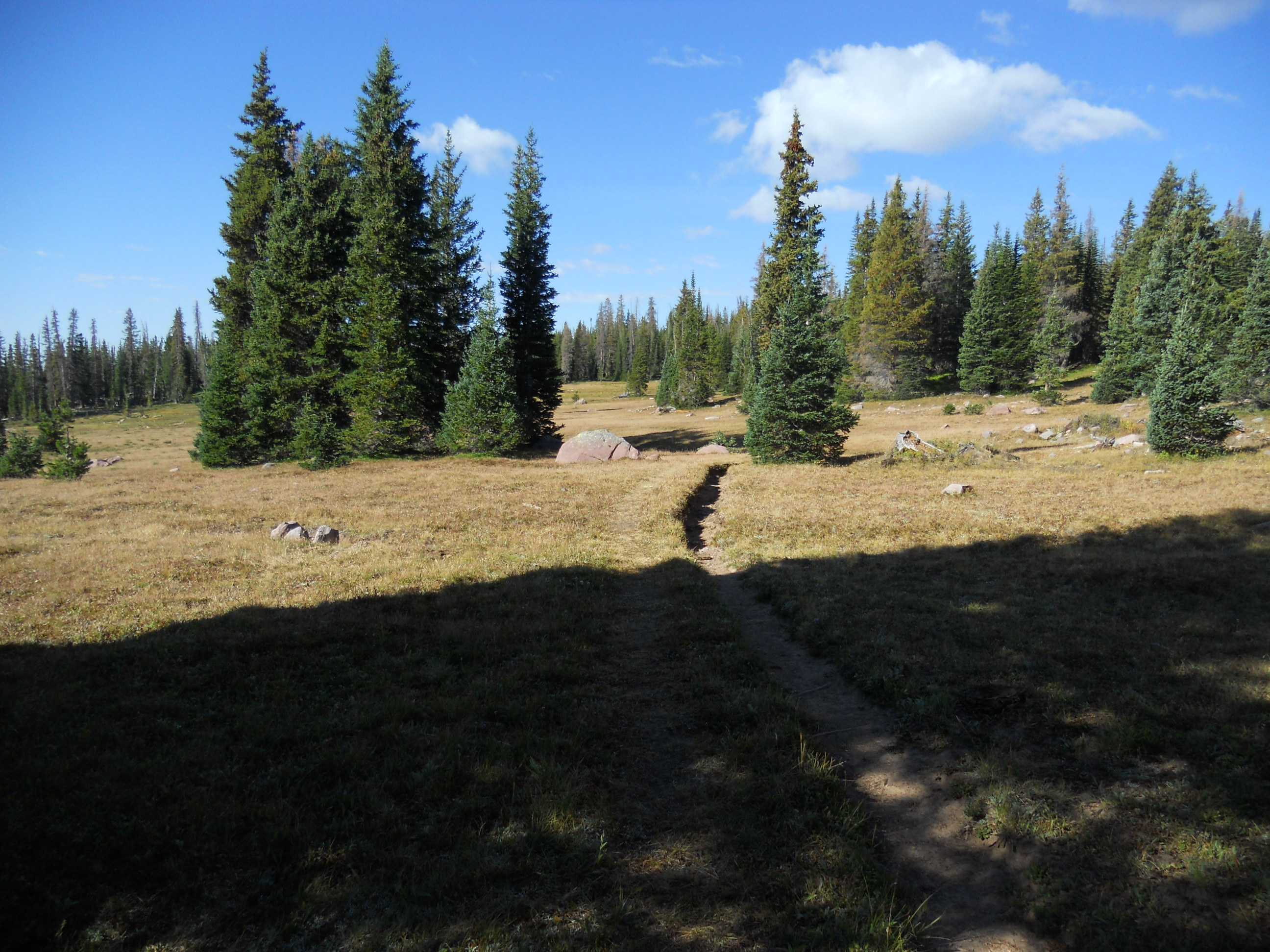
The trail through Fall Creek Basin.

== See also ==
- Ashley National Forest
- High Uintas Wilderness
- Uinta Mountains
