= Samak, Utah =

- CDP
- Location in Summit County and the state of Utah
- Coordinates: 40°38′24″N 111°14′52″W
- Country: United States
- State: Utah
- County: Summit
- Named for: Kamas backwards

Area
  - Total: 4.7 sq mi (12.1 km^{2})
  - Land: 4.7 sq mi (12.1 km^{2})
  - Water: 0 sq mi (0.0 km^{2})
- Elevation: 7,454 ft (2,272 m)

Population (2020)
  - Total: 93
  - Density: 20/sq mi (7.7/km^{2})
- Time zone: UTC-7 (Mountain (MST))
  - Summer (DST): UTC-6 (MDT)
- ZIP code: 84036
- Area code: 435
- FIPS code: 49-67400
- GNIS feature ID: 2409244

Samak is a census-designated place (CDP) in southwestern Summit County, Utah, United States. The population was 93 at the 2020 census. The name is simply the reversal of the name of the nearby city of Kamas.

== Geography ==
According to the United States Census Bureau, the CDP has a total area of 4.7 square miles (12 km^{2}), all land.

=== Climate ===
The Beaver Divide SNOTEL weather station is located along the lower section of Bald Mountain Pass, roughly 5 miles (8 km) east of Samak.

Climate data for Beaver Divide, Utah, 1991–2020 normals: 8280ft (2524m)
Month	Jan	Feb	Mar	Apr	May	Jun	Jul	Aug	Sep	Oct	Nov	Dec	Year
Mean daily maximum °F (°C)	32.9 (0.5)	36.1 (2.3)	43.7 (6.5)	48.7 (9.3)	58.2 (14.6)	69.6 (20.9)	78.2 (25.7)	76.3 (24.6)	66.6 (19.2)	52.7 (11.5)	39.6 (4.2)	31.2 (−0.4)	52.8 (11.6)
Daily mean °F (°C)	22.6 (−5.2)	24.5 (−4.2)	31.2 (−0.4)	36.3 (2.4)	45.3 (7.4)	54.7 (12.6)	62.8 (17.1)	61.3 (16.3)	52.7 (11.5)	40.9 (4.9)	29.4 (−1.4)	21.5 (−5.8)	40.3 (4.6)
Mean daily minimum °F (°C)	12.3 (−10.9)	12.9 (−10.6)	18.6 (−7.4)	23.9 (−4.5)	32.5 (0.3)	39.8 (4.3)	47.3 (8.5)	46.3 (7.9)	38.7 (3.7)	29.2 (−1.6)	19.2 (−7.1)	11.9 (−11.2)	27.7 (−2.4)
Average precipitation inches (mm)	3.37 (86)	2.65 (67)	2.72 (69)	3.02 (77)	2.26 (57)	1.32 (34)	1.14 (29)	1.55 (39)	1.96 (50)	2.05 (52)	2.52 (64)	3.01 (76)	27.57 (700)
Source 1: XMACIS2
Source 2: NOAA (Precipitation)

== Demographics ==
Historical population
Census	Pop.	Note	%±
2000	161		—
2010	287		78.3%
2020	93		−67.6%
Source: U.S. Census Bureau

As of the census of 2000, there were 161 people, 72 households, and 42 families residing in the CDP. The population density was 34.3 people per square mile (13.2/km^{2}). There were 249 housing units at an average density of 53.1/sq mi (20.5/km^{2}). The racial makeup of the CDP was 98.76% White, 0.62% from other races, and 0.62% from two or more races. Hispanic or Latino of any race were 2.48% of the population.

There were 72 households, out of which 22.2% had children under the age of 18 living with them, 51.4% were married couples living together, 5.6% had a female householder with no husband present, and 40.3% were non-families. 26.4% of all households were made up of individuals, and 2.8% had someone living alone who was 65 years of age or older. The average household size was 2.24 and the average family size was 2.81.

In the CDP, the population was spread out, with 18.6% under the age of 18, 5.6% from 18 to 24, 44.7% from 25 to 44, 23.0% from 45 to 64, and 8.1% who were 65 years of age or older. The median age was 37 years. For every 100 females, there were 106.4 males. For every 100 females age 18 and over, there were 107.9 males.

The median income for a household in the CDP was $40,938, and the median income for a family was $55,938. Males had a median income of $37,188 versus $21,389 for females. The per capita income for the CDP was $15,615. About 9.1% of families and 11.3% of the population were below the poverty line, including 19.8% of those under the age of eighteen and none of those 65 or over.

A small section of houses by the side of Highway 150 actually belongs to unincorporated Summit County, although they are typically treated as being part of Samak for statistical and other purposes.

== Local attractions ==
The Mirror Lake Highway, a scenic byway that connects Kamas, Utah with Evanston, Wyoming, winds through the heart of Samak. Every summer in mid-June, the highway is used as a route for the mountain stage of the annual High Uintas Classic, a two-day bicycle race that takes participants from Kamas to Evanston.

A sign reading "Beaver Creek Nudist Ranch" is located at the entrance to Samak on Highway 150 just outside the city limits of Kamas. An actual nudist ranch is not known to exist in Samak.

== Education ==
It is in the South Summit School District.

== See also ==
- List of census-designated places in Utah
