= Henrys Fork (Green River tributary) =

Coordinates: 40°59′57″N 109°38′51″W

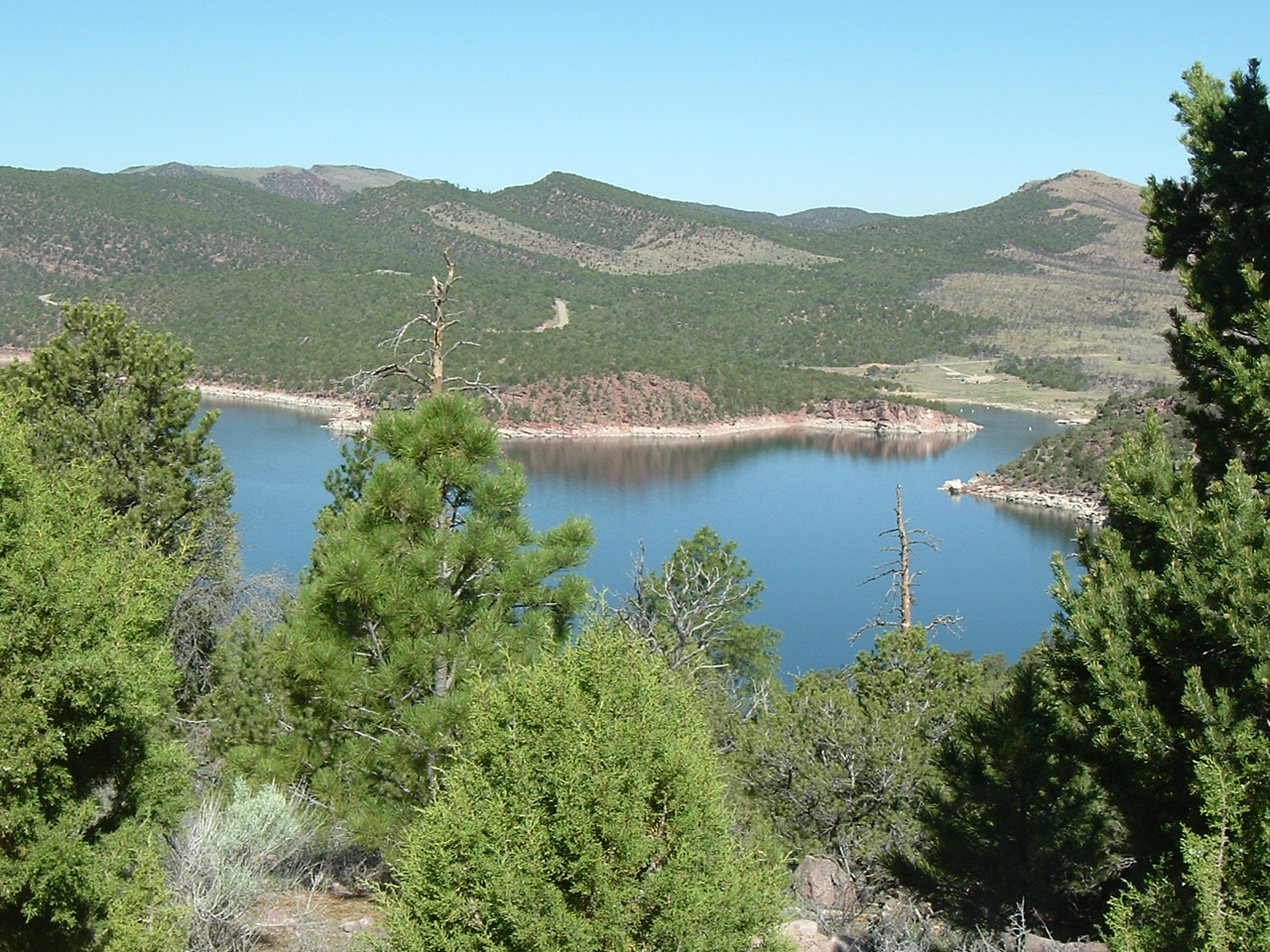
Flaming Gorge Reservoir

Henrys Fork is a 61-mile (98 km) long tributary of the Green River in Utah and Wyoming. Originating near Henrys Fork Peak in the Uinta Mountains of Utah, the river flows north into Wyoming, where it turns east, passing Lonetree, Burntfork, and McKinnon. Near Manila, Utah, the river loops back south into Utah, emptying into the Flaming Gorge Reservoir where it joins the Green River.

The major tributaries of Henrys Fork are Beaver Creek and Burnt Fork, which both rise in the Uinta Mountains. Water from the river is used primarily to irrigate pasture.

Henry's Fork is believed to be named for Andrew Henry. The first annual rendezvous was held in 1825 along the river.

== See also ==
- List of rivers of Utah
- List of rivers of Wyoming
