= South Kings Peak =

Mountain in the American state of Utah

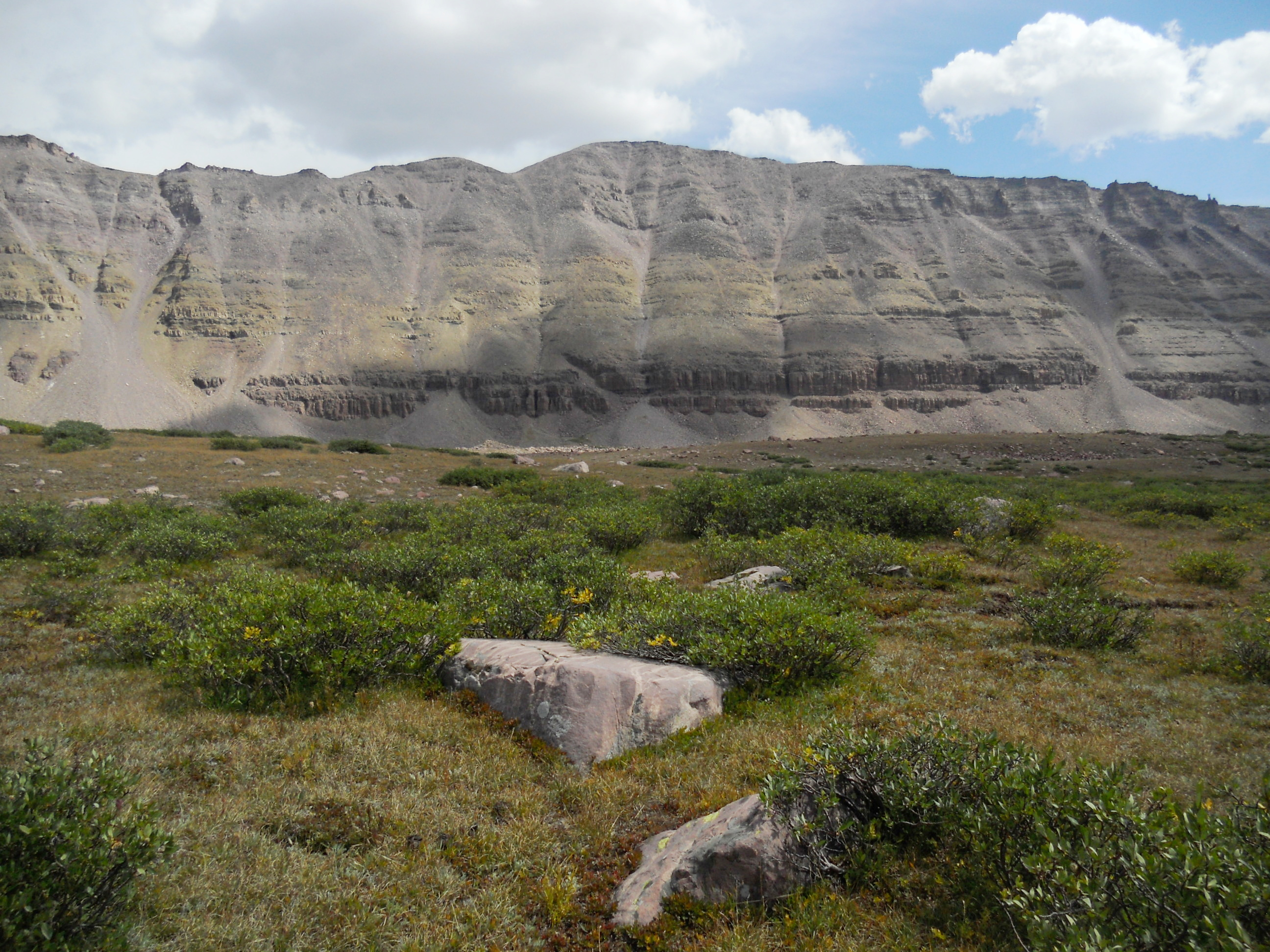
- South Kings Peak viewed from the west

Highest point
- Elevation: 13,518 ft (4,120 m) NAVD 88
- Prominence: 352 ft (107 m)
- Coordinates: 40°45′57″N 110°22′40″W

Geography
- Location within Utah
- Location: Duchesne County, Utah, U.S.
- Parent range: Uinta Mountains
- Topo map: USGS Mount Powell

South Kings Peak is the second-highest mountain in the U.S. state of Utah, With an elevation of 13,518 feet (4,120 m). It is located in north-central Duchesne County, immediately south of Kings Peak, the state's highest mountain, and is part of the Uinta Mountains within Ashley National Forest and the High Uintas Wilderness.

== See also ==
- Kings Peak
