= Mirror Lake (Uinta Mountains) =

Lake in the state of Utah, United States

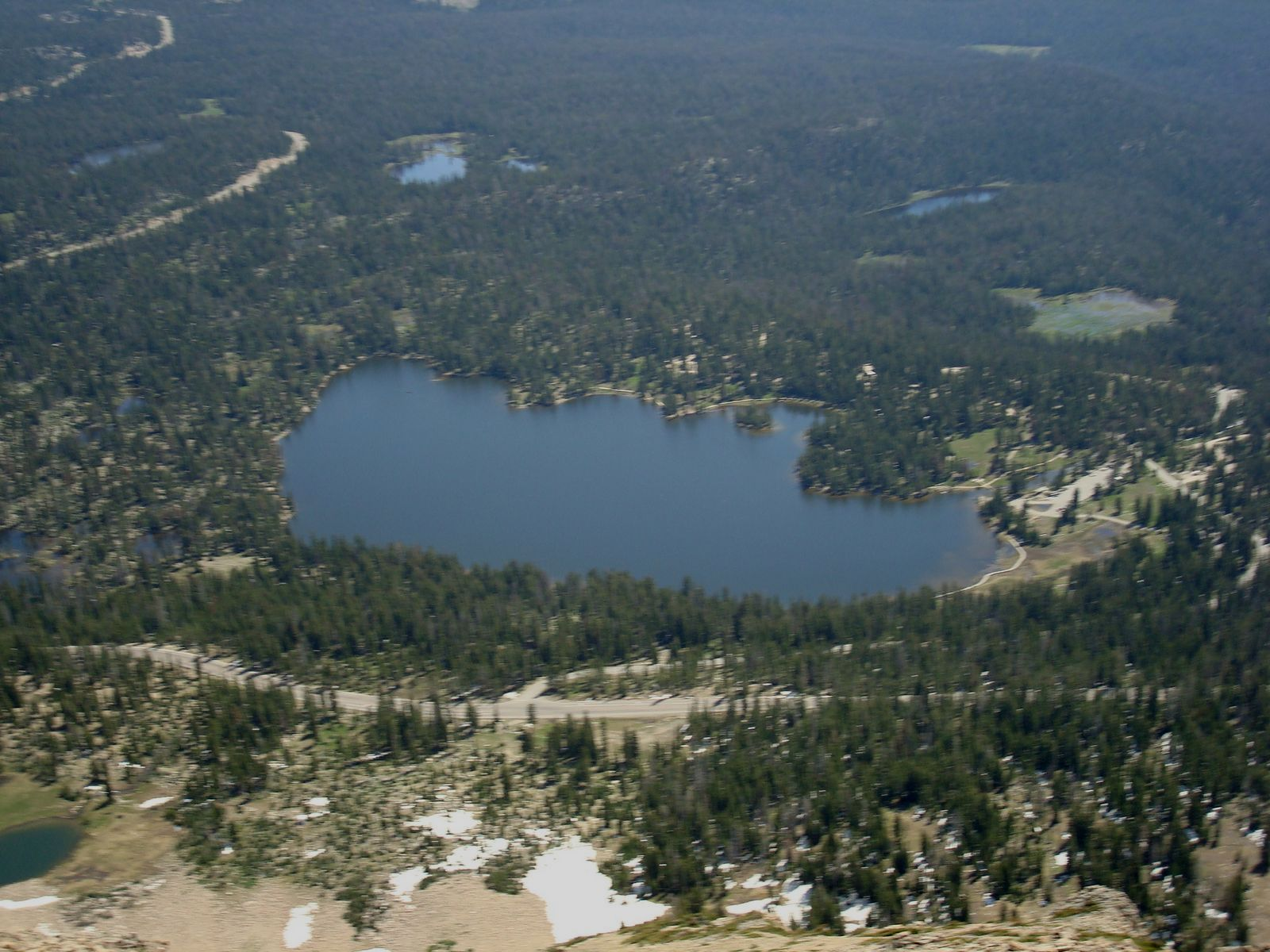
- Mirror Lake as seen from Bald Mountain. The Mirror Lake Highway is in the foreground and top left.

- Location within Utah Location within the United States
- Location: Uinta Mountains, Duchesne County, Utah, US
- Coordinates: 40°42′16.51″N 110°53′17.47″W
- Basin countries: United States
- Surface area: 53.4 acres (0.216 km^{2})
- Max. depth: 36 ft (11 m)
- Surface elevation: 10,050 ft (3,060 m)

Mirror Lake is a lake in the high Uinta Mountains in Utah. It is a popular fishing and recreation spot. The lake contains three species of trout: rainbow, brook, and tiger. The lake has a Forest Service campground, picnic facilities, and a boat ramp for non-motorized watercraft. Access to the lake is by the Mirror Lake Highway, which is only open during the summer (other than by snowmobile).

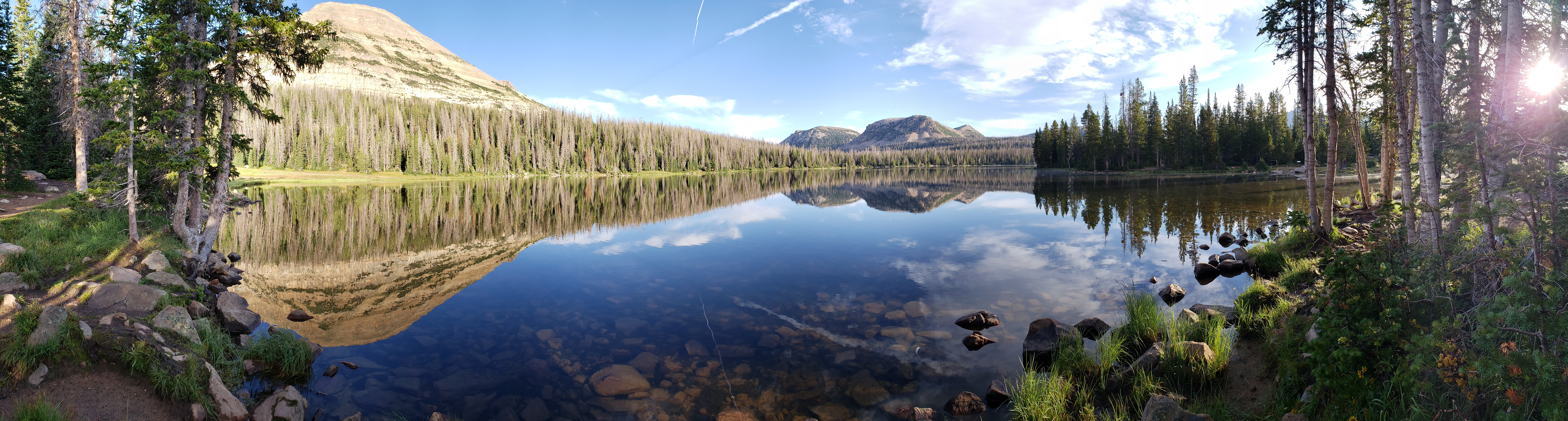
Mirror Lake with Bald Mountain in the background

The lake's name comes from the near-perfect reflection of the surrounding mountains and trees seen from a roadside overlook or from the shore. The shoreline is owned by the Uinta-Wasatch-Cache National Forest.

Mirror Lake includes the adjacent Mirror Lake Campground, with latrines, day-use areas and 94 campsites. The water that enters the lake is overflow from Pass Lake located just above Mirror Lake. The outflow is the headwaters of the Duchesne River.
