= Bald Mountain (Uinta Range) =

Mountain in Summit and Duchesne counties in Utah, United States

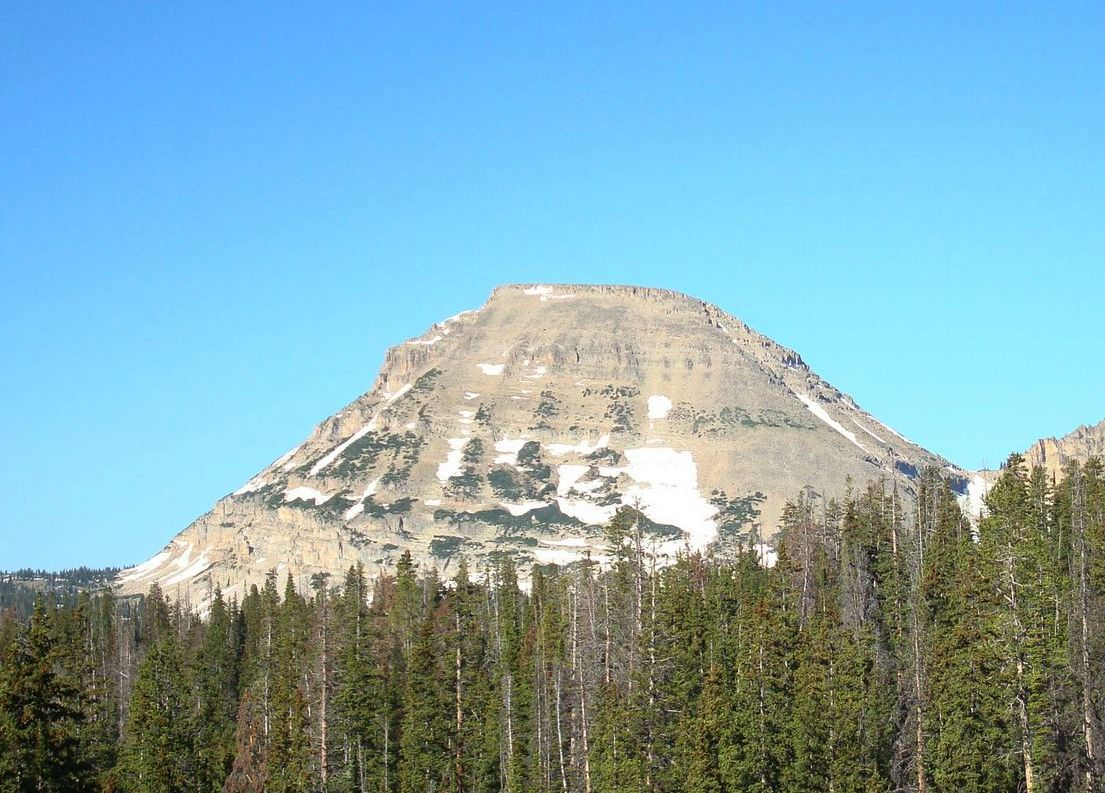
- The east face of Bald Mountain, July 2008

Highest point
- Elevation: 11,948 ft (3,642 m) NAVD 88
- Prominence: 1,823 ft (556 m)
- Coordinates: 40°41′56″N 110°54′09″W

Geography
- Location within Utah
- Location: Duchesne / Summit counties, Utah; United States
- Parent range: Uinta Mountains
- Topo map: USGS Mirror Lake

Climbing
- Easiest route: Hike

Bald Mountain is a 11,949-foot (3,642 m) peak in the western Uinta Mountain Range in the Uinta-Wasatch-Cache National Forest on the border between Summit and Wasatch counties in northeastern Utah, United States.

== Description ==
The mountain has a prominence of 1,823 feet (556 m) and is home to mountain goats, pika, and a number of species of wildflowers. Utah State Route 150 (SR‑150) passes just east of the mountain.

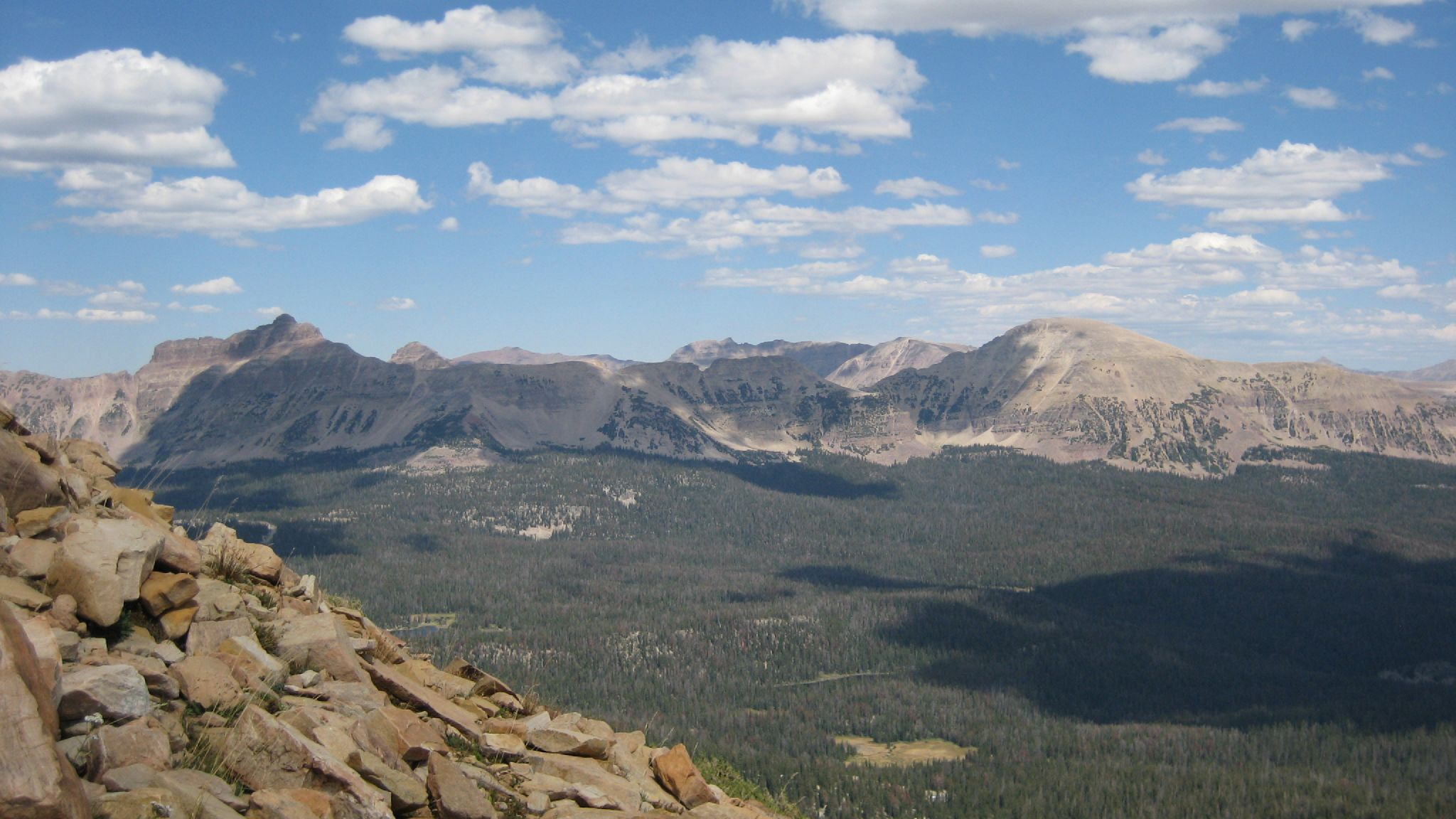
View from Bald Mountain Trail, August 2007

== Climate ==
Climate data for Bald Mountain 40.6995 N, 110.8990 W, Elevation: 11,083 ft (3,378 m) (1991–2020 normals)
Month	Jan	Feb	Mar	Apr	May	Jun	Jul	Aug	Sep	Oct	Nov	Dec	Year
Mean daily maximum °F (°C)	26.9 (−2.8)	27.3 (−2.6)	33.4 (0.8)	38.7 (3.7)	47.2 (8.4)	58.1 (14.5)	66.3 (19.1)	64.7 (18.2)	56.4 (13.6)	44.4 (6.9)	33.2 (0.7)	26.2 (−3.2)	43.6 (6.4)
Daily mean °F (°C)	16.3 (−8.7)	15.8 (−9.0)	21.1 (−6.1)	26.1 (−3.3)	34.9 (1.6)	45.3 (7.4)	53.2 (11.8)	51.7 (10.9)	43.9 (6.6)	33.0 (0.6)	22.7 (−5.2)	15.8 (−9.0)	31.6 (−0.2)
Mean daily minimum °F (°C)	5.6 (−14.7)	4.3 (−15.4)	8.8 (−12.9)	13.5 (−10.3)	22.6 (−5.2)	32.4 (0.2)	40.1 (4.5)	38.8 (3.8)	31.3 (−0.4)	21.6 (−5.8)	12.1 (−11.1)	5.5 (−14.7)	19.7 (−6.8)
Average precipitation inches (mm)	4.58 (116)	3.99 (101)	3.87 (98)	4.11 (104)	3.46 (88)	2.05 (52)	1.87 (47)	2.20 (56)	2.80 (71)	3.14 (80)	3.49 (89)	4.03 (102)	39.59 (1,004)
Source: PRISM Climate Group

== Bald Mountain Trail ==
The summit can be reached by the Bald Mountain Trail (National Forest Trail 3202), beginning at Bald Mountain Pass on SR‑150,. The trail provides views of the surrounding areas. The maintained trail gains 1,250 feet (381 m) of elevation in 1.4 miles (2.3 km) and due to the high elevation (the trailhead is about 10,700 feet [3,300 m] above sea level) it is a moderately strenuous hike with no shade. The hike to the summit can be completed in 2 to 3 hours round trip. The trail does commonly have snow.

== See also ==
- List of mountains in Utah
- Reids Peak
