= Bald Mountain Pass =

Mountain pass in Utah, United States

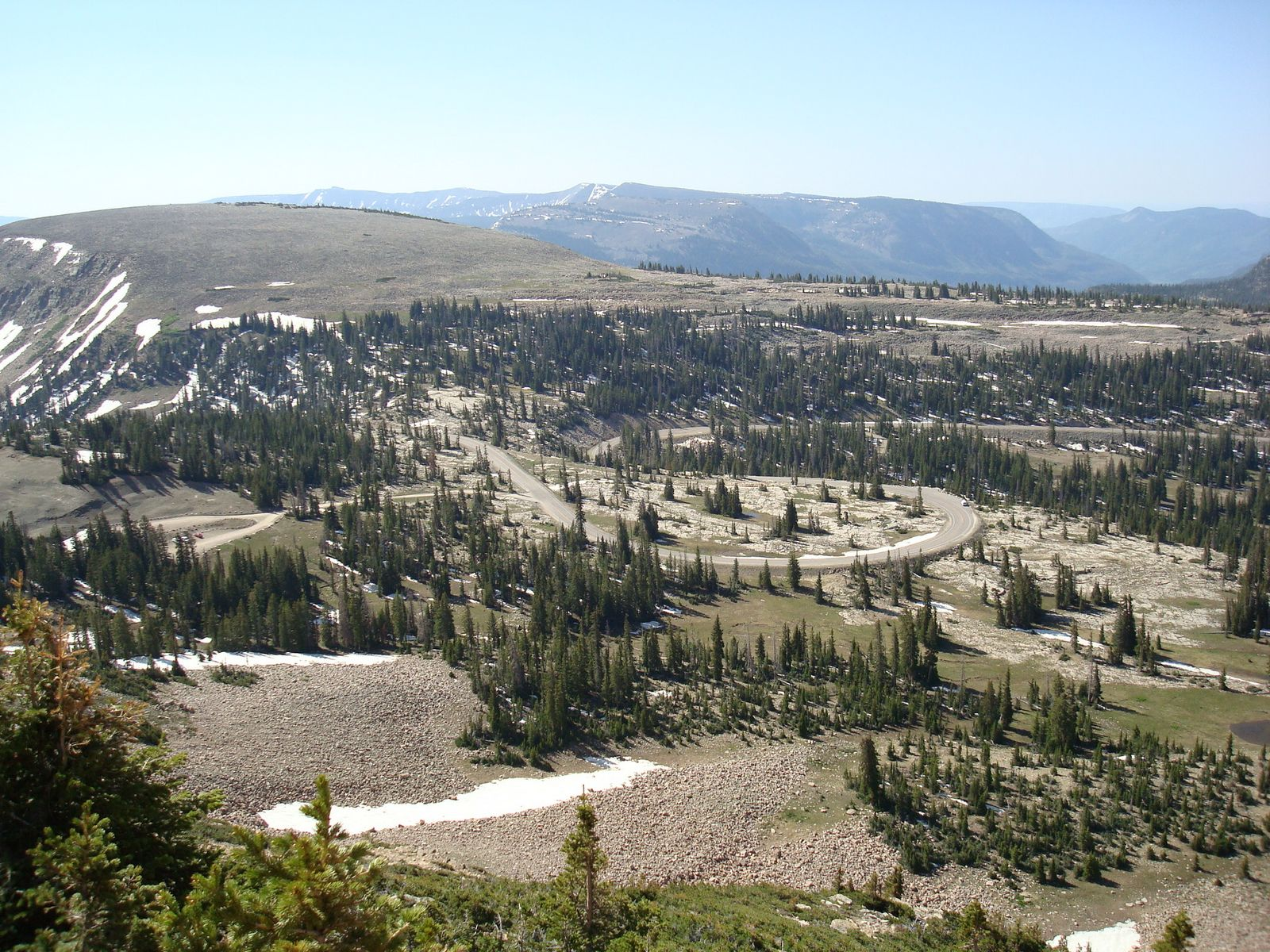
- Interactive map of Bald Mountain Pass
- Elevation: 10,715 ft (3,266 m)
- Traversed by: SR-150 (Mirror Lake Highway)

Third Approach
- Location: Duchesne County, Utah; United States
- Range: Uinta Mountains
- Coordinates: 40°41′18″N 110°53′53″W

Bald Mountain Pass (elevation 10,715 feet [3,266 m]) is a high mountain pass in the high Uinta Mountains in Duchesne County in eastern Utah. United States. It is the highest point on the Mirror Lake Highway (Utah State Route 150), near the trailhead for Bald Mountain. The highway is the highest paved road in Utah.

== Climate ==
Climate data for Bald Mountain Pass 40.6914 N, 110.8981 W, Elevation: 10,719 ft (3,267 m) (1991–2020 normals)
Month	Jan	Feb	Mar	Apr	May	Jun	Jul	Aug	Sep	Oct	Nov	Dec	Year
Mean daily maximum °F (°C)	27.8 (−2.3)	28.6 (−1.9)	34.9 (1.6)	40.4 (4.7)	48.7 (9.3)	59.6 (15.3)	67.9 (19.9)	66.1 (18.9)	57.8 (14.3)	45.5 (7.5)	34.2 (1.2)	26.9 (−2.8)	44.9 (7.1)
Daily mean °F (°C)	16.8 (−8.4)	16.6 (−8.6)	22.0 (−5.6)	27.3 (−2.6)	36.1 (2.3)	46.2 (7.9)	54.1 (12.3)	52.6 (11.4)	44.8 (7.1)	33.9 (1.1)	23.2 (−4.9)	16.2 (−8.8)	32.5 (0.3)
Mean daily minimum °F (°C)	5.8 (−14.6)	4.7 (−15.2)	9.1 (−12.7)	14.2 (−9.9)	23.4 (−4.8)	32.7 (0.4)	40.3 (4.6)	39.0 (3.9)	31.9 (−0.1)	22.2 (−5.4)	12.2 (−11.0)	5.5 (−14.7)	20.1 (−6.6)
Average precipitation inches (mm)	4.83 (123)	4.22 (107)	4.06 (103)	4.30 (109)	3.56 (90)	1.99 (51)	1.81 (46)	2.32 (59)	2.90 (74)	3.12 (79)	3.64 (92)	4.27 (108)	41.02 (1,041)
Source: PRISM Climate Group

There is a SNOTEL weather station for Trial Lake, situated near the summit of Bald Mountain Pass.

Climate data for Trial Lake, Utah, 1994–2020 normals, 1983-2020 extremes: 9992ft (3046m)
Month	Jan	Feb	Mar	Apr	May	Jun	Jul	Aug	Sep	Oct	Nov	Dec	Year
Record high °F (°C)	53 (12)	58 (14)	84 (29)	86 (30)	77 (25)	82 (28)	89 (32)	83 (28)	78 (26)	72 (22)	60 (16)	53 (12)	89 (32)
Mean maximum °F (°C)	43.0 (6.1)	43.8 (6.6)	52.5 (11.4)	58.7 (14.8)	63.8 (17.7)	72.5 (22.5)	79.0 (26.1)	75.1 (23.9)	71.0 (21.7)	60.9 (16.1)	50.7 (10.4)	42.5 (5.8)	79.9 (26.6)
Mean daily maximum °F (°C)	29.1 (−1.6)	30.9 (−0.6)	39.4 (4.1)	44.3 (6.8)	52.4 (11.3)	62.9 (17.2)	71.2 (21.8)	68.9 (20.5)	60.1 (15.6)	47.4 (8.6)	35.6 (2.0)	27.4 (−2.6)	47.5 (8.6)
Daily mean °F (°C)	19.8 (−6.8)	19.8 (−6.8)	26.5 (−3.1)	31.4 (−0.3)	39.8 (4.3)	49.4 (9.7)	57.6 (14.2)	55.6 (13.1)	47.7 (8.7)	36.6 (2.6)	25.7 (−3.5)	18.3 (−7.6)	35.7 (2.0)
Mean daily minimum °F (°C)	10.2 (−12.1)	8.6 (−13.0)	13.6 (−10.2)	18.6 (−7.4)	27.3 (−2.6)	36.0 (2.2)	44.0 (6.7)	42.3 (5.7)	35.2 (1.8)	25.8 (−3.4)	15.7 (−9.1)	9.1 (−12.7)	23.9 (−4.5)
Mean minimum °F (°C)	−7.6 (−22.0)	−8.6 (−22.6)	−3.6 (−19.8)	2.6 (−16.3)	12.4 (−10.9)	24.2 (−4.3)	35.7 (2.1)	34.2 (1.2)	22.2 (−5.4)	9.3 (−12.6)	−3.3 (−19.6)	−9.4 (−23.0)	−14.3 (−25.7)
Record low °F (°C)	−28 (−33)	−31 (−35)	−17 (−27)	−12 (−24)	−8 (−22)	3 (−16)	15 (−9)	13 (−11)	4 (−16)	−22 (−30)	−28 (−33)	−30 (−34)	−31 (−35)
Average precipitation inches (mm)	4.47 (114)	3.93 (100)	3.65 (93)	3.94 (100)	3.13 (80)	1.73 (44)	1.58 (40)	2.20 (56)	2.52 (64)	2.80 (71)	3.34 (85)	4.25 (108)	37.54 (955)
Source 1: XMACIS2
Source 2: NOAA (Precipitation)
