= Kings Peak (Utah) =

Tallest mountain in Utah, United States

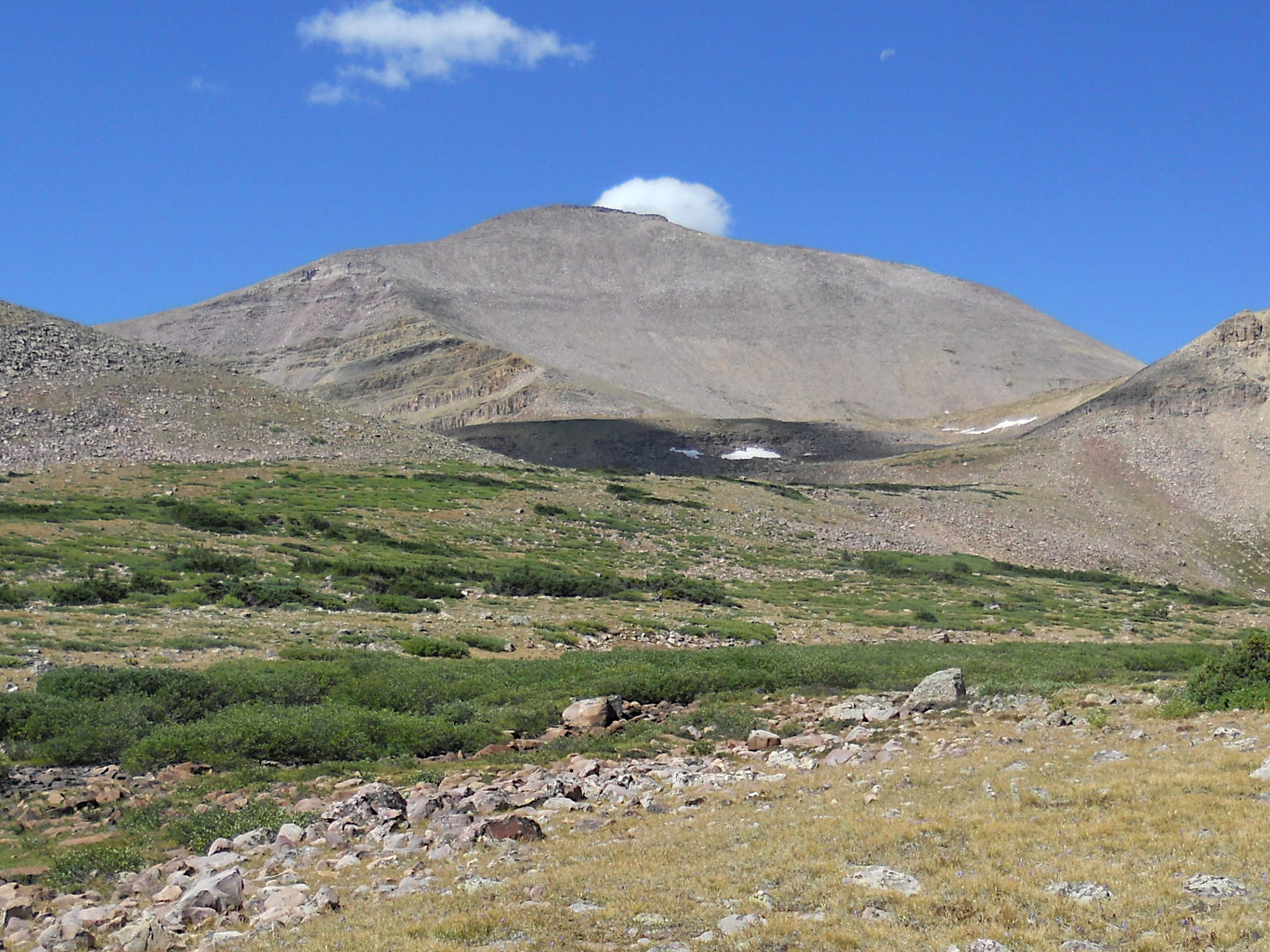
- Kings Peak seen from the east in Painter Basin

Highest point
- Elevation: 13,528 ft (4,123 m) NAVD 88
- Prominence: 6,348 ft (1,935 m)
- Listing: North America highest peaks 93rd; North America isolated peaks 72nd; US highest major peaks 76th; US most prominent peaks 49th; US most isolated peaks 24th; U.S. state high point 7th; Utah county high points 1st
- Coordinates: 40°46′35″N 110°22′22″W

Naming
- Etymology: Clarence King

Geography
- Location within Utah
- Location: Duchesne County, Utah, U.S.
- Parent range: Uinta Mountains
- Topo map: USGS King's Peak

Climbing
- Easiest route: Hike

Kings Peak is a 13,528-foot (4,123 m) mountain in the U.S. state of Utah, the state's highest.

== Description ==
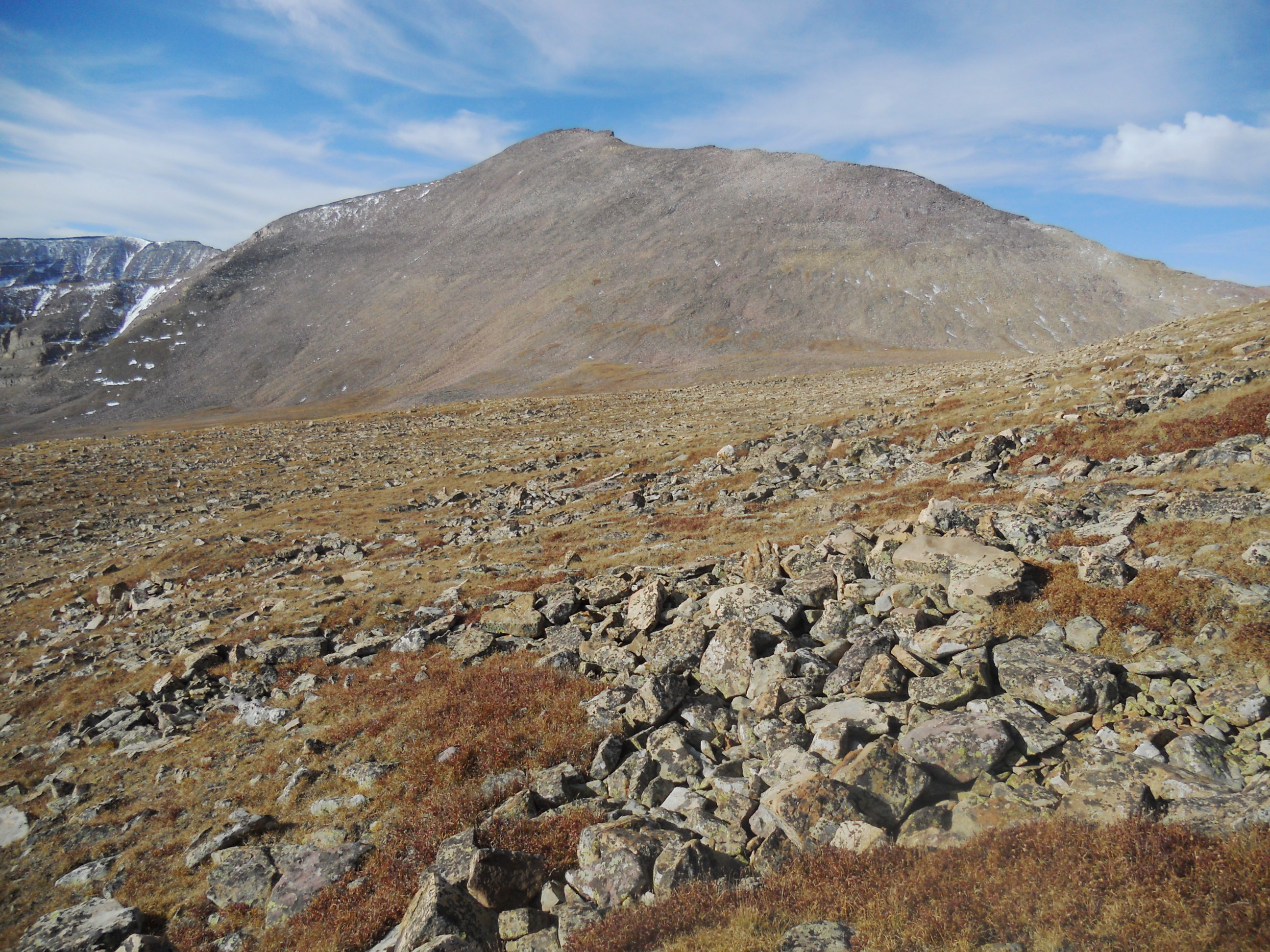
Kings Peak as viewed from the northeast. Anderson Pass is to the right. The north ridge, from Anderson Pass to the summit, is the most popular climbing route.

Kings Peak is located just south of the spine of the central Uinta Mountains, in the Ashley National Forest in northeastern Utah, in north-central Duchesne County. It lies within the boundaries of the High Uintas Wilderness. The peak is approximately 79 miles (127 km) due east of central Salt Lake City, and 45 miles (72 km) due north of the town of Duchesne.

== Climbing ==
There are three popular routes to the summit; a scramble up the east slope, a hike up the northern ridge, and a long but relatively easy hike up the southern slope. The peak was named for Clarence King, a surveyor in the area and the first director of the United States Geological Survey. The easiest route requires a 29 miles (47 km) round trip hike.

== Climate ==
Climate data for Kings Peak 40.7772 N, 110.3732 W, Elevation: 12,969 ft (3,953 m) (1991–2020 normals)
Month	Jan	Feb	Mar	Apr	May	Jun	Jul	Aug	Sep	Oct	Nov	Dec	Year
Mean daily maximum °F (°C)	21.6 (−5.8)	21.7 (−5.7)	27.2 (−2.7)	31.4 (−0.3)	39.7 (4.3)	50.6 (10.3)	58.2 (14.6)	56.6 (13.7)	49.2 (9.6)	38.3 (3.5)	27.7 (−2.4)	21.3 (−5.9)	37.0 (2.8)
Daily mean °F (°C)	11.1 (−11.6)	10.1 (−12.2)	14.9 (−9.5)	19.0 (−7.2)	27.5 (−2.5)	37.8 (3.2)	45.3 (7.4)	43.9 (6.6)	36.7 (2.6)	26.7 (−2.9)	17.3 (−8.2)	11.0 (−11.7)	25.1 (−3.8)
Mean daily minimum °F (°C)	0.6 (−17.4)	−1.4 (−18.6)	2.6 (−16.3)	6.6 (−14.1)	15.2 (−9.3)	25.1 (−3.8)	32.4 (0.2)	31.2 (−0.4)	24.2 (−4.3)	15.1 (−9.4)	7.0 (−13.9)	0.8 (−17.3)	13.3 (−10.4)
Average precipitation inches (mm)	3.24 (82)	3.02 (77)	3.16 (80)	3.90 (99)	4.01 (102)	2.36 (60)	2.79 (71)	3.12 (79)	3.24 (82)	3.37 (86)	3.14 (80)	3.24 (82)	38.59 (980)
Source: PRISM Climate Group

== See also ==
- List of mountain peaks of Utah
- List of U.S. states and territories by elevation
- List of Ultras of the United States
- South Kings Peak
