= Uinta Mountains =

Mountain range in Utah and Colorado in the United States

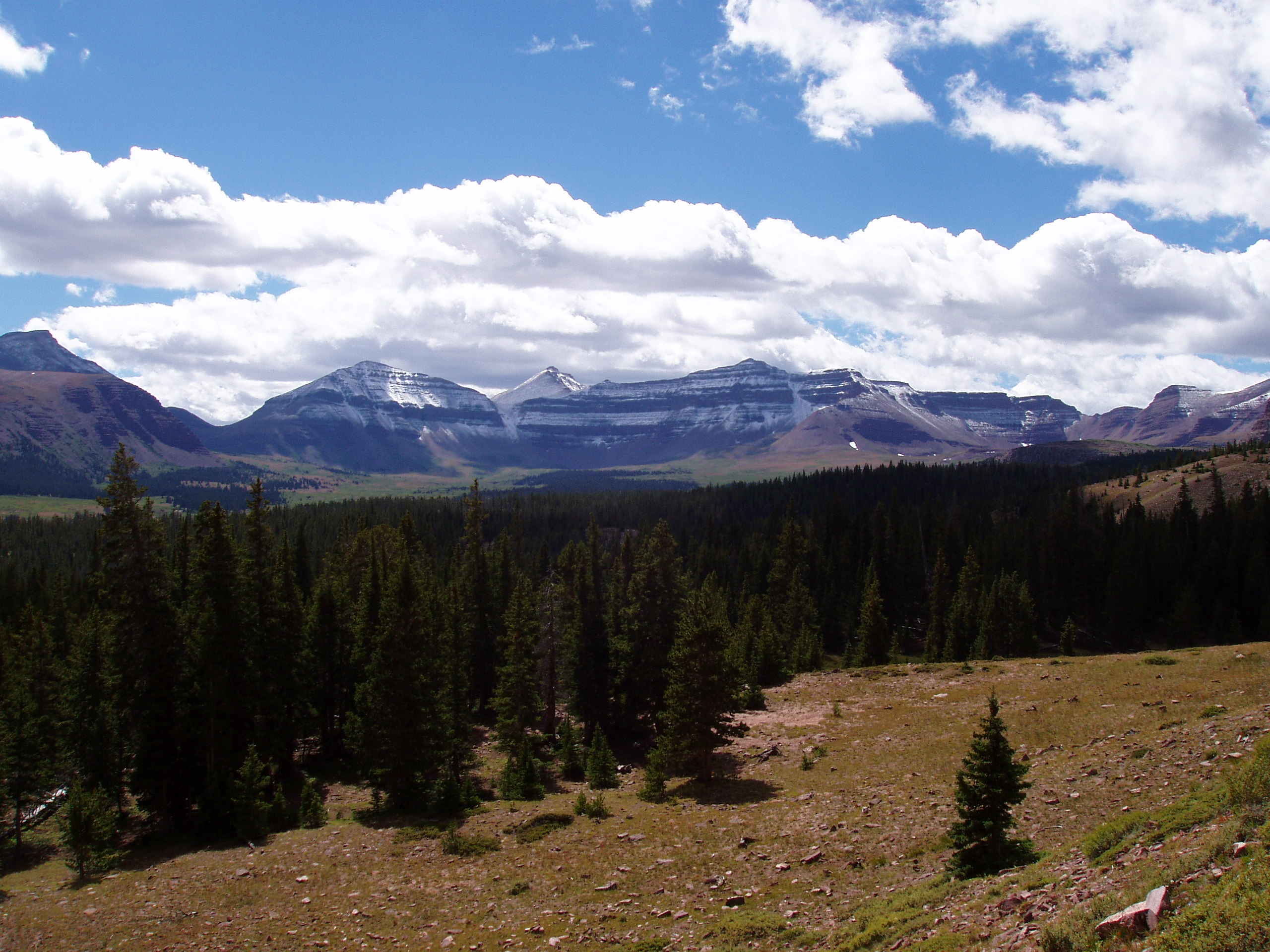
- This view of Kings Peak and the Henry's Fork Basin shows the cliff bands and basins typical throughout the Uintas.

Highest point
- Peak: Kings Peak
- Elevation: 13,528 ft (4,123 m)
- Coordinates: 40°46′34″N 110°22′22″W

Geography
- Country: United States
- States: Utah; Wyoming
- Range coordinates: 40°46′N 110°35′W
- Parent range: Rocky Mountains

Geology
- Rock age: Precambrian
- Rock types: quartzite; shale; slate

The Uinta Mountains (/juːˈɪntə/ yoo-IN-tə) are an east–west trending mountain range in northeastern Utah extending a short distance into northwest Colorado and slightly into southwestern Wyoming in the United States. As a subrange of the Rocky Mountains, they are unusual for being the highest range in the contiguous United States running east to west, and lie approximately 100 miles (160 km) east of Salt Lake City. The range has peaks ranging from 11,000 to 13,528 feet (3,353 to 4,123 m), with the highest point being Kings Peak, also the highest point in Utah. The Mirror Lake Highway crosses the western half of the Uintas on its way to Wyoming. Utah State Route 44 crosses the east end of the Uintas between Vernal and Manila.

== Etymology ==
The name "Uinta" derives from the Ute word Yoov-we-teuh, meaning "pine forest" or "pine tree".

== Geology ==
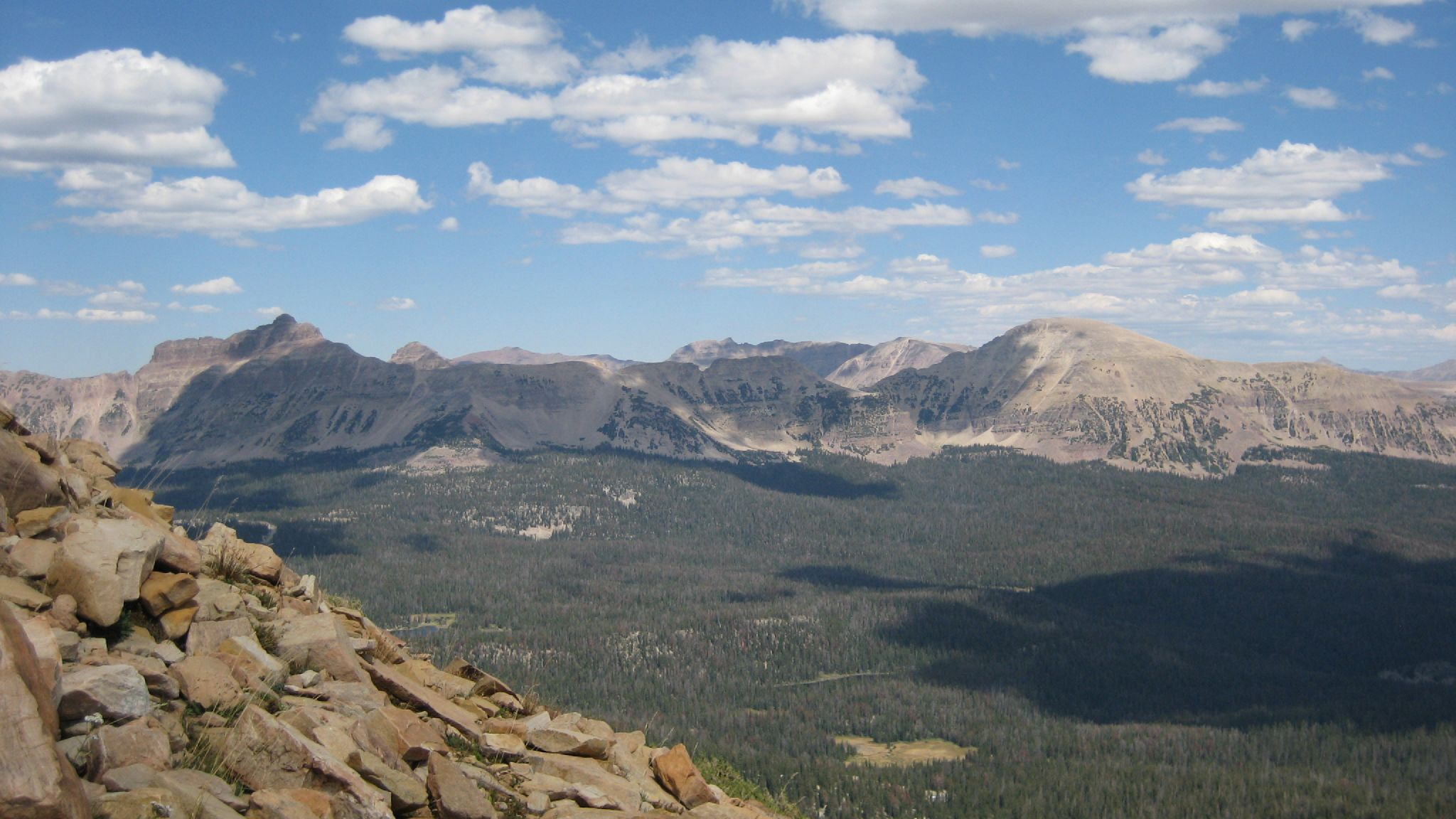
Hayden Peak and Mount Agassiz seen from Bald Mountain

The Uinta Mountains are Laramide uplifted metasedimentary rocks deposited in an intracratonic basin in southwest Laurentia during the time of the breakup of the supercontinent Rodinia. The marine and fluvial metasedimentary rocks in the core of the Uinta Mountains are of Neoproterozoic age (between about 700 million and 760 million years old) and consist primarily of quartzite, slate, and shale. These rocks comprise the Uinta Mountain Group, and reach thicknesses of 13,000 to 24,000 feet (4.0 to 7.3 km). Most of the high peaks are outcrops of the Uinta Mountain Group. Many of the peaks are ringed with bands of cliffs, rising to form broad or flat tops. The mountains are bounded to the north and south by reverse faults that meet below the range, on the north by the North Flank fault and on the south by the Uinta Basin boundary fault.

The Uinta Mountain Group, from oldest to youngest, includes Uinta Mountain undivided quartz arenite, overlain by the Moosehorn Lake, Mount Watson, Hades Peak, and Red Shale formations. The flanks of the east–west trending Uinta Mountains contain a sequence of Paleozoic and Mesozoic strata ranging from the Cambrian Lodore Formation to the Cretaceous Mancos Shale, all of which have been tilted during the uplift of the mountain range.

The uplift of the range dates to the Laramide orogeny, about 70 to 50 million years ago, when compressive forces produced high-angle reverse faults on both the north and south sides of the present mountain range. The east–west orientation of the Uintas is anomalous compared to most of the ranges of the Rocky Mountains; it may relate to changing stress patterns and rotation of the Colorado Plateau. The Green River used to flow into the Mississippi River to the Gulf of Mexico, but changed to the Colorado River by going through the Uintas. This occurred as a portion of the crust beneath the Uintas became dense enough to sink into the mantle (a "lithospheric drip"), temporarily lowering the range and removing the barrier that had blocked the river; as the range rebounded afterward, the river carved the Canyon of Lodore along its new course.

The high Uintas were extensively glaciated during the last ice age, and most of the large stream valleys on both the north and south sides of the range held long valley glaciers. However, despite reaching to over 13,500 feet (4,110 m) in elevation, the climate today is sufficiently dry that no glaciers survived even before the rapid current glacial retreat began in the middle nineteenth century. The Uintas are the most poleward mountain range in the world to reach over 13,000 feet (4,000 m) without modern glaciers, and are in fact the highest mountain range in the contiguous United States with no modern glaciers. Permafrost occurs at elevations above 10,000 feet (3,000 m) and at times forms large rock glaciers.

Soils in the Uinta Mountains are acidic to varying degrees, in contrast to the neutral or alkaline pH readings which prevail at lower elevations across most of Utah.

Between the summits and ridgelines are wide, level basins with around 500 small lakes. One of the most popular lakes is Mirror Lake because of its good fishing, scenic views, and easy road access.

== Hydrology ==
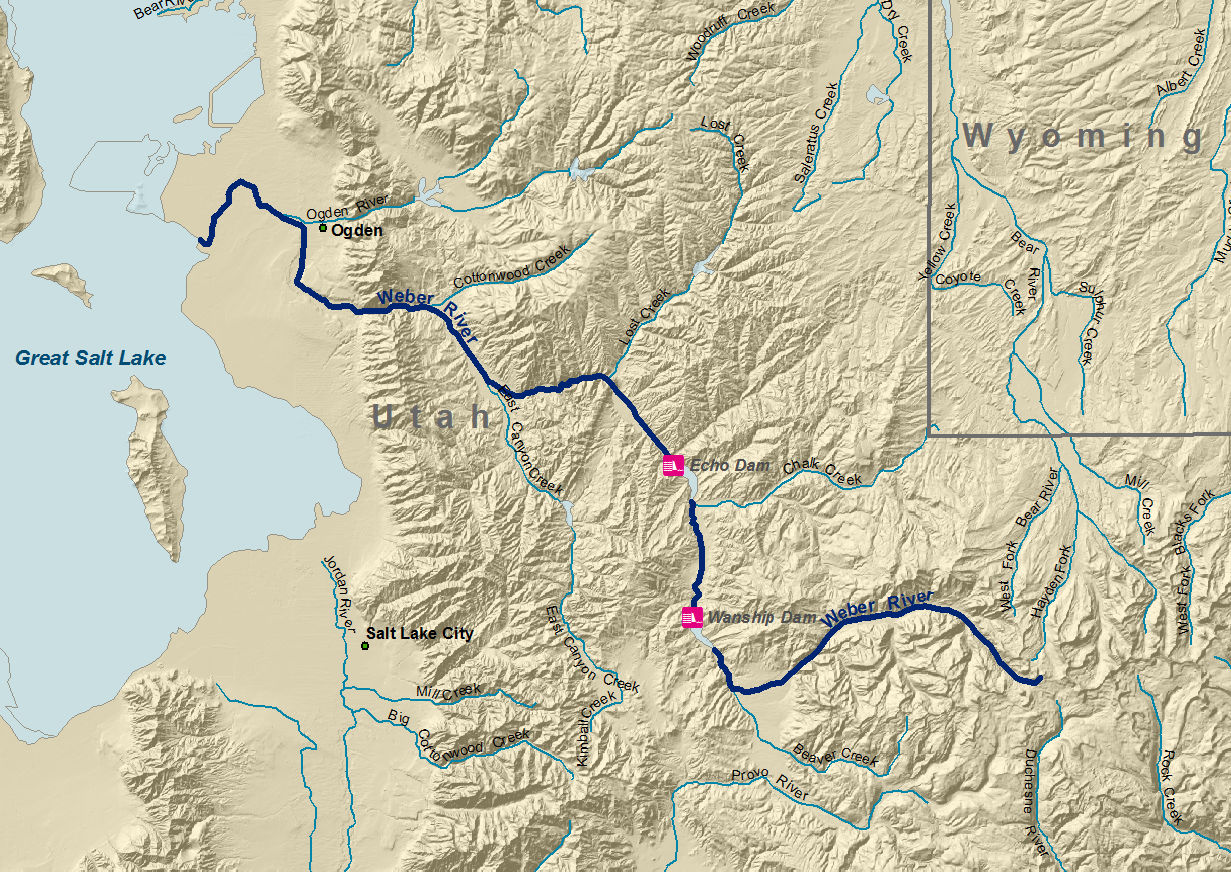
Weber River

The south and east sides of the range are largely within the Colorado River watershed, including the Blacks Fork and the Duchesne River, which are tributaries of the Green River. The Green is the major tributary of the Colorado River and flows in a tight arc around the eastern side of the range. (Indeed, John Wesley Powell said the Green was the "master stream" where it and the Colorado River came together.)

The Bear and Weber rivers, the two largest tributaries of Great Salt Lake, are born on the west slope of the range. The Provo River, the largest tributary to Utah Lake, begins on the southern side of the range and flows west to Utah Lake, which itself drains via the Jordan River into Great Salt Lake.

Large portions of the mountain range receive over 40 inches (100 cm) of precipitation annually. The high Uintas are snowcapped most of the year except for late July through early September. The Uinta Mountains have more than 400 miles (640 km) of streams and 1,000 lakes and ponds.

The Uintas have a continental snowpack leading to high avalanche danger in the winter.

== Ecology ==
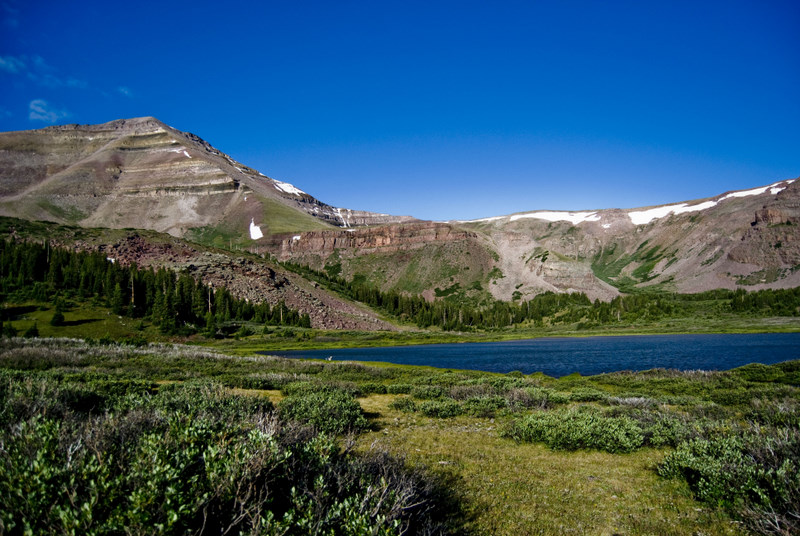
Gilbert Peak seen from lake 151

The Uinta Mountains are part of the Wasatch and Uinta montane forests ecoregion. Nearly the entire range lies within Uinta-Wasatch-Cache National Forest (on the north and west) and Ashley National Forest (on the south and east). The range's highest peaks are protected as part of the High Uintas Wilderness. The forests contain many species of trees, including lodgepole pine, subalpine fir, Engelmann spruce, Douglas-fir, and quaking aspen. There are also many species of grasses, shrubs, and forbs growing in the Uinta Mountains.

Fauna is typical of the central Rocky Mountains. Large grazing and browsing animals include elk, mule deer, moose, pronghorn, mountain goat, and Rocky Mountain bighorn sheep. Mammalian predators include the American black bear, mountain lion, coyote, red fox, American badger, wolverine, Pacific marten, and the long-tailed weasel. A gray wolf pack has been observed at the eastern end of the range, in Moffat County, Colorado. Raptors include bald and golden eagles, turkey vultures, various hawks and harriers, and owls including the great horned owl, great gray owl, and the boreal owl. Other notable birds include the greater sage-grouse and white-tailed ptarmigan.

== Points of interest ==
The Uintas are home to Camp Steiner, the highest Boy Scout camp in the U.S., at 10,400 feet (3,200 m). The camp is near mile marker 33 of the Mirror Lake Highway.

The Uinta Highline Trail traverses the entire range and is a popular backpacking trail.

Dinosaur National Monument is on the Uintas' southeast flank, on the border between Colorado and Utah.

== See also ==
- List of mountain ranges
- Mountain ranges of Utah
- High Uintas Wilderness
