= Utah State Route 150 =

State highway in Summit, Wasatch, and Duchesne Counties in Utah, United States

State Route 150
- Mirror Lake Highway
- SR 150 highlighted in red

Route information
- Maintained by UDOT
- Length: 54.742 mi (88.099 km)
- Existed: 1933–present
- Restrictions: Closed in winter from mile 14.6 to 48.6

Major junctions
- West end: SR-32 in Kamas
- North end: WYO 150 near Evanston, WY

Location
- Country: United States
- State: Utah

Highway system
- Utah State Highway System; Interstate; US; State; Minor; Scenic
← SR-149	→ SR-151

State Route 150, also known as the Mirror Lake Highway, is a state highway in the U.S. state of Utah. It is named for Mirror Lake, a picturesque lake that the highway passes along the way. It is also a USDA Forest Service Scenic Byway.

== Route description ==
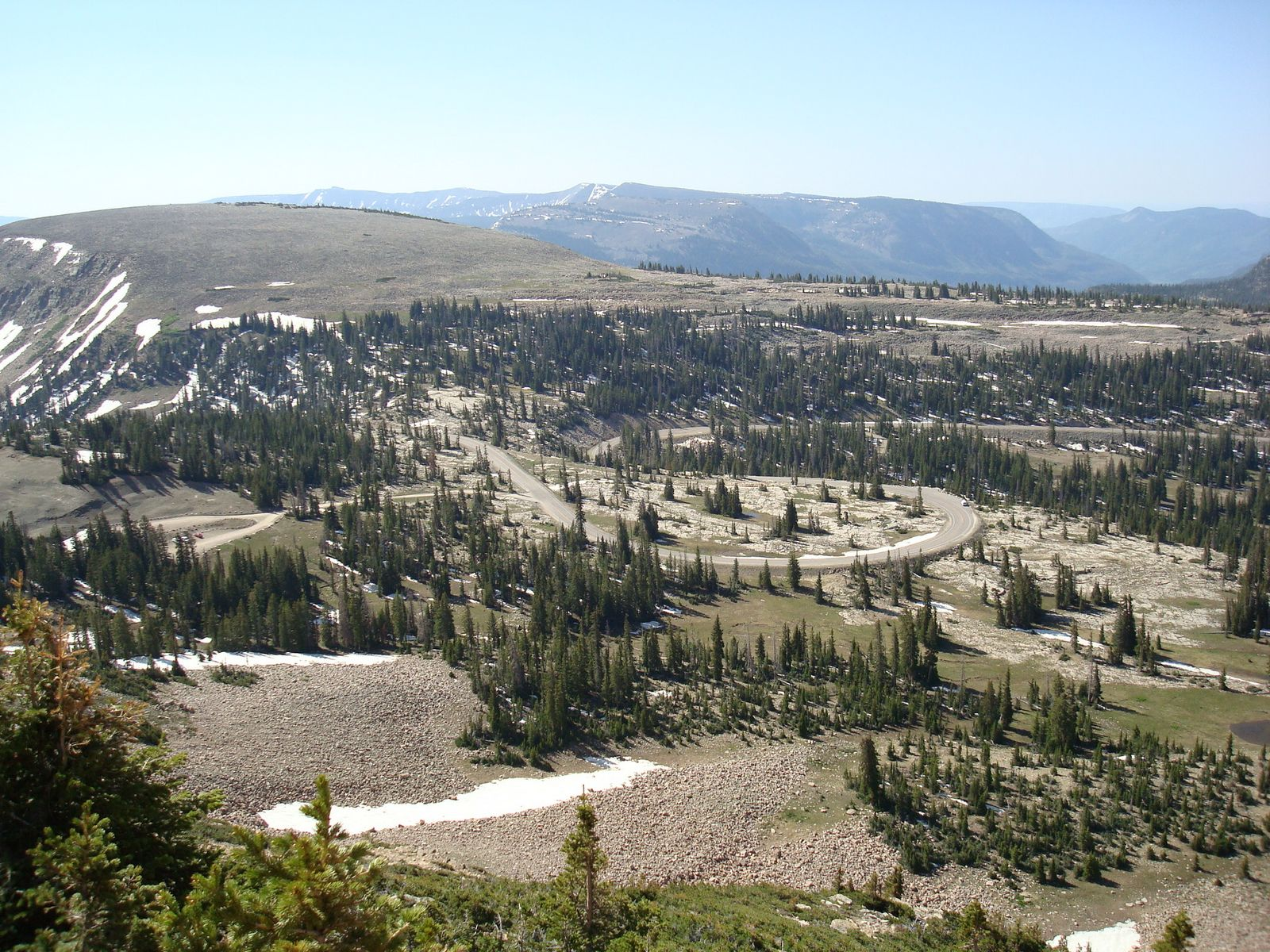
SR-150 at Bald Mountain Pass

The highway begins at the intersection of Main Street (SR-32) and Center Street in Kamas and heads east on the latter as a two-lane undivided highway. Once exiting Kamas, the route dips southeast and continues as such until reaching Samak, where the road turns northeast briefly. Soon after, the highway turns south and southeast again. After continuing in a general southeast direction, the highway turns northeast and north and continues as such until reaching the Wyoming border south of Evanston.

The road is the highest paved road in Utah when it crosses Bald Mountain Pass at an altitude of 10,715 ft (3,266 m).

During the winter months the road is closed to automobiles and is used by snowmobiles.

== History ==
The state legislature designated SR-150 in 1933, running east from SR-35 (now SR-32) in Kamas to the Wasatch-Cache National Forest boundary. In 1953, it was extended east and north via Mirror Lake to the Wyoming state line.

== Major intersections ==
County	Location	mi	km	Destinations	Notes
Summit	Kamas	0.000	0.000	SR-32 (Main Street)	Western terminus
Summit		54.742	88.099	WYO 150	Eastern terminus (Wyoming border)
1.000 mi = 1.609 km; 1.000 km = 0.621 mi
