= National Register of Historic Places listings in Dinosaur National Monument =

This is a list of the National Register of Historic Places listings in Dinosaur National Monument.

This is intended to be a complete list of the properties and districts on the National Register of Historic Places in Dinosaur National Monument, Utah and Colorado, United States. The locations of National Register properties and districts for which the latitude and longitude coordinates are included below, may be seen in a map.

There are eight properties and districts listed on the National Register in the park, one of which is a National Historic Landmark. Most of the park is in Moffat County, Colorado, but it extends also into Uintah County, Utah; the Quarry Visitor Center is in that portion.

This National Park Service list is complete through NPS recent listings posted June 20, 2025.

== Current listings ==
	Name on the Register	Image	Date listed	Location	City or town	Description
1	Castle Park Archeological District	Castle Park Archeological District	January 3, 2006 (#06000055)	Castle Park	Dinosaur, Colorado, vicinity	Sites of a Formative stage community, with wide-ranging archaeological potential.
2	Rial Chew Ranch Complex	Rial Chew Ranch Complex	October 27, 1987 (#86003392)	Echo Park Rd. 40°29′59″N 109°00′30″W	Dinosaur, Colorado, vicinity	The monument's most complete example of a family-owned ranch, established in 1902 and comprising 12 contributing properties, including a 1940 ranch house with superlative log architecture.
3	Earl Douglass Workshop-Laboratory	Earl Douglass Workshop-Laboratory	December 19, 1986 (#86003400)	Quarry Entrance Rd. 40°26′27″N 109°18′07″W	Jensen, Utah, vicinity	Circa-1915 field laboratory of Earl Douglass (1862–1931), the paleontologist who discovered and led excavations at the adjacent dinosaur fossil bed.
4	Denis Julien Inscription		December 19, 1986 (#86003395)	Whirlpool Canyon; 40°32′43″N 109°00′27″W	Dinosaur, Colorado, vicinity	1838 carving by early trapper Denis Julien; the only tangible remnant of the fur trade era within Dinosaur National Monument.
5	Mantle's Cave		May 10, 1994 (#94000394)	Castle Park; 40°27′59″N 108°54′07″W	Dinosaur, Colorado, vicinity	Large rock shelter with numerous Fremont storage features, yielding rarely preserved organic artifacts that were instrumental in establishing an archaeological knowledge of Fremont material culture.
6	Josie Bassett Morris Ranch Complex	Josie Bassett Morris Ranch Complex	December 19, 1986 (#86003394)	Cub Creek Rd. 40°25′31″N 109°10′30″W	Jensen, Utah, vicinity	Ranch complex with eight contributing properties built 1914–1925 by Josie Bassett Morris (1874–1964), an independent female homesteader and colorful local character once associated with the outlaws of Browns Park.
7	Quarry Visitor Center	Quarry Visitor Center	December 19, 1986 (#86003401)	Quarry Entrance Rd. 40°26′26″N 109°18′04″W	Jensen, Utah, vicinity	Unique visitor center built over a fossil bed 1957–1958; a preeminent example of the Mission 66 initiative and one that helped legitimize modern architecture in the National Park system. Redubbed Quarry Exhibit Hall.
8	Upper Wade and Curtis Cabin	Upper Wade and Curtis Cabin	December 19, 1986 (#86003399)	Gates of Lodore Campground; 40°43′39″N 108°53′16″W	Sunbeam, Colorado, vicinity	Cabin moved onsite in 1933 as part of an early tourist camp that helped spark interest in adding the Green and Yampa canyons to Dinosaur National Monument. Now staff housing.

== See also ==
- National Register of Historic Places listings in Moffat County, Colorado
- National Register of Historic Places listings in Uintah County, Utah
- List of National Historic Landmarks in Utah
- National Register of Historic Places listings in Colorado
- National Register of Historic Places listings in Utah
