= National Register of Historic Places listings in Moffat County, Colorado =

Location of Moffat County in Colorado

This is a list of the National Register of Historic Places listings in Moffat County, Colorado.

This is intended to be a complete list of the properties and districts on the National Register of Historic Places in Moffat County, Colorado, United States. The locations of National Register properties and districts for which the latitude and longitude coordinates are included below, may be seen in a map.

There are 15 properties and districts listed on the National Register in the county.

This National Park Service list is complete through NPS recent listings posted August 28, 2026.

== Current listings ==
	Name on the Register	Image	Date listed	Location	City or town	Description
1	Bromide Charcoal Kilns	Bromide Charcoal Kilns	June 30, 2000 (#00000740)	County Road 84; 40°34′39″N 108°39′25″W	Greystone vicinity	Four well-preserved charcoal kilns built in 1898; the only intact vestiges of a smelting facility established to serve a remote copper mining district primarily active late-1890s–1917.
2	Castle Park Archeological District	Castle Park Archeological District	January 3, 2006 (#06000055)	Castle Park	Dinosaur National Monument	Sites of a Formative stage community, with wide-ranging archaeological potential.
3	Rial Chew Ranch Complex	Rial Chew Ranch Complex	October 27, 1987 (#86003392)	Echo Park Rd. 40°29′59″N 109°00′30″W	Dinosaur National Monument	Dinosaur National Monument's most complete example of a family-owned ranch, established in 1902 and comprising 12 contributing properties, including a 1940 ranch house with superlative log architecture.
4	Craig School #2	Craig School #2	April 4, 2023 (#100008788)	775 Yampa Ave. 40°31′09″N 107°32′48″W	Craig	1920 Neoclassical school expanded in 1939 as a Public Works Administration project, providing an education to multiple generations of local youth.
5	First National Bank Building	First National Bank Building	July 17, 1997 (#97000793)	502–506 Yampa Ave. 40°30′52″N 107°32′51″W	Craig	Craig's only example of a common early-20th-century commercial building type with ground-floor retail and second-floor office/meeting space; built in 1917 and tenanted according to the ebb and flow of the local economy.
6	Denis Julien Inscription		December 19, 1986 (#86003395)	Whirlpool Canyon; 40°32′43″N 109°00′27″W	Dinosaur National Monument	1838 carving by early trapper Denis Julien; the only tangible remnant of the fur trade era within Dinosaur National Monument.
7	Lay School	Lay School	March 20, 2013 (#13000080)	7 Eddy Ave. 40°31′39″N 107°52′55″W	Lay	Well-preserved one-room school active 1910–1959, with its original flagpole and swing set. Also noted for its service as an all-purpose community venue and for its historical archaeology potential.
8	Mantle's Cave		May 10, 1994 (#94000394)	Castle Park; 40°27′59″N 108°54′07″W	Dinosaur National Monument	Large rock shelter with numerous Fremont storage features, yielding rarely preserved organic artifacts that were instrumental in establishing an archaeological knowledge of Fremont material culture.
9	Marcia (Pullman car)	Marcia (Pullman car)	June 20, 1975 (#75000526)	341 E. Victory Way; 40°30′52″N 107°32′33″W	Craig	Personal Pullman car built in 1906 for financier and railroad magnate David Moffat (1839–1911), a pivotal figure in establishing Colorado's gold mining industry and rail connections to national markets.
10	Old Ladore School	Old Ladore School	February 24, 1975 (#75000525)	County Rd. 114; 40°46′48″N 108°53′34″W	Browns Park National Wildlife Refuge	1911 school also used extensively for community events, becoming the social center for ranching families dispersed across the isolated corner of Colorado, Utah, and Wyoming.
11	State Armory	State Armory	June 25, 1992 (#92000810)	590 Yampa Ave. 40°30′57″N 107°32′51″W	Craig	1922 Mediterranean Revival armory designed by John J. Huddart, providing Craig with both a National Guard unit and an event venue. Became the Museum of Northwest Colorado in 1990.
12	Two-Bar Ranch	Two-Bar Ranch	February 17, 1978 (#78000873)	Off State Highway 318; 40°47′10″N 108°53′40″W	Browns Park National Wildlife Refuge	Ruined headquarters complex of what was once one of the largest cattle ranches in Colorado and Wyoming, established in 1887.
13	Upper Wade and Curtis Cabin	Upper Wade and Curtis Cabin	December 19, 1986 (#86003399)	Gates of Lodore Campground; 40°43′39″N 108°53′16″W	Dinosaur National Monument	Cabin moved onsite in 1933 as part of an early tourist camp that helped spark interest in adding the Green and Yampa canyons to Dinosaur National Monument. Now staff housing.
14	Vanatta Apartments	Vanatta Apartments	January 11, 1996 (#95001511)	660 Yampa Ave. 40°31′02″N 107°32′51″W	Craig	The first apartment building in Craig, constructed in 1924 to accommodate a population boom following oil discoveries. Listing includes a detached garage.
15	White-Indian Contact Site		March 8, 1977 (#77001561)	Address restricted	Browns Park National Wildlife Refuge	Site of contact between fur traders and Native Americans—possibly the location of an 1830s trading post called Fort Davy Crockett—in a valley popular for rendezvous and winter encampments into the 1840s.

== See also ==
- List of National Historic Landmarks in Colorado
- List of National Register of Historic Places in Colorado
- National Register of Historic Places listings in Dinosaur National Monument
