= Denis Julien Inscription =

Denis Julien Inscription may refer to one of four incised panels on rocks in southeastern Utah or northwestern Colorado in the United States, that were created by trapper Denis Julien in the 1830s and 1840s (each of which is listed on the National Register of Historic Places):

- Denis Julien Inscription (Moffat County, Colorado), Dinosaur National Monument (also known as the "Julien, Denis, Inscription")
- Denis Julien Inscription (Grand County, Utah), Canyonlands National Park
- Denis Julien Inscription (San Juan County, Utah), Glen Canyon National Recreation Area (also knowns as the "Julien Inscription")
- Julien Inscription Panel, Arches National Park
