= Earl Douglass Workshop–Laboratory =

- U.S. National Register of Historic Places
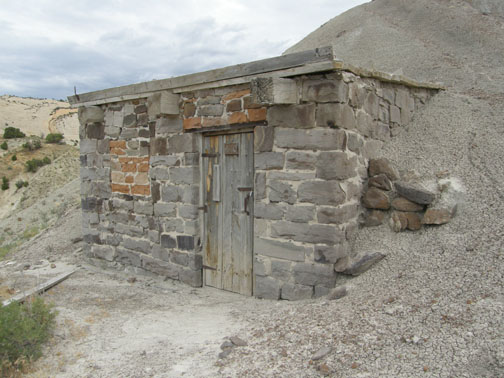

- Location within Utah Location within the United States
- Location: Quarry Entrance Road, Dinosaur National Monument, Utah
- Coordinates: 40°26′26″N 109°18′4″W
- Area: less than one acre
- Built by: Carnegie Museum of Natural History
- MPS: Dinosaur National Monument MRA
- NRHP reference No.: 86003400
- Added to NRHP: December 19, 1986

The Earl Douglass Workshop–Laboratory was used by Earl Douglass, the discoverer of the dinosaur bone deposits at the dinosaur quarry in Dinosaur National Monument, to preserve, study and prepare fossil specimens. Located next to the quarry adjacent to the Quarry Visitor Center, the workshop is a 10.5-foot (3.2 m) by 13.17-foot (4.01 m) stone shed with a flat soil roof, built into the hillside. It was built about 1920 by Carnegie Museum of Natural History personnel who were working at the site in eastern Utah.

The workshop was placed on the National Register of Historic Places on December 16, 1986.
