= Denis Julien Inscription (Grand County, Utah) =

- U.S. National Register of Historic Places
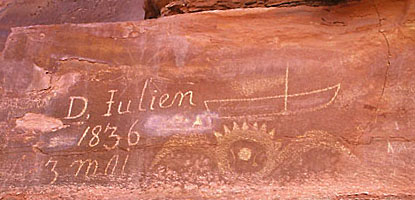
- National Park Service photograph, July 2006

- Location within Utah Location within the United States
- Location: Hellroaring Canyon in southwestern Grand County, Utah; United States
- Nearest city: Moab
- Coordinates: 38°33′49″N 109°59′2″W
- Area: less than one acre
- Built: 1836
- NRHP reference No.: 91000617
- Added to NRHP: May 23, 1991

The Denis Julien Inscription is an incised carving on a rock face in a side canyon of the Green River north of Canyonlands National Park in southwestern Grand County, Utah, United States. The site is about 750 feet (230 m) to the east of the Green River in Hell Roaring Canyon, at the top of a talus slope. The inscription was left by trapper Denis Julien in 1836, when he was one of the few Europeans in southern Utah. The panel reads:

D. Julien

1836

3 mai

A boat with a mast is depicted to the right of the lettering, with a bird-like object below. Later travelers have left their own markings nearby. The Julien is one of at least eight that he left in Utah between 1831 and 1844. The inscription is significant in depicting an apparent sailboat, supporting the theory that he sailed upstream against the current as the date progression of his inscriptions would imply. Nearby inscriptions left by Bureau of Reclamation employees in 1914 on a damsite survey expedition are also considered significant.

== See also ==
- National Register of Historic Places listings in Grand County, Utah
- Julien Inscription Panel, a similar inscription in Arches National Park dated June 9, 1844
- Denis Julien Inscription (San Juan County, Utah), a similar inscription in Canyonlands National Park on the Colorado River that may not have been left by Julien, dated May 1836
- Denis Julien Inscription (Moffat County, Colorado) in Dinosaur National Monument
