= Julien Inscription Panel =

- U.S. National Register of Historic Places
- Location within Utah Location within the United States
- Nearest city: Moab, Utah
- Coordinates: 38°49′23″N 109°39′0″W
- Area: less than one acre
- Built: 1844
- Architect: Julien, Denis
- MPS: Arches National Park MRA
- NRHP reference No.: 88001184
- Added to NRHP: October 06, 1988

The Julien Inscription Panel is a rock face in Arches National Park that has been marked by passers-by who have incised their names into the desert varnish on the sandstone rock of the vertical rock face. Most of the signatures have been added since 1900. The most significant inscription was left by Denis Julien, a French-American trapper who traveled throughout the American southwest, leaving his mark as he went. The Julien inscription dates to June 9, 1844. The site also includes some prehistoric petroglyphs.

The Julien Inscription Panel was placed on the National Register of Historic Places on October 7, 1988.

== See also ==
- Denis Julien Inscription (San Juan County, Utah), a similar inscription in Canyonlands National Park on the Colorado River that may not have been left by Julien
- Denis Julien Inscription (Grand County, Utah), more firmly attributed to Julien
- Denis Julien Inscription (Moffat County, Colorado) in Dinosaur National Monument
