= Denis Julien Inscription (San Juan County, Utah) =

- Julien Inscription
- U.S. National Register of Historic Places
- Location within Utah Location within the United States
- Nearest city: Moab, Utah
- Coordinates: 38°9′16″N 109°55′32″W
- Area: less than one acre
- Artist: Denis Julien
- MPS: Canyonlands National Park MRA
- NRHP reference No.: 88001248
- Added to NRHP: October 7, 1988

The Denis Julien Inscription is a rock-carved graffito purportedly left by French- American trapper Denis Julien in southern Utah when he was traveling in the area in the late 1830s or early 1840s, one of the first Europeans to enter the area. The inscription is within the boundaries of Canyonlands National Park, on the bank of the Colorado River. The inscription reads:

Denis Julian

MAIZ

1836'

The misspelling of "Julien" has led to doubts about its authenticity. One interpretation is that the apparent "a" is a script "e." The inscription was listed on the National Register of Historic Places on October 7, 1988.

The inscription is one of at least eight that Julien left in Utah between 1831 and 1844.

== See also ==
- Julien Inscription Panel, a similar inscription in Arches National Park more firmly attributed to Julien.
- Denis Julien Inscription (Grand County, Utah), more firmly attributed to Julien
- Denis Julien Inscription (Moffat County, Colorado) in Dinosaur National Monument
