= Vanatta Apartments =

- U.S. National Register of Historic Places
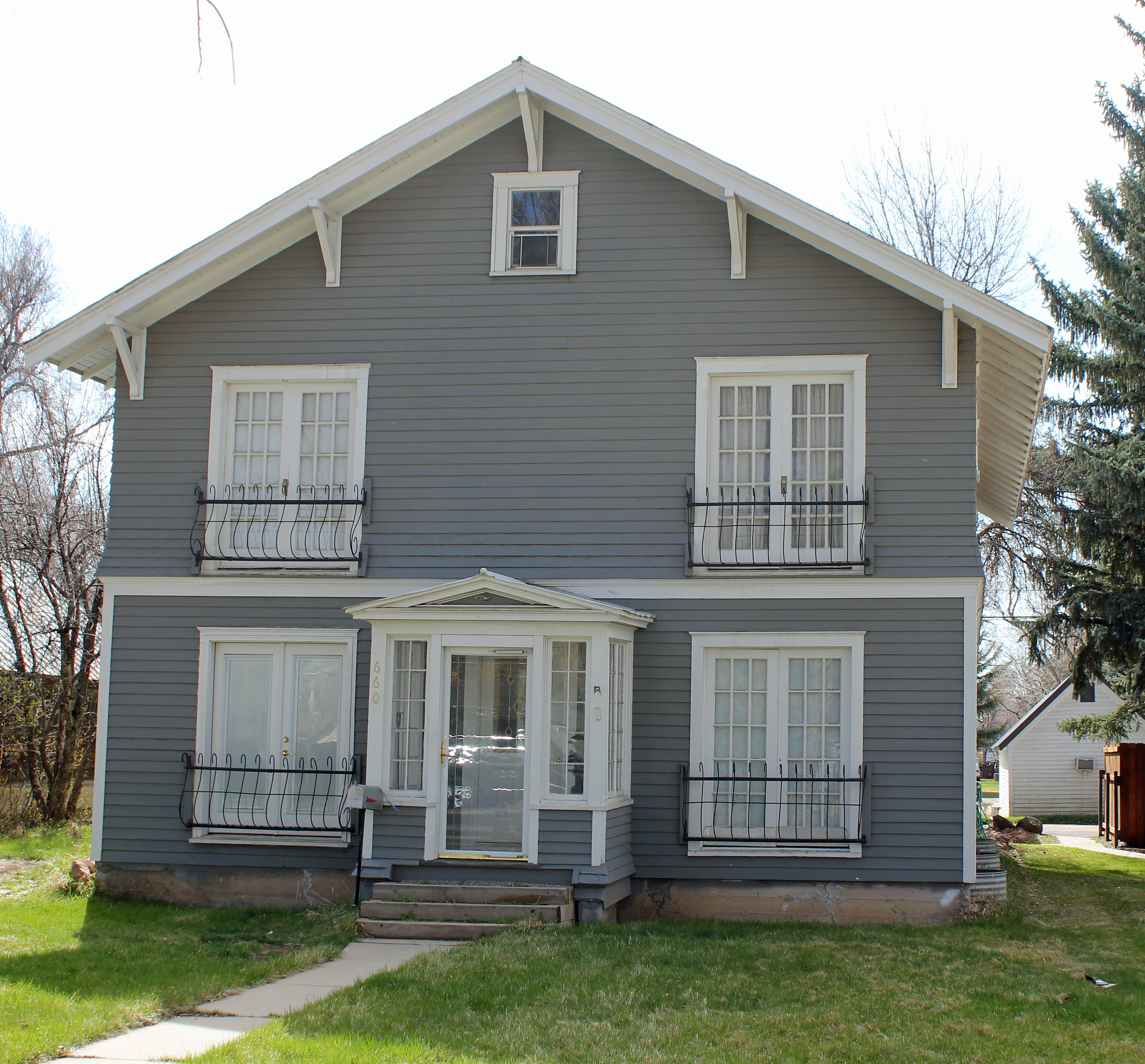

- Location within Colorado
- Location: 660 Yampa Ave., Craig, Colorado
- Coordinates: 40°31′02″N 107°32′49″W
- Area: less than one acre
- Architectural style: Late 19th and Early 20th Century American Movements
- NRHP reference No.: 95001511
- Added to NRHP: January 11, 1996

The Vanatta Apartments, at 660 Yampa Ave. in Craig, Colorado, were listed on the National Register of Historic Places in 1996.

It is a 44 by 30 feet (13.4 m × 9.1 m) apartment building built in 1924 on a full poured concrete basement, and is clad with wood lap siding.

It was deemed notable for its "association with the pattern of community planning and development which occurred in 1924 when the Craig area experienced a spurt of economic and population growth resulting from the local discovery of oil. The Vanatta Apartments were the first modern apartments to be built in town as a response to the rapid influx of new oil-related residents and their need for affordable housing."

Oil was found in the Hamilton dome by the Texas Company (later Texaco) and then more oil deposits were found south of Craig, and 11 oil-related companies were busy in Craig in 1925.

The building was built for Edward G. Vanatta, a one-handed lawyer who relocated to Craig from Casper, Wyoming in 1924, and built the apartment house to live in, himself, and to supplement his income as a lawyer. He lived there until his death in 1952. He served as Craig's city attorney and, for a number of years, as president of the Craig Chamber of Commerce.

A 20 by 14 feet (6.1 m × 4.3 m) rectangular garage, contemporary to the apartment building, is considered a second contributing building in the listing.
