= Josie Bassett Morris Ranch Complex =

- Morris, Josie Bassett, Ranch Complex
- U.S. National Register of Historic Places
- U.S. Historic district
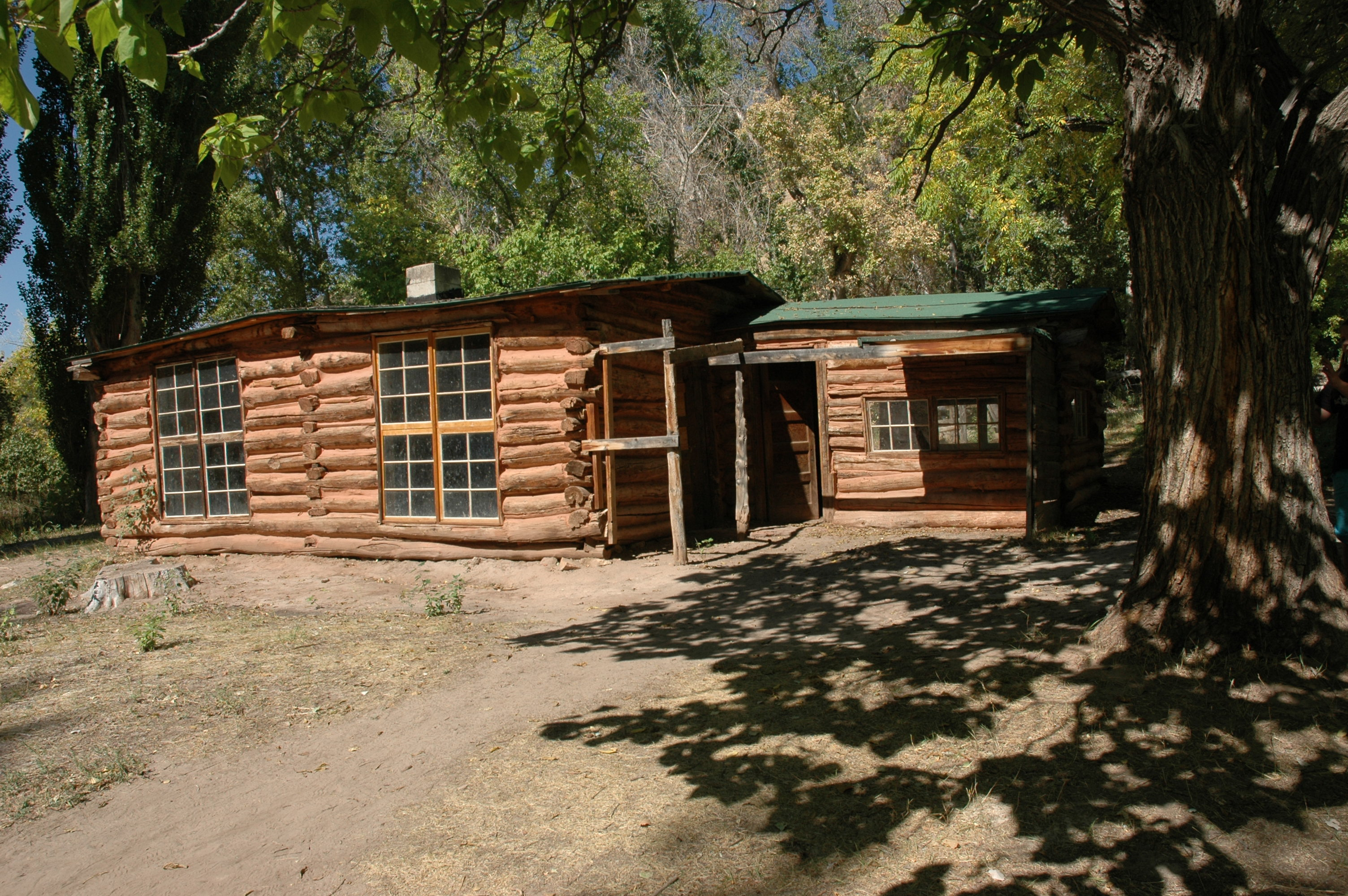
- Josie Morris Cabin, October 2010

- Location within Utah Location within the United States
- Location: Dinosaur National Monument; Uintah County, Utah; United States
- Coordinates: 40°25′31″N 109°10′29″W
- Area: 80 acres (32 ha)
- Built by: Morris, Josie Bassett
- MPS: Dinosaur National Monument MRA
- NRHP reference No.: 86003394
- Added to NRHP: December 19, 1986

The Josie Bassett Morris Ranch Complex comprises a small complex of buildings in what is now Dinosaur National Monument in northeastern Uintah County, Utah, United States. The complex is listed as a historic district on the National Register of Historic Places. It is where Josie Bassett Morris, a small-time rancher and occasional accused stock thief, lived until 1963. The ranch, located in Browns Park, Colorado, was established by the Bassett family in the 1870s. Josie grew up there, and through her family came to know a number of outlaws, including Butch Cassidy, who frequented the area. Morris established her own homestead on Cub Creek in Utah in 1914 with help from friends Fred McKnight and the Chew family.

== Josie Bassett Morris ==
The Bassett family moved west from Arkansas around 1877 to establish a homestead in the west, taking their three-year-old daughter Josie. Comparatively wealthy and educated for homesteaders, they established a ranch in the Brown's Park region near the Colorado-Wyoming border. Josie married Jim McKnight at the age of 19 in 1893. In 1914 Josie and husband M.B. (Ben) Morris, without much money, established a homestead claim at Cub Creek near Split Mountain, 40 miles from the family ranch. Her son Crawford and his wife lived there for a time, and grandchildren visited.

Morris was a colorful local character, married five times and divorcing four of her husbands, and living in the cabin for over fifty years until she fell on ice and broke her hip in 1963. She died the following year at the age of 90. She was tried and acquitted for cattle rustling in her 60s and made brandy and wine from local fruit and berries during Prohibition.

== Ranch ==
The ranch house started as a low square log cabin, with a kitchen added later. The house is surrounded by dependent structures, such as a chicken house, outhouse, root cellar, sheds and a small barn. A bridge provided access to the root cellar, located across the creek.

The Morris ranch complex was placed on the National Register of Historic Places on December 19, 1986. The National Park Service maintains an interpretive display at the site.

== See also ==
- List of National Historic Landmarks in Utah
- National Register of Historic Places listings in Uintah County, Utah
