= Rial Chew Ranch Complex =

- U.S. National Register of Historic Places
- U.S. Historic district
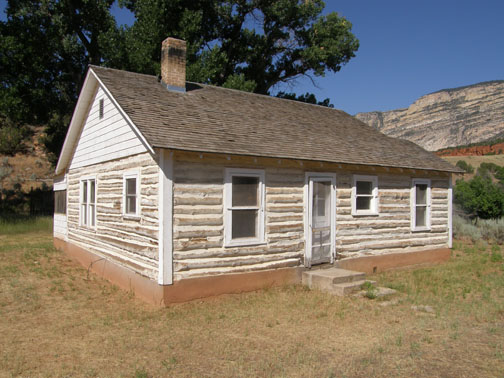
- Chew Ranch House

- Location within Colorado Location within the United States
- Location: US 40, Dinosaur, Colorado
- Coordinates: 40°29′55″N 109°0′47″W
- Architect: Rial Chew
- MPS: Dinosaur National Monument MRA
- NRHP reference No.: 86003392
- Added to NRHP: October 27, 1987

The Rial Chew Ranch Historic District comprises a ranching operation in what is now Dinosaur National Monument in northwestern Colorado, that existed from 1900 to 1949. The Rial Chew family established the ranch in 1900, operating it as a park inholding after the national monument was established in 1919. The district includes a house, a cabin, root cellar, corrals and several storage buildings. The cabin may have been built at Blue Mountain by Harry Chew, and moved to the present site by Jack Chew, Rial's father. The ranch was occupied by the Chew family until their special use permit expired in the early 1970s.
