= Denis Julien =

Denis Julien (born c. 1772) was an American fur trapper of French-Canadian Huguenot origin best known for his activity in the southwestern United States in the 1830s and 1840s, at a time when he was one of the few people of European descent in the area. He is principally remembered for his habit of leaving carved inscriptions on rock faces in Utah and Colorado during his travels. At least eight such markings have been positively attributed to him, four of which are listed on the National Register of Historic Places.

== Early life ==
Julien's exact date and place of birth are unknown. He apparently lived in Saint Louis in the 1790s. The first written documents mentioning him are baptismal records from the Saint Louis Cathedral for three children born to Julien and his Native American wife Catherine in 1793, 1798, and 1801. Three children were christened and one was buried between 1798 and 1809. Julien soon began a working relationship with Saint Louis fur baron Jean-Pierre Chouteau, a connection which would provide him with employment as a trader and trapper throughout the Midwest; his name appears in Chouteau's ledgers as early as 1803. From 1805 to 1819 he owned land near Fort Madison in present-day Iowa, and in 1821 in the village of Prairie du Chien in what is now Wisconsin.

Julien was mentioned in an 1808 letter by then-Governor of the Louisiana Territory Meriwether Lewis to Secretary of War Henry Dearborn as an "old and rispected [sic] trader among the Ioways." Julien and his brother were in the military in northern Louisiana in 1809. Denis witnessed the 1815 Iowa Treaty and received licenses to trade on the upper Missouri River in 1816 and 1817. During this time he remained connected to the Chouteau and Robidoux families of Saint Louis. An entry dated December 26, 1825 in James Kennerly's journal at Fort Atkinson suggests that Julien shot and wounded another man. Kennerly was the fort's civilian sutler. Records of Julien in the Midwest cease after this point.

In 1827, Julien made his first trip to the far west as a member of a party led by François Robidoux to recover cached furs. They passed through Taos, New Mexico and eventually reached "the land of the Utes" in what is now southern Utah and western Colorado. Nauhnan, son of Chief Tabby, told of a trading post established by "white man the Indians called 'Sambo' and the other one called 'Julie'", with these names thought to reference Denis Julien ("Julie") and Augustus Archambeaux ("Sambo"). According to Nauhnan, in 1828, Julien, Archambeaux, William "Toopchee" Reed, and Reed's 14-year-old son (or nephew) Jim Reed established the Reed trading post near a spring just south and east of the present-day settlement of Whiterocks, Utah in Uintah County. They brought the first butcher knives, coffee beans, and other articles to the area and traded them to the local Indians for furs. The trading post was short-lived and was sold to Antoine Robidoux in 1832, who built his own fort immediately east across the spring.

== Rock inscriptions ==
Julien stayed on at Fort Robidoux until 1836, and the series of rock inscriptions he made during and after this time are the only record of his movements in the latter part of his life. The earliest known Julien inscription is located on the Uinta River about ten miles downstream of the former site of the Reed trading post, where he scratched his name and the date, "Denis Julien 1831", on a sandstone ledge. In doing so he became one of the first Europeans to leave a dateable mark in what is now Utah; only a 1776 inscription left by members of the Domínguez–Escalante expedition in Glen Canyon and an 1825 inscription left by William Henry Ashley along the Colorado River predate him.

Julien left dated marks in 1831, 1832, 1836, 1838, and 1844, apparently traveling up and down the Colorado and Green rivers in a boat assisted by a sail, since one of his inscriptions depicts a boat with a mast. Of the eight markings generally accepted as authentic Julien inscriptions, seven are in present-day Utah and one just across the state line in Colorado; two of these eight have evidently been lost in modern times, though they are considered reliably reported. An additional two inscriptions, both in Utah, are also sometimes mentioned alongside the others, though their authenticity is disputed by historians. Several of the Julien inscriptions were not rediscovered, or at least not brought to the attention of the general public, for more than a century after he made them.

All of the genuine Julien graffiti consist of his full name or initials and the date, with French spellings. His carvings are typically found on flat surfaces of large boulders or canyon walls along perennial waterways and very close to the water level, and are distinguished by deep, bold incisions into the rock and frequent use of old-style French block letters (for example, a capital "J" that looks more like a modern capital "I" or "E"). They are often adjacent to much older prehistoric petroglyphs, as well as later inscriptions from cowboys, prospectors, and tourists.

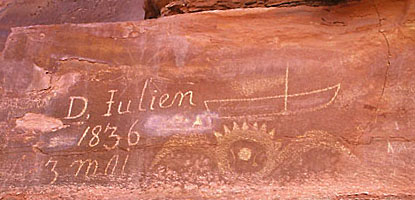
National Park Service photograph of the Hell Roaring Canyon inscription, July 2006

Four of Julien's inscriptions are listed on the U.S. National Register of Historic Places:

- Hell Roaring Canyon inscription. Dated May 3, 1836. On a square rock face above the Green River near the mouth of Hell Roaring Canyon in southwestern Grand County, Utah. Some sources indicate that this inscription is located within Canyonlands National Park, but it is actually about 5 miles [8.0 km] north of the park's northern boundary.
- Lower Red Lake Canyon inscription. Dated 1836. Near the top of a talus slope on the east bank of the Colorado River, just below the mouth of Lower Red Lake Canyon, Canyonlands National Park, San Juan County, Utah. Authenticity disputed.
- Whirlpool Canyon inscription. Dated 1838. In a small alcove on the Green River a few miles downstream of Echo Park, Dinosaur National Monument, Moffat County, Colorado.
- Julien Inscription Panel. Dated June 9, 1844. At the base of a large sandstone fin at least 15 miles inland from the nearest river, in the Devils Garden area of Arches National Park, Grand County, Utah. Authenticity disputed.

A Denis Julien inscription from 1836 was rediscovered in lower Cataract Canyon by Otis R. Marston in 1964, but is now buried under the reservoir behind Glen Canyon Dam. There is also an undated "DJ" inscription at the mouth of Chandler Creek in Desolation Canyon on the Upper Green River. It is located on a large boulder to the left of the road as the road comes out on to the bottom of the canyon.

== See also ==
- North American fur trade
