= Mantle's Cave =

Archaeological site in Colorado, United States

- U.S. National Register of Historic Places
- Location within Colorado Location within the United States
- Nearest city: Dinosaur, Colorado
- Coordinates: 40°28′0″N 108°54′4″W
- Area: less than one acre
- NRHP reference No.: 94000394
- Added to NRHP: May 10, 1994

Mantle's Cave is a cliff alcove in Dinosaur National Monument in Moffat County, Colorado. Located in the Castle Park region of the park, it is the largest rock shelter in the area. It was discovered before 1921 by local ranchers, Mr. and Mrs. Charles Mantle. Mrs. Mantle is reported to have done some excavation of the site, followed up by the Penrose-Taylor expedition of 1933 from Colorado College and the Fountain Valley School, which designated the site "Cave One." The site is a significant resource for the Fremont culture and is among the best resources in northwestern Colorado. Excavations in the 1930s and 1940s yielded significant material on the Fremont people and their relationship to the later Ancestral Puebloans.

== Investigation ==
The cave was found to have dwelling sites and granaries, with pottery shards, baskets and hunting tools recovered. An extensive excavation was undertaken by the University of Colorado Museum in 1939 and 1940, led by Charles R. Scoggin, a student assistant at the museum, and Edison P. Lohr. The survey found the most significant artifacts in small holes that were probably meant to be temporary caches, including stone and bone projectile points, stone tools, bones, beads, robe seeds, fragments of clothing and footwear and other objects. The most significant discovery was a bag containing a feathered headdress, beads and other objects. Investigations were interrupted by World War II. Scoggin was killed in action at the Anzio beachhead, Italy in 1944. Limited work resumed in 1947 and 1948 under Robert Burgh, finding little additional material. No human remains were found by either party.

The investigators concluded that the site was used primarily for storage. Little sign of long-term habitation was found, attributed to the cave's northern exposure and elevation of 5,365 feet (1,635 m), which would have made it an uncomfortable dwelling. Artifacts are primary associated with the Fremont culture. Excavations suggested that there was an earlier period of use, based on the finding of charcoal at depth. Excavations have not been pursued in this layer. In all, 53 built or excavated features have been identified. Several prehistoric petroglyphs and some modern graffiti exist in the alcove. Findings of the two expeditions were published by Burgh (with posthumous authorship by Scoggin) in 1948 as The Archeology of Castle Park, Dinosaur National Monument.

== Description ==
The alcove faces north. It is wider than it is deep, about 100 metres (330 ft) wide and about 40 metres (130 ft) deep, with an area of about 3,140 square metres (33,800 sq ft). It is sited about 450 metres (1,480 ft) south of the Yampa River, about 100 metres (330 ft) higher than the river. Located in Permian and Pennsylvanian Weber sandstone, the alcove stands just below the rim of a bench in the valley walls.

The artifacts collected from Mantle's Cave are conserved at the University of Colorado Museum of Natural History. The cave was listed on the National Register of Historic Places on May 10, 1994.
