= Jensen, Utah =

- CDP
- Jensen Fire Station

- Location in Uintah County and the state of Utah
- Coordinates: 40°22′02″N 109°21′26″W
- Country: United States
- State: Utah
- County: Uintah
- Settled: 1877
- Named for: Lars Jensen
- Elevation: 4,760 ft (1,450 m)

Population (2010)
  - Total: 372
- Time zone: UTC−7 (Mountain (MST))
  - Summer (DST): UTC−6 (MDT)
- ZIP code: 84035
- Area code: 435
- GNIS feature ID: 2629950

Jensen is a census-designated place in eastern Uintah County, Utah, United States. The population was 372 at the 2020 census. It lies along the Green River and U.S. Route 40, southeast of the city of Vernal, the county seat of Uintah County, and about 17 miles west of the Colorado border. Although Jensen is unincorporated, it has a post office, with the ZIP code of 84035.

Jensen was first settled in 1877 and named for Lars Jensen, an early prospector and ferryman. Today its main importance is as the Utah entrance to Dinosaur National Monument.

== Demographics ==
As of the census of 2020, there were 372 people living in the CDP. There were 215 housing units. The racial makeup of the town was 92.7% White, 0.% Black or African American, 3% from some other race, and 4.3% from two or more races. Hispanic or Latino of any race were 6.3% of the population.

== Climate ==
According to the Köppen Climate Classification system, Jensen has a semi-arid climate, abbreviated "BSk" on climate maps.

Climate data for Jensen, Utah, 1991–2020 normals, extremes 1939–present
Month	Jan	Feb	Mar	Apr	May	Jun	Jul	Aug	Sep	Oct	Nov	Dec	Year
Record high °F (°C)	58 (14)	67 (19)	83 (28)	87 (31)	100 (38)	106 (41)	105 (41)	103 (39)	100 (38)	87 (31)	74 (23)	60 (16)	106 (41)
Mean maximum °F (°C)	44.0 (6.7)	54.2 (12.3)	71.3 (21.8)	80.5 (26.9)	88.7 (31.5)	97.0 (36.1)	100.0 (37.8)	97.6 (36.4)	92.2 (33.4)	81.1 (27.3)	63.4 (17.4)	47.7 (8.7)	100.5 (38.1)
Mean daily maximum °F (°C)	29.5 (−1.4)	39.0 (3.9)	55.4 (13.0)	64.5 (18.1)	74.3 (23.5)	85.3 (29.6)	91.8 (33.2)	89.1 (31.7)	80.0 (26.7)	65.1 (18.4)	48.4 (9.1)	32.2 (0.1)	62.9 (17.2)
Daily mean °F (°C)	16.3 (−8.7)	24.7 (−4.1)	38.8 (3.8)	47.3 (8.5)	56.4 (13.6)	65.7 (18.7)	72.2 (22.3)	69.7 (20.9)	60.5 (15.8)	47.4 (8.6)	33.4 (0.8)	19.6 (−6.9)	46.0 (7.8)
Mean daily minimum °F (°C)	3.1 (−16.1)	10.4 (−12.0)	22.3 (−5.4)	30.1 (−1.1)	38.6 (3.7)	46.1 (7.8)	52.5 (11.4)	50.2 (10.1)	41.0 (5.0)	29.6 (−1.3)	18.5 (−7.5)	7.0 (−13.9)	29.1 (−1.6)
Mean minimum °F (°C)	−12.4 (−24.7)	−6.8 (−21.6)	11.1 (−11.6)	19.2 (−7.1)	27.9 (−2.3)	37.2 (2.9)	45.8 (7.7)	42.7 (5.9)	31.1 (−0.5)	18.0 (−7.8)	7.1 (−13.8)	−8.1 (−22.3)	−16.3 (−26.8)
Record low °F (°C)	−36 (−38)	−40 (−40)	−17 (−27)	8 (−13)	18 (−8)	25 (−4)	38 (3)	27 (−3)	17 (−8)	0 (−18)	−12 (−24)	−36 (−38)	−40 (−40)
Average precipitation inches (mm)	0.57 (14)	0.50 (13)	0.55 (14)	0.75 (19)	0.90 (23)	0.55 (14)	0.41 (10)	0.63 (16)	1.08 (27)	1.07 (27)	0.57 (14)	0.68 (17)	8.26 (208)
Average snowfall inches (cm)	5.1 (13)	3.8 (9.7)	0.7 (1.8)	0.6 (1.5)	0.0 (0.0)	0.0 (0.0)	0.0 (0.0)	0.0 (0.0)	0.0 (0.0)	0.2 (0.51)	1.9 (4.8)	6.7 (17)	19.0 (48)
Average extreme snow depth inches (cm)	6.5 (17)	6.5 (17)	2.5 (6.4)	0.2 (0.51)	0.0 (0.0)	0.0 (0.0)	0.0 (0.0)	0.0 (0.0)	0.0 (0.0)	0.1 (0.25)	1.1 (2.8)	4.7 (12)	7.5 (19)
Average precipitation days (≥ 0.01 in)	5.2	5.1	4.9	6.4	7.4	4.4	4.3	5.4	6.0	6.2	4.6	4.5	64.4
Average snowy days (≥ 0.1 in)	3.6	2.8	0.6	0.2	0.0	0.0	0.0	0.0	0.0	0.2	1.1	3.6	12.1
Source 1: NOAA
Source 2: National Weather Service

== See also ==
- List of census-designated places in Utah
