= Upper Wade and Curtis Cabin =

- U.S. National Register of Historic Places
- U.S. Historic district
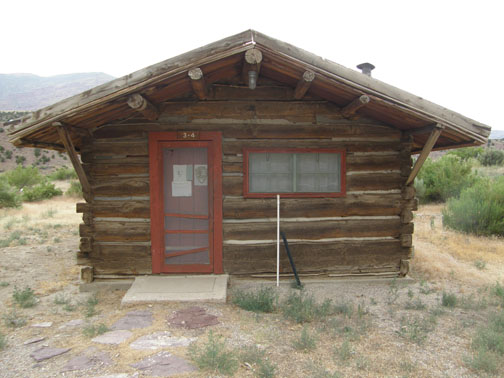

- Location within Colorado Location within the United States
- Location: US 40, Dinosaur, Colorado
- Coordinates: 40°43′38″N 108°52′33″W
- Built: 1933
- Architect: Jack Langely
- MPS: Dinosaur National Monument MRA
- NRHP reference No.: 86003399
- Added to NRHP: December 19, 1986

The Upper Wade and Curtis Cabin was built in 1933 by John Grounds in Dinosaur National Monument. The rustic building served as a guest lodge and ranger station, and is listed on the National Register of Historic Places as the oldest remaining guest accommodation in the park.
