= Earl Douglass =

American paleontologist

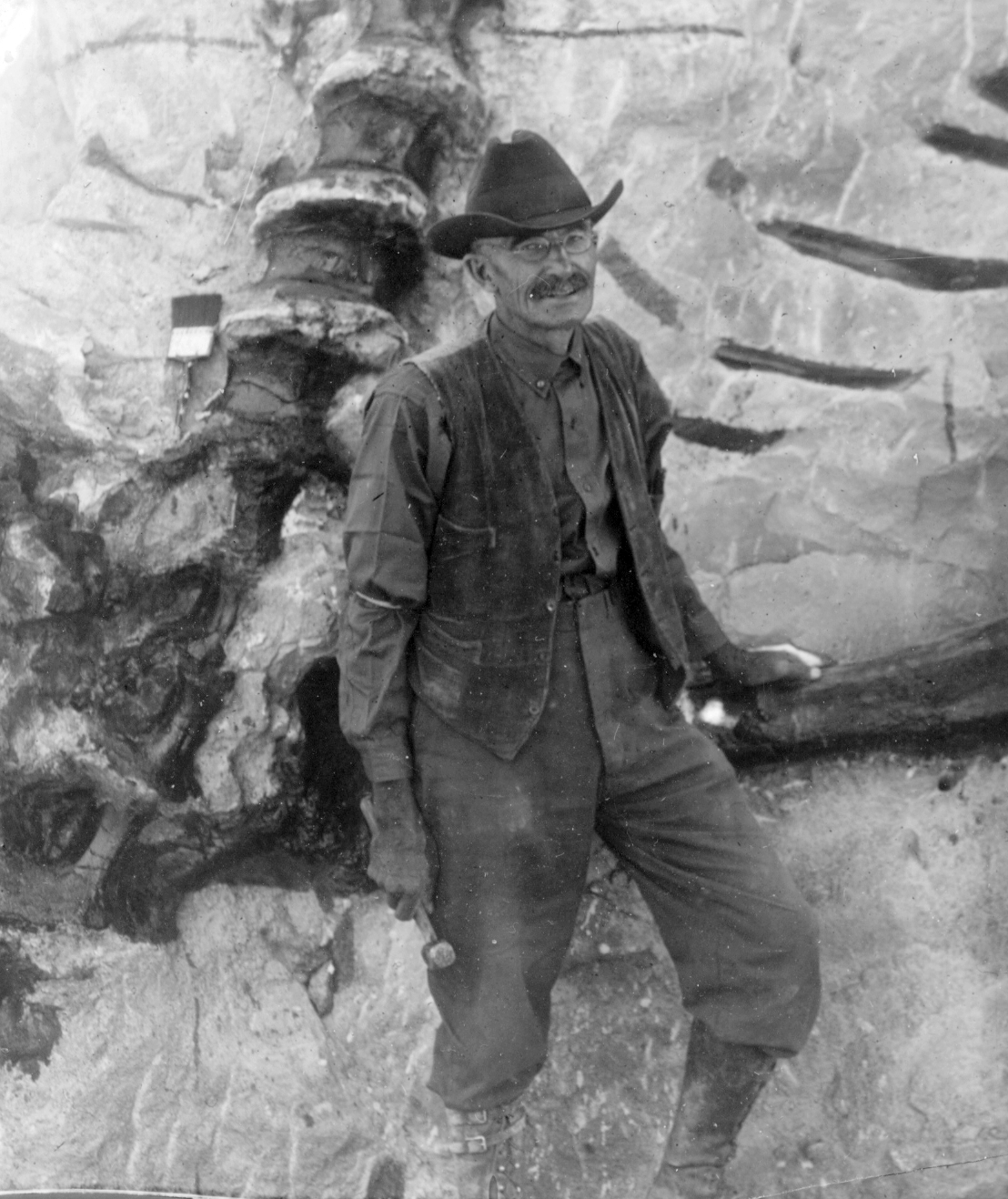
Earl Douglass with his hand on a Diplodocus specimen, Dinosaur National Monument (August 1922).

Earl Douglass (October 28, 1862 – January 13, 1931) was an American paleontologist who discovered the dinosaur Apatosaurus, playing a central role in one of the most important fossil finds in North America. By 1922 Douglass had unearthed and shipped more than 700,000 pounds of material including nearly 20 complete skeletons of Jurassic dinosaurs such as Diplodocus, Dryosaurus, Stegosaurus, Barosaurus, Camarasaurus and Brontosaurus.

== Early life and education ==
Douglass was born on October 28, 1862, in Medford, Minnesota, the son of Fernando and Abigail Louisa Carpenter Douglass.

Douglass's early education was in the Medford public schools and the Pillsbury Academy in Owatonna, Minnesota, where he studied geology, paleontology, osteology, and mammalian anatomy. Later at the Shaw School of Botany at Washington University in St. Louis, he studied systematic botany and plant histology. Douglass received his master's of Science at the University of Montana in 1899. The following year at Princeton University he held a fellowship in biology, and he was granted a fellowship in geology.

== Career ==
In 1899, Douglass taught geology and physical geography at the University of Montana. In 1902, Douglass was hired at the Carnegie Museum of Natural History to work in the field of paleontology and worked there for 15 years. From 1923 to 1924, he worked with the National Museum and University of Utah to obtain dinosaur fossils and discovered a large part of a skeleton known as Barosaurus lentus. The following year, he was employed by the University of Utah to excavate dinosaur bones.

After a botanical trip to Mexico in 1890, Douglass became assistant to Professor William Trelease at the Missouri Botanical Garden. Because he did notable research on oil, oil shale, asphalts, and other mineral deposits, he became consulting geologist for companies engaged in these fields in Utah, Colorado, Arizona and Texas. His final years were spent as a geologist.

== Work and contributions ==
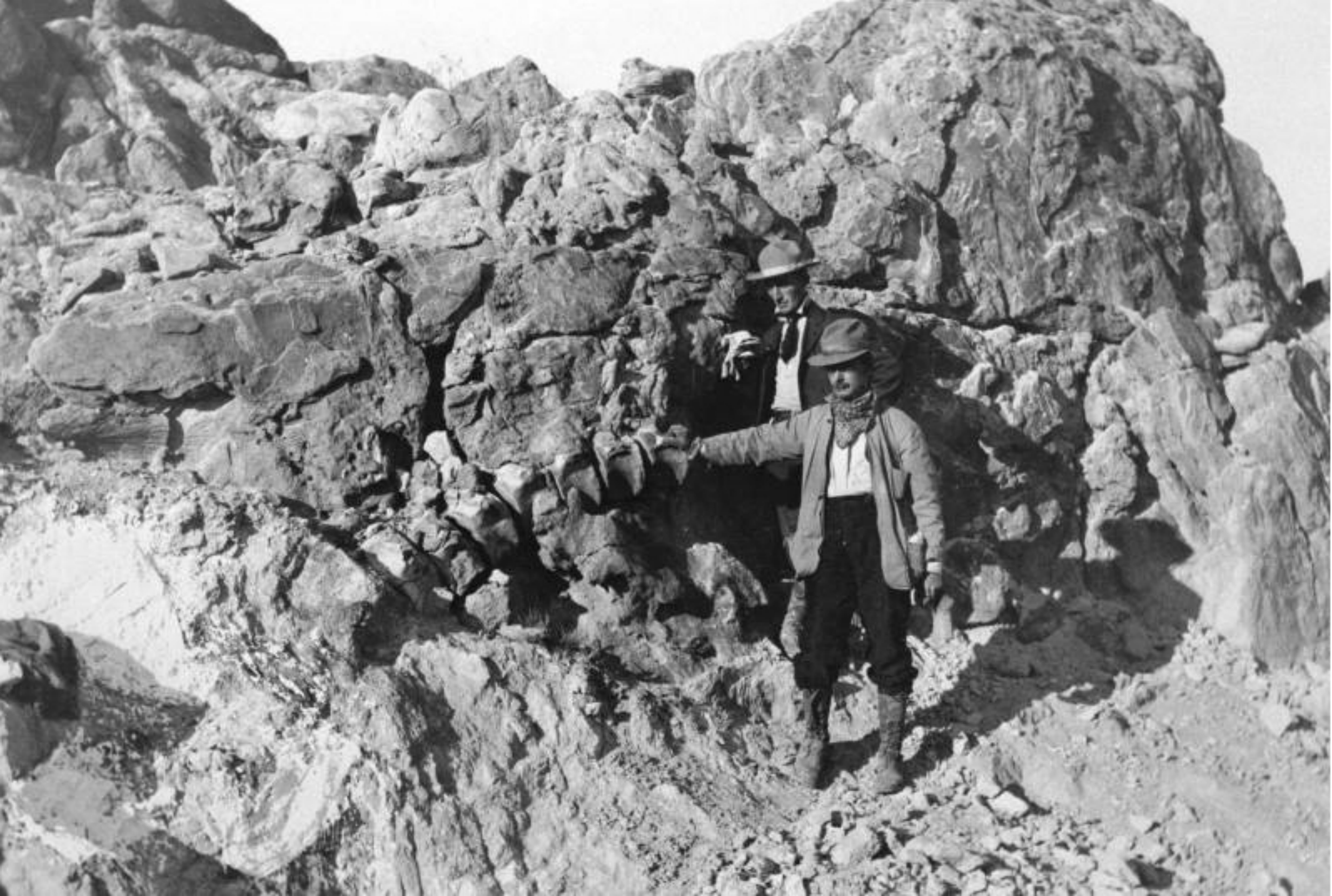
Earl Douglass a day or two after the dinosaur discovery (~August 18-20, 1909).

Douglass played a central role in one of the most important fossil discoveries in North America. In 1905, he was sent to Minnesota, North Dakota, Montana, and Idaho to collect vertebrate and invertebrate fossils. Additionally, he obtained data to solve certain geological problems and conduct geological explorations. In 1907, Douglass traveled to the Uintah Basin in northeastern Utah to explore the Uinta Formation south of Vernal, Utah for fossil mammals. He returned the following year, but was interrupted in July by a letter from Carnegie Museum director J. Holland who directed him to search for a dinosaur skeleton. He began exploring the hills along the Green River near Jensen, Utah, and came upon the tail section of an Apatosaurus in the Morrison Formation. He wrote the famous lines in his diary: "At last in the top of the ledge where the softer overlying [sandstone] beds form a divide -- a kind of saddle, I saw eight of the tail bones of a Brontosaurus in exact position. It was a beautiful sight." At first Douglass thought he had just one skeleton, and not until December did he realize just how extensive the bone deposit was in a letter to director Holland: “... the ledge is full of bones...We realize that we have a stupendous task and the men are working like beavers... If we stopped to consider what a terrible lot of work there is to do we might fall over...” The tail vertebrae connected to a nearly complete skeleton that was formally named Apatosaurus louisae, after Carnegie’s wife Louise. Excavating the site would occupy him and his crew for 13 years.

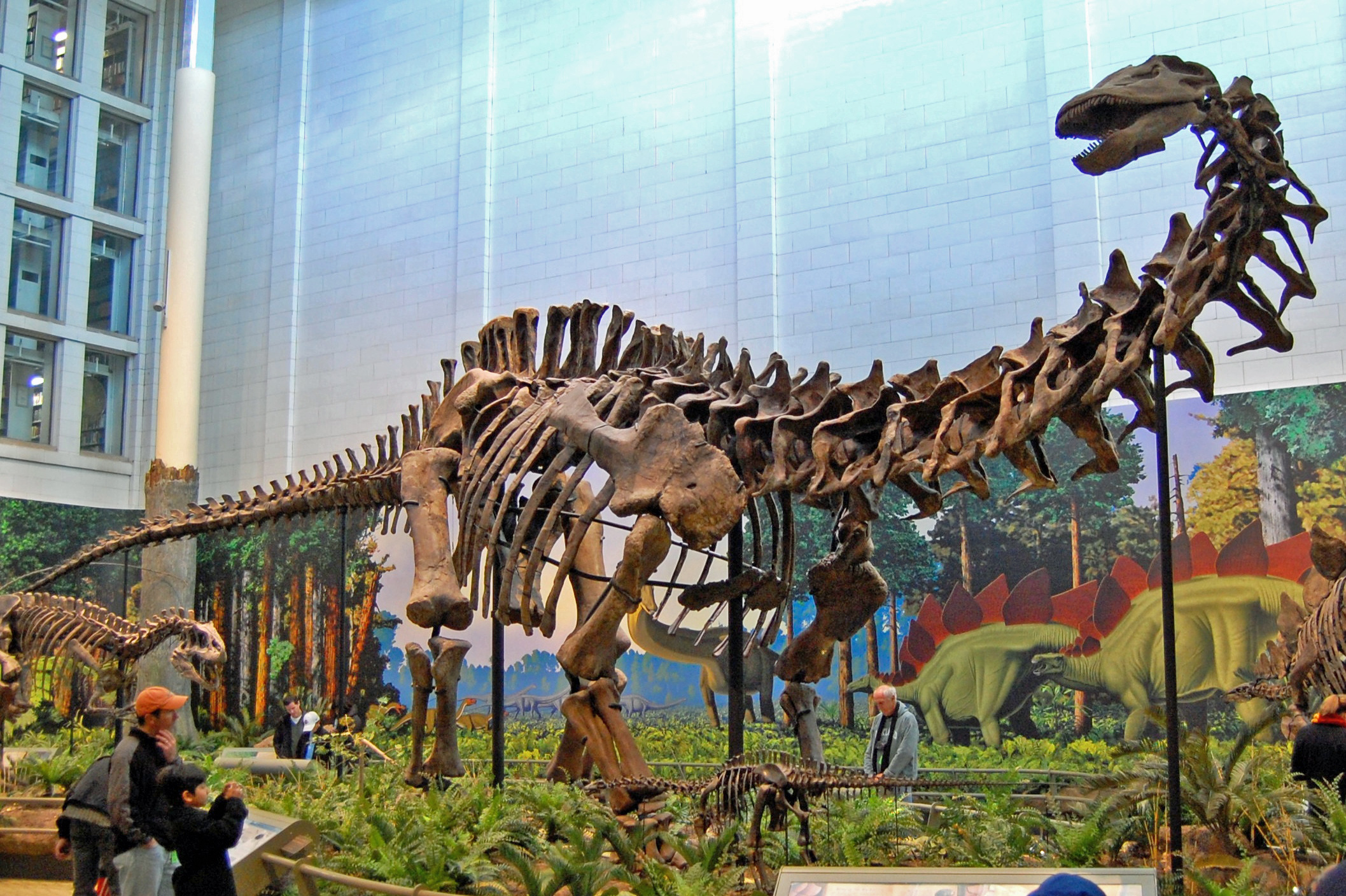
Apatosaurus louisae (specimen CM 3018), exhibited at the CMNH

== Personal life ==
Douglass married Pearl Charlotte Goetschius on October 20, 1905, and a few years later they had a son, Gawin Earl Douglass. Douglass died on January 13, 1931, in Salt Lake City, Utah.

== External sources ==
- Earl Douglass Papers at University of Utah Digital Library, Marriott Library Special Collections
