= Denis Julien Inscription (Moffat County, Colorado) =

- Julien, Denis, Inscription
- U.S. National Register of Historic Places
- Location within Colorado Location within the United States
- Location: US 40, Dinosaur, Colorado
- Coordinates: 40°32′43″N 109°0′55″W
- Area: less than one acre
- Artist: Denis Julien
- MPS: Dinosaur National Monument MRA
- NRHP reference No.: 86003395
- Added to NRHP: December 19, 1986

The Denis Julien Inscription was left on a rock face in 1838 (188 years ago) along the Green River in Moffat County, Colorado by Denis Julien, a French-American trapper who was one of the few Europeans in the area in the 1830s. Julien made a practice of leaving his mark on locations along the Green and Colorado rivers, leaving at least eight such marks. Four, including the Colorado mark, are listed on the National Register of Historic Places.

The inscription reads:

DJ 1838

It is about 5 feet (1.5 m) above normal water level, but below flood level. The inscription is located in Whirlpool Canyon in what is now Dinosaur National Monument. The inscription was placed on the National Register of Historic Places on December 19, 1986.

== See also ==
- Denis Julien Inscription (Grand County, Utah), Canyonlands National Park
- Denis Julien Inscription (San Juan County, Utah), Canyonlands National Park
- Julien Inscription Panel, Arches National Park
