= Dinosaur National Monument =

National monument in Colorado and Utah, United States

- IUCN category V (protected landscape/seascape)
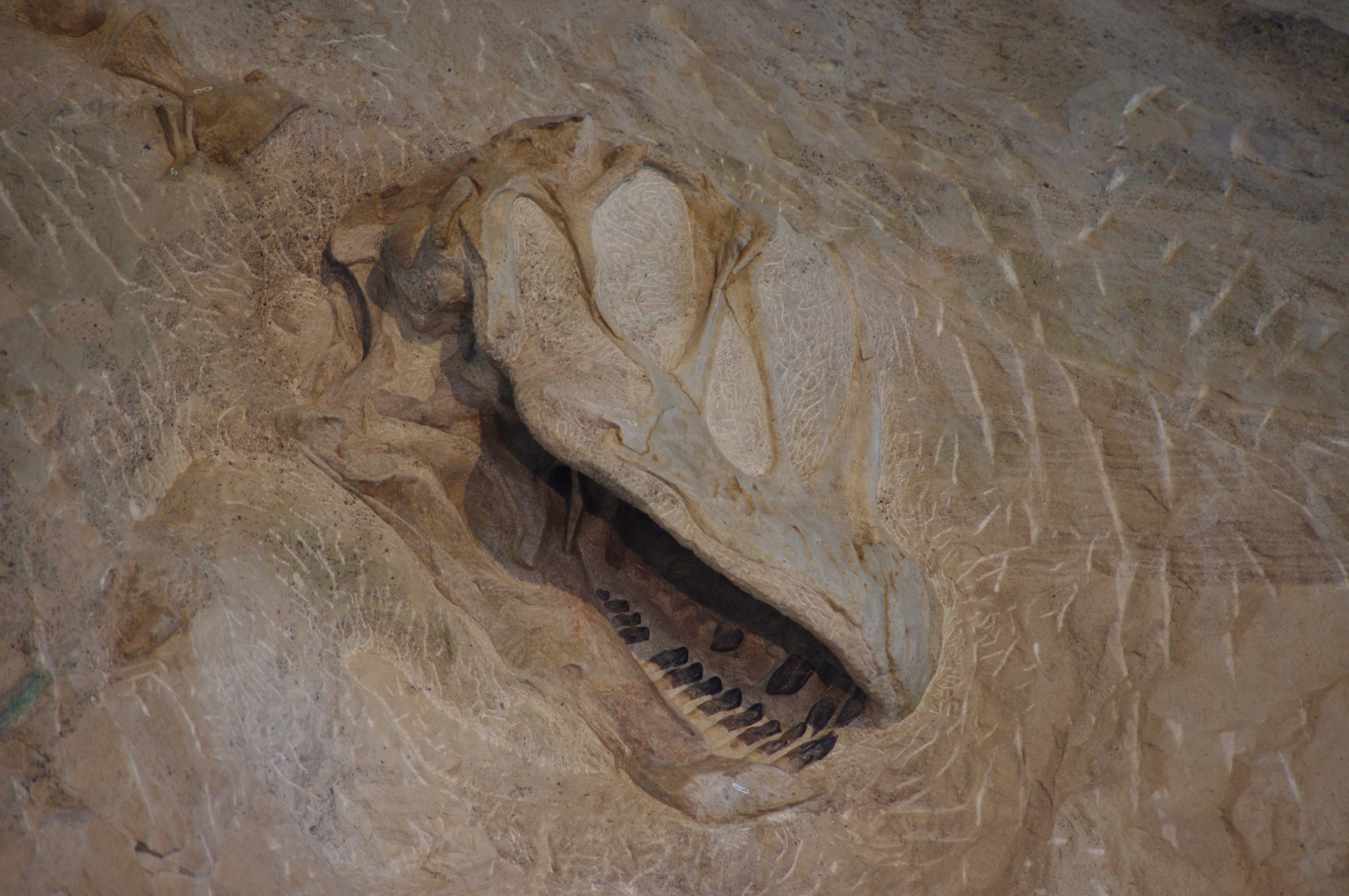
- A dinosaur skull embedded in rock at Dinosaur National Monument

- Location within the United States
- Interactive map of Dinosaur National Monument
- Location: Moffat County, Colorado and Uintah County, Utah, U.S.
- Nearest city: Vernal, Utah
- Coordinates: 40°30′N 108°57′W
- Area: 210,844 acres (853.26 km^{2})
- Established: October 4, 1915
- Visitors: 315,725 (in 2025)
- Governing body: U.S. National Park Service
- Website: Dinosaur National Monument

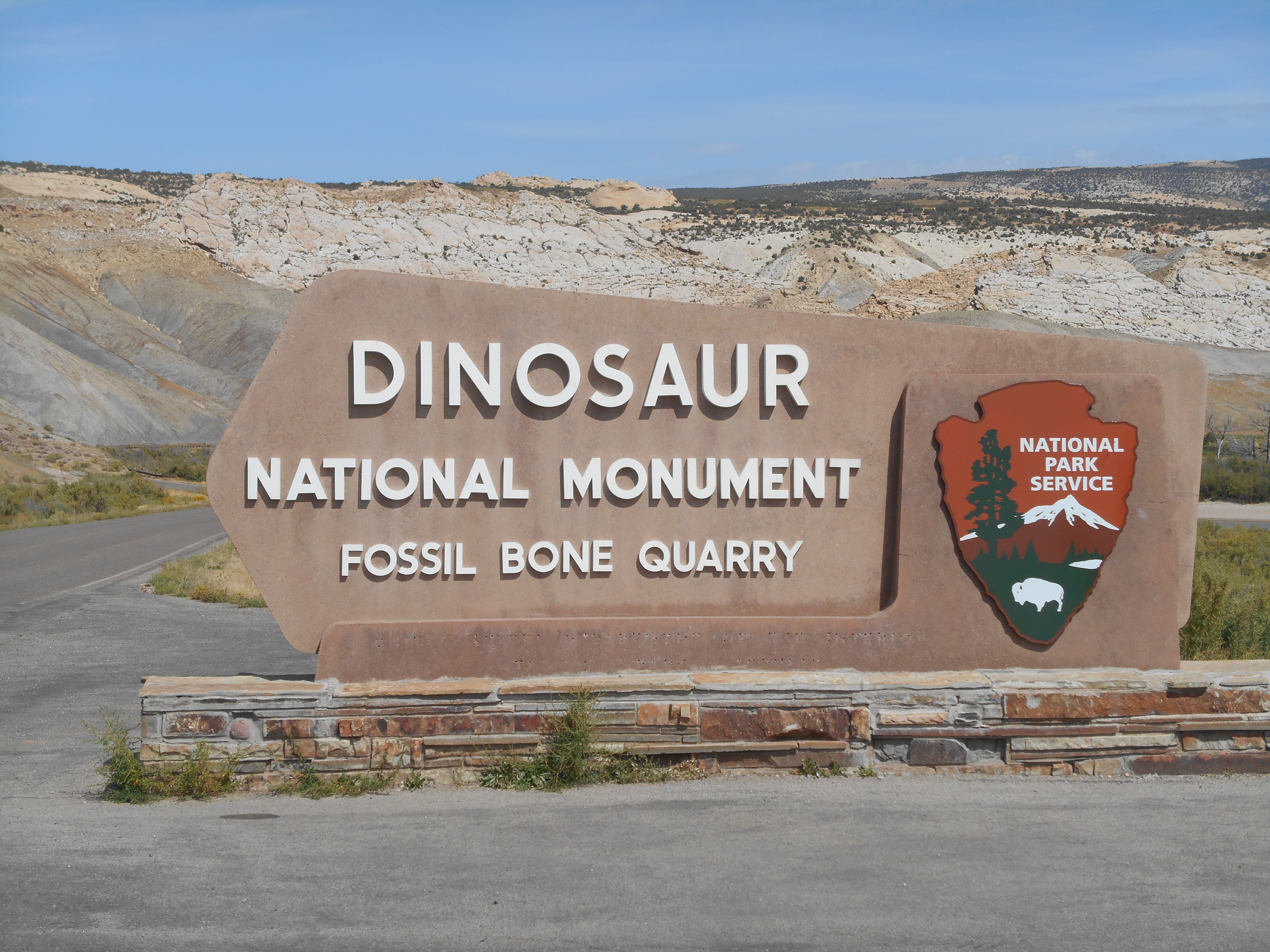
Dinosaur National Monument entrance

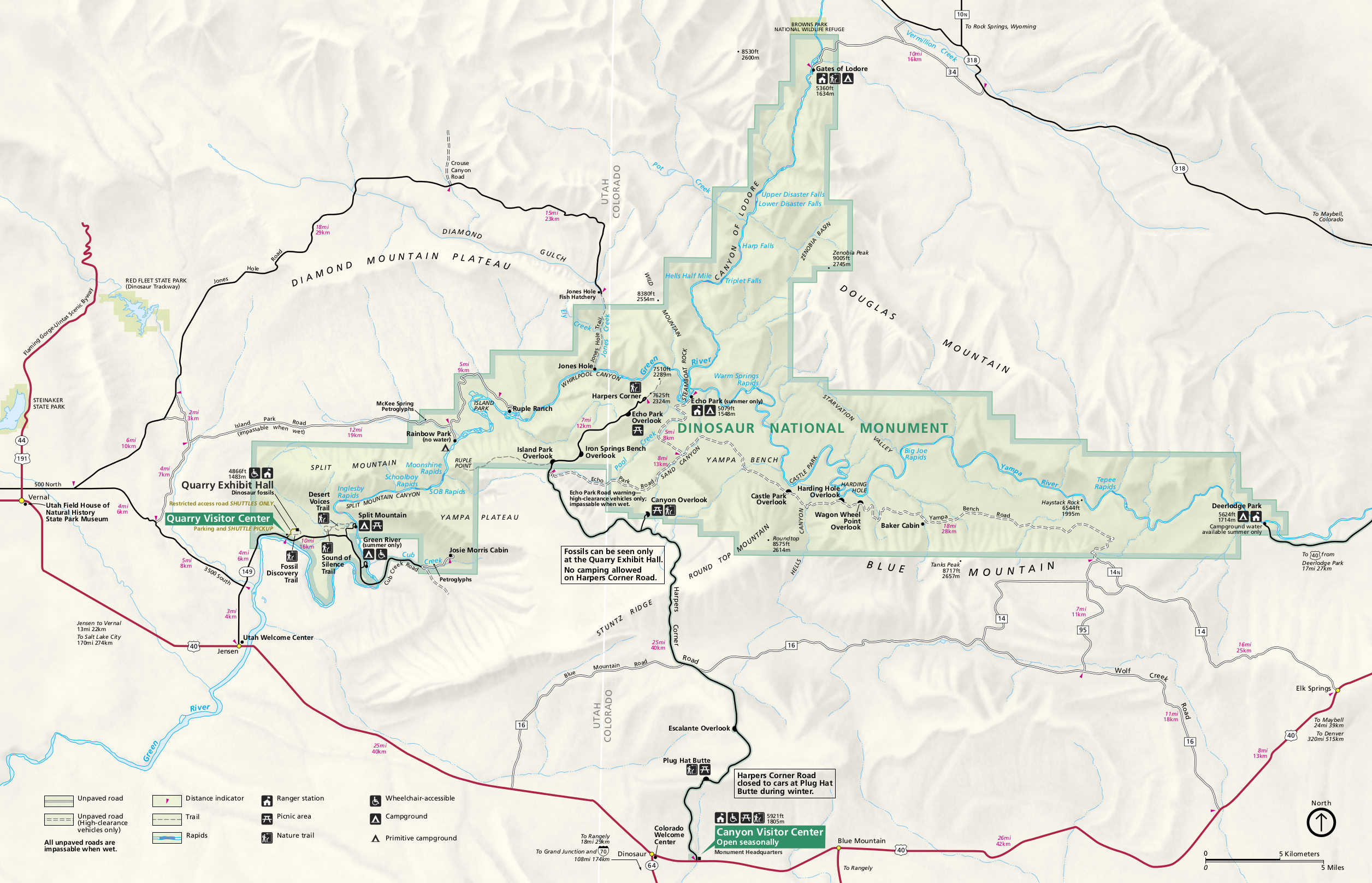
Map showing the boundaries of Dinosaur National Monument

Dinosaur National Monument is an American national monument located on the southeast flank of the Uinta Mountains on the border between Colorado and Utah at the confluence of the Green and Yampa rivers. Although most of the monument area is in Moffat County, Colorado, the Dinosaur Quarry is located in Utah, north of the town of Jensen, Utah. The nearest Colorado town is Dinosaur while the nearest city is Vernal, Utah.

Originally preserved in 1915 to protect its famous Dinosaur Quarry, the monument was greatly expanded in 1938 to include its wealth of natural history. The park's wild landscapes, topography, geology, paleontology, and history make it a unique resource for both science and recreation. The park contains over 800 paleontological sites and has fossils of dinosaurs including Allosaurus, Deinonychus, Abydosaurus, and various sauropods. The Abydosaurus consists of a nearly complete skull, the lower jaw, and first four neck vertebrae. The specimen was found at the base of the Mussentuchit Member of the Cedar Mountain Formation and is the holotype for the species.

Paleontologist Earl Douglass of the Carnegie Museum discovered eight vertebrae of an Apatosaurus on August 17, 1909, which became the first dinosaur skeleton discovered and excavated at the new Carnegie Quarry. The area around the quarry was declared a national monument on October 4, 1915. The International Dark-Sky Association designated Dinosaur National Monument an International Dark Sky Park in April 2019.

== Geology ==
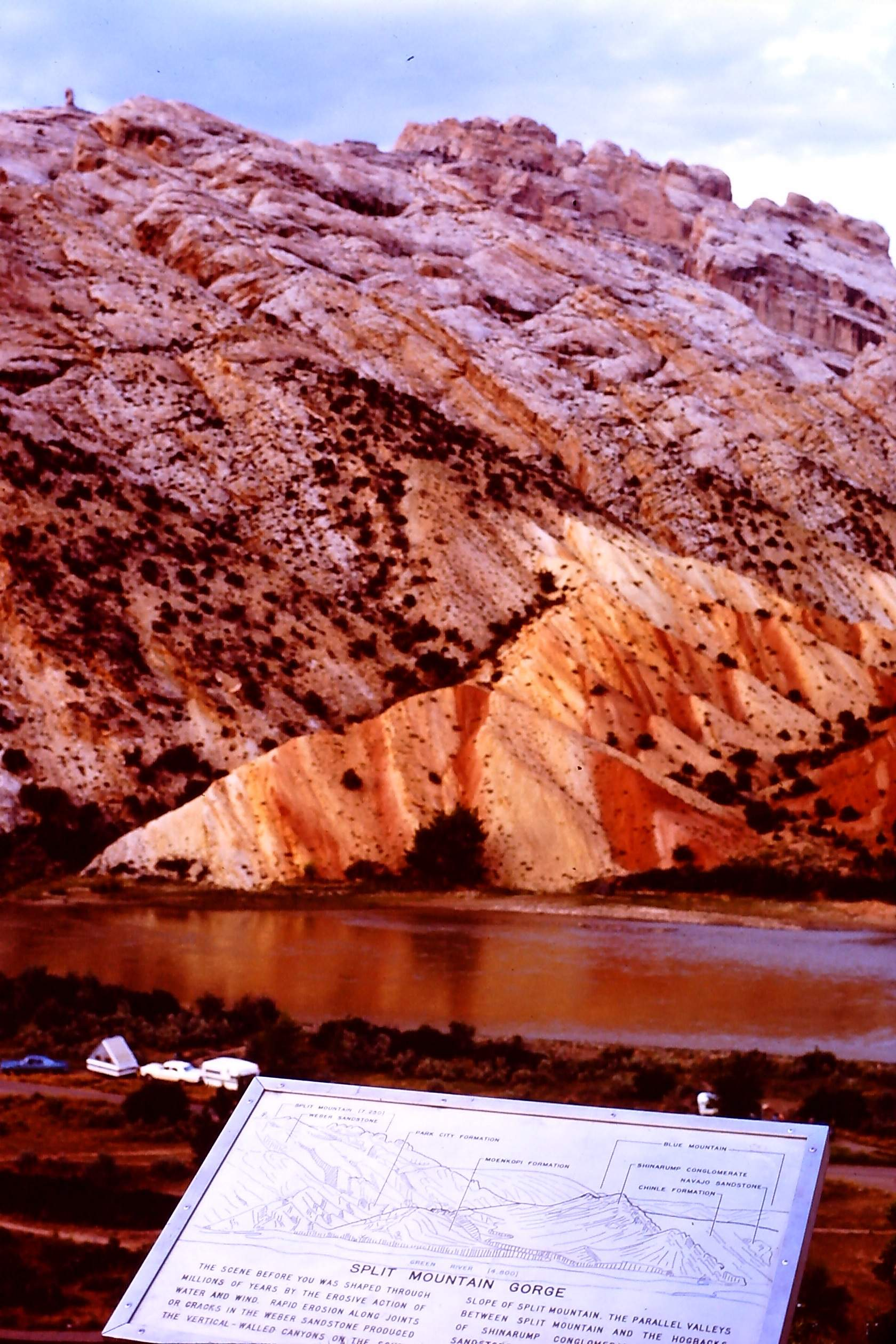
Split Mountain Green River

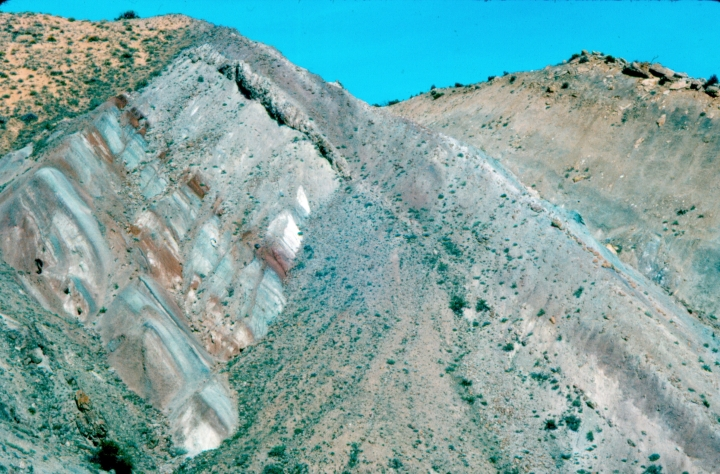
Multicolored beds of the Brushy Basin Member of the Morrison Formation

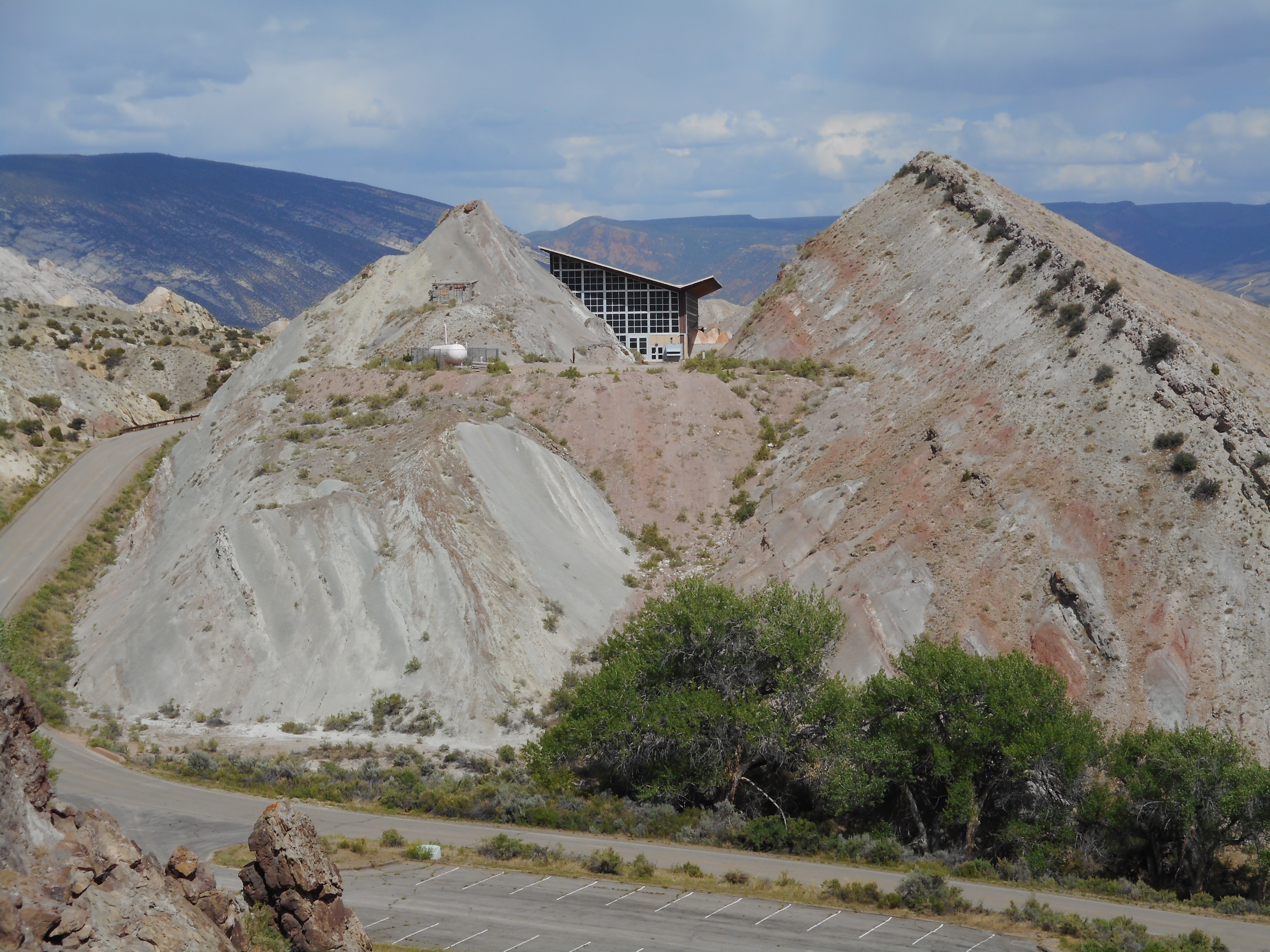
The Quarry Visitor Center in context to the landscape. View is from the west.

The rock layer enclosing the fossils is a sandstone and conglomerate bed of alluvial or river bed origin known as the Morrison Formation from the Jurassic Period some 150 million years old. The dinosaurs and other ancient animals were carried by the river system which eventually entombed their remains in Utah.

The pile of sediments were later buried and lithified into solid rock. The layers of rock were later uplifted and tilted to their present angle by the mountain building forces that formed the Uinta Mountains during the Laramide orogeny. Erosion later exposed the layers at the surface to be found by paleontologists.

== History ==
=== Fremont people ===
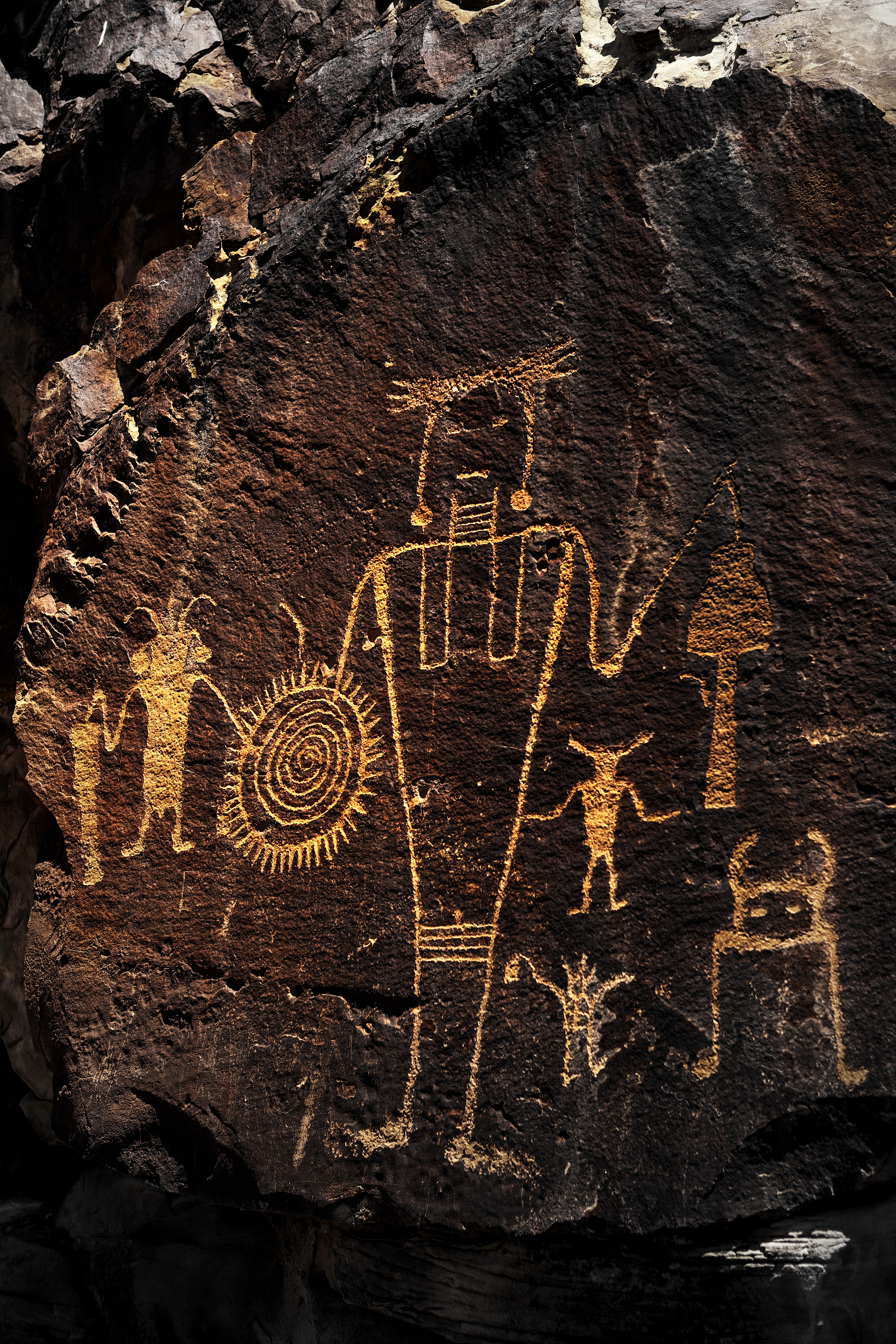
Petroglyphs at McKee Spring in Dinosaur National Monument

The Fremont people lived in the area of what is now Dinosaur National Monument before the 14th century, with archaeological evidence dating from c. 200 to c. 1300. Archaeologists first studied and named the Fremont culture along the Fremont River in south-central Utah and have since traced it through much of the Green and Colorado River drainages.

The Fremont did not build large permanent dwellings; instead, they lived in small bands within natural shelters, such as rock overhangs or shallow caves, or small villages. They consumed plant foods, such as pine nuts, berries, and cactus fruits, as well as wild game, including mule deer, bighorn sheep, smaller mammals, and birds. They also grew corn, beans, and squash, sometimes using irrigation techniques.

The fate of the Fremont culture is unclear. Recent theories suggest that the Fremont's lifestyle may have changed due to drought or other climate factors, dwindling natural resources, or the influence of other neighboring cultures. They left evidence of their presence in the form of petroglyphs and pictographs of human and animal figures, and abstract designs. Human figures typically have trapezoidal bodies and elaborate decorations that suggest headdresses, earrings, necklaces, or shields. The animal figures include bighorn sheep, birds, snakes, and lizards. Purely abstract or geometric designs, such as circles, spirals, and various combinations of lines, are common. Many designs in the monument are accessible for close viewing, along four trails in Utah, one of which is near the visitor center, and a fifth trail in Colorado.

=== Early scientific explorations ===
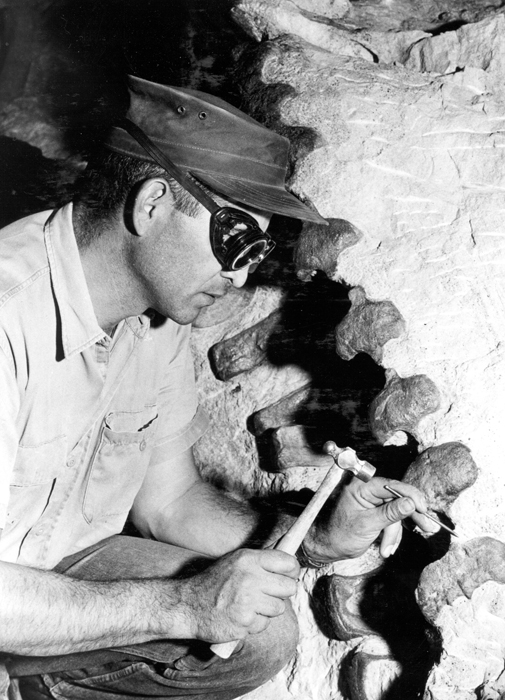
Paleontologist chips rock matrix from a column of vertebrae in the Dinosaur Quarry.

The dinosaur fossil beds (bone beds) were discovered in 1909 by Earl Douglass, a paleontologist working and collecting for the Carnegie Museum of Natural History. He and his crews excavated thousands of fossils and shipped them back to the museum in Pittsburgh, Pennsylvania for study and display.

=== National monument ===
President Woodrow Wilson proclaimed the dinosaur beds as Dinosaur National Monument in 1915. The monument boundaries were expanded in 1938 from the original 80 acres (0.13 sq mi; 0.32 km^{2}) surrounding the dinosaur quarry in Utah, to 210,844 acres (329 sq mi; 853 km^{2}) in Utah and Colorado, encompassing the river canyons of the Green and Yampa.

=== Echo Park Dam controversy ===
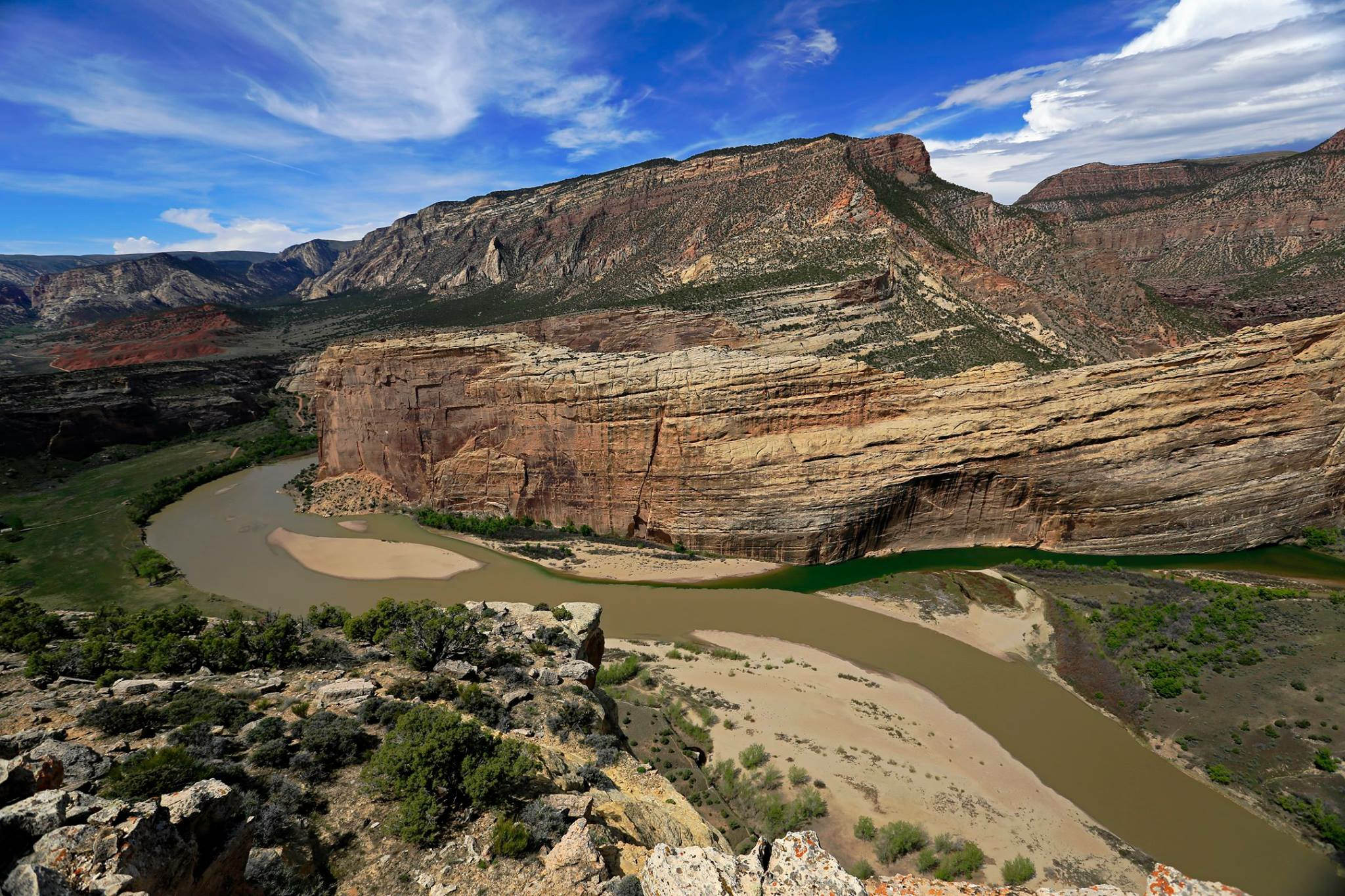
Confluence of the Green and Yampa Rivers

The plans made by the U.S. Bureau of Reclamation on a ten-dam, billion dollar Colorado River Storage Project began to arouse opposition in the early 1950s when it was announced that one of the proposed dams would be at Echo Park, in the middle of Dinosaur National Monument. The controversy assumed major proportions, dominating conservation politics for years. David Brower, executive director of the Sierra Club, and Howard Zahniser of The Wilderness Society led an unprecedented nationwide campaign to preserve the free-flowing rivers and scenic canyons of the Green and Yampa Rivers. They argued that if a national monument was not safe from development, how could any wildland be kept intact?

On the other side of the argument were powerful members of Congress from western states, who were committed to the project in order to secure water rights, obtain cheap hydroelectric power and develop reservoirs as tourist destinations. After much debate, Congress settled on a compromise that eliminated Echo Park Dam and authorized the rest of the project. The Colorado River Storage Project Act became law on April 11, 1956. It stated, "that no dam or reservoir constructed under the authorization of the Act shall be within any National Park or Monument".

=== Historic places ===
Places on the list of National Register of Historic Places include:

Prehistoric sites
- Castle Park Archeological District, a prehistoric residential site with inhabition during 1500 - 1000 BC and again from AD 1000 - 1899 by the Prehistoric Fremont culture, Ute and Shoshone people.
- Mantle's Cave is a prehistoric Fremont culture residential site from 499 BC - AD 1749.
Other sites
- Josie Bassett Morris Ranch Complex
- Denis Julien Inscription
- Rial Chew Ranch Complex
- Upper Wade and Curtis Cabin

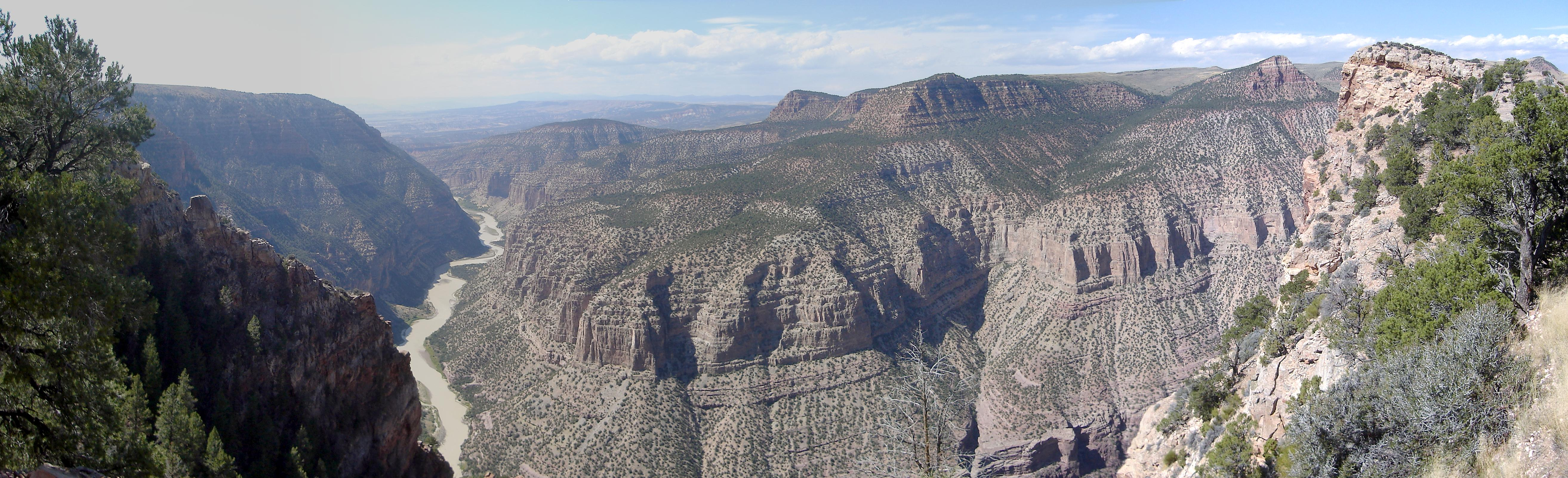
Green River Canyon in Dinosaur National Monument viewed west from Harper's Corner

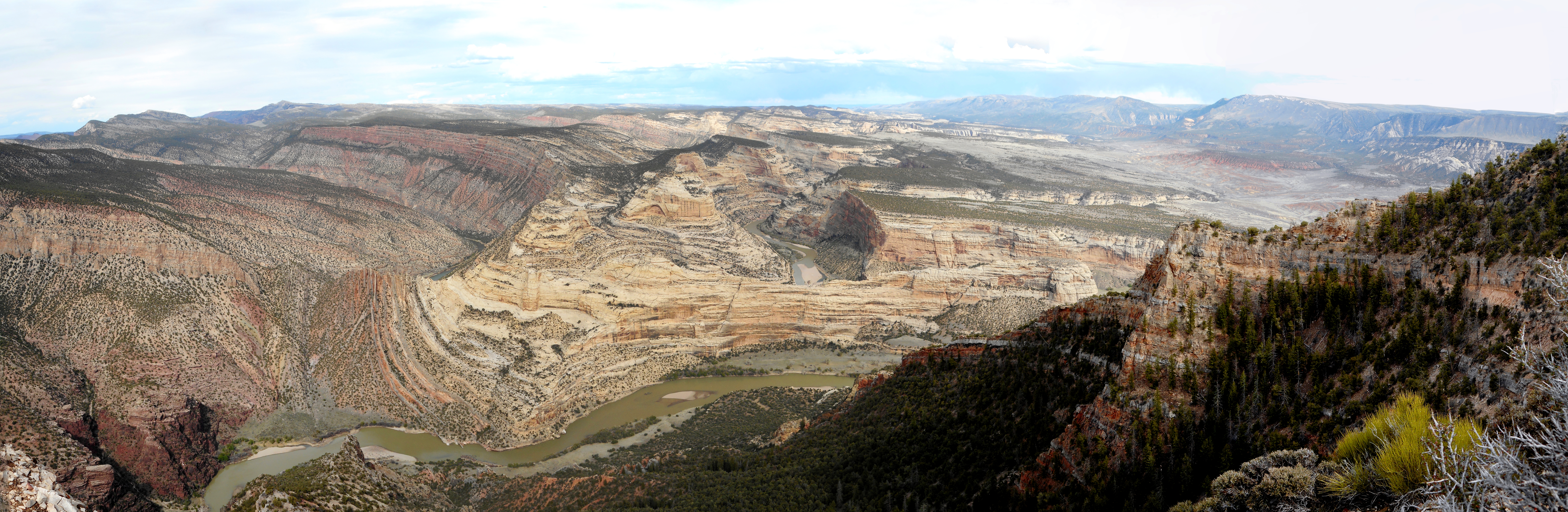
View east from Harpers Corner showing the local geology

== Climate ==
The Dinosaur National Monument sits on a vast area of desert land in Northwestern Colorado and Northeastern Utah. Typical of high deserts, summer temperatures can be exceedingly hot, while winter temperatures can be very cold. Snowfall is common, but the snow melts rapidly in the arid and sunny climates of these states. Rainfall is very low, and the evaporation rate classifies the area as desert, even though the rainfall exceeds 10 inches.

Climate data for Dinosaur National Monument
Month	Jan	Feb	Mar	Apr	May	Jun	Jul	Aug	Sep	Oct	Nov	Dec	Year
Mean daily maximum °F (°C)	33.0 (0.6)	39.0 (3.9)	50.4 (10.2)	60.8 (16.0)	71.9 (22.2)	83.2 (28.4)	90.5 (32.5)	87.9 (31.1)	77.7 (25.4)	63.6 (17.6)	45.7 (7.6)	34.2 (1.2)	61.5 (16.4)
Mean daily minimum °F (°C)	10.8 (−11.8)	15.2 (−9.3)	25.0 (−3.9)	31.8 (−0.1)	40.5 (4.7)	48.9 (9.4)	56.6 (13.7)	54.7 (12.6)	45.5 (7.5)	34.9 (1.6)	23.3 (−4.8)	12.7 (−10.7)	33.3 (0.7)
Average precipitation inches (mm)	0.64 (16)	0.56 (14)	0.88 (22)	1.17 (30)	1.30 (33)	1.06 (27)	1.01 (26)	0.89 (23)	1.24 (31)	1.46 (37)	0.80 (20)	0.62 (16)	11.64 (296)
Average snowfall inches (cm)	9.2 (23)	6.6 (17)	5.9 (15)	3.5 (8.9)	0.7 (1.8)	0.2 (0.51)	0.0 (0.0)	0.0 (0.0)	0.2 (0.51)	1.6 (4.1)	4.7 (12)	8.3 (21)	41.1 (104)
Source: The Western Regional Climate Center

== Features ==
=== The quarry ===
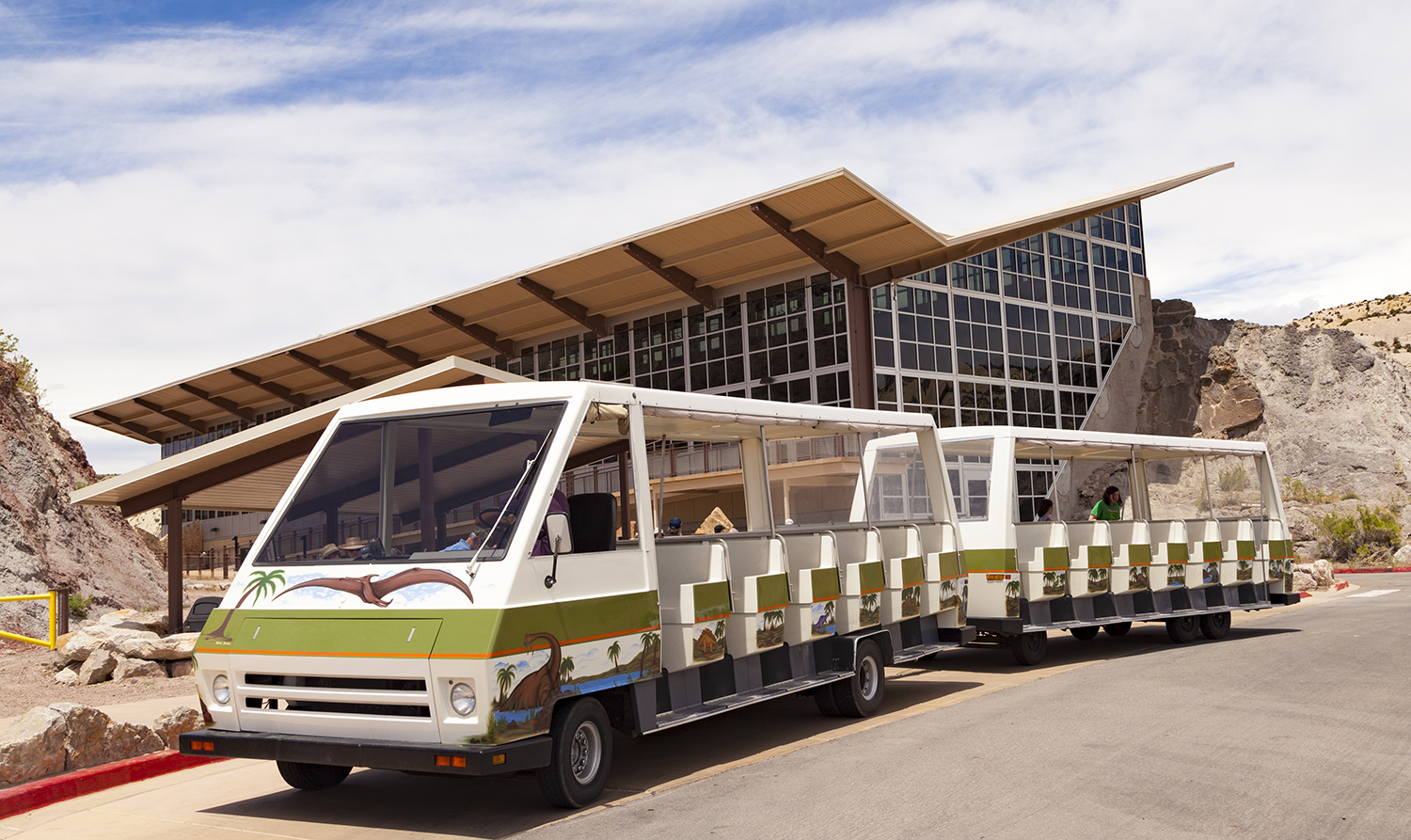
The Quarry Exhibit Hall

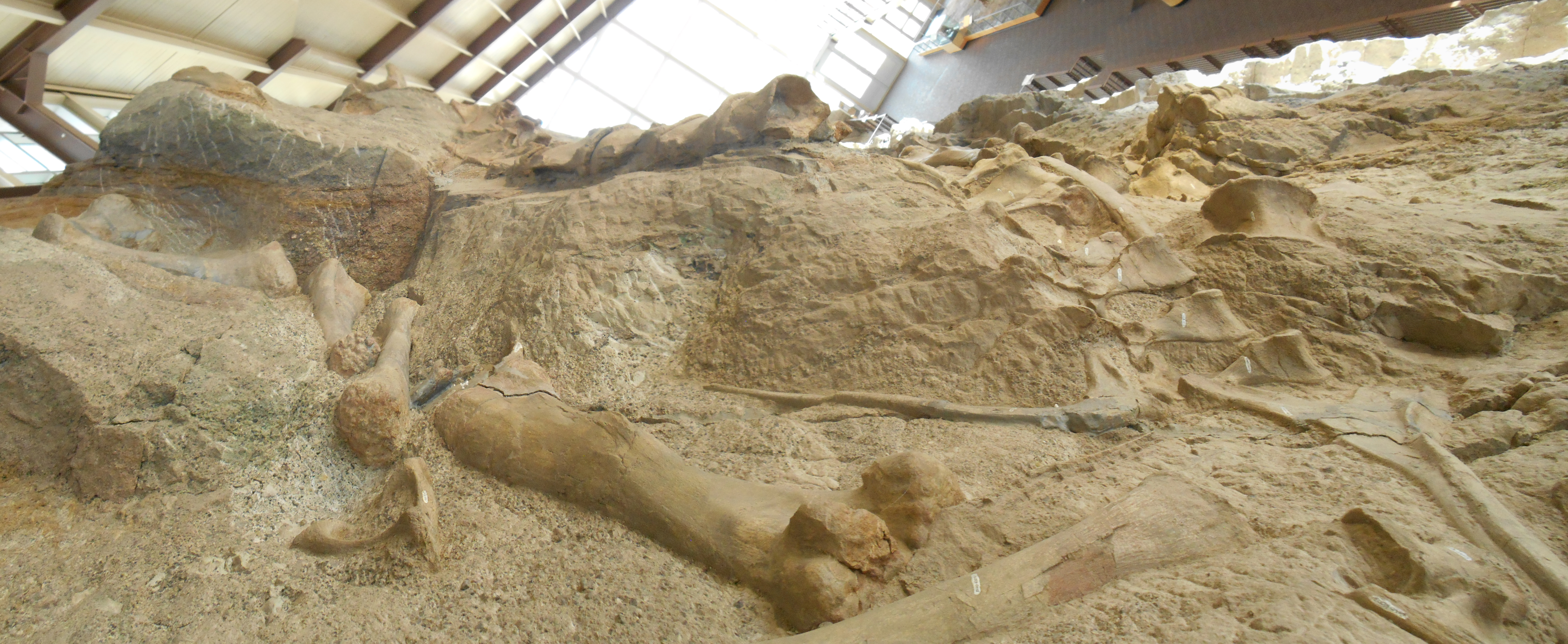
Dinosaur bones on the quarry wall viewed east. This shows the bones lay three-dimensionally in the sandstone.

Revised quarry map combining the original Douglass map, later historical data and current bones.

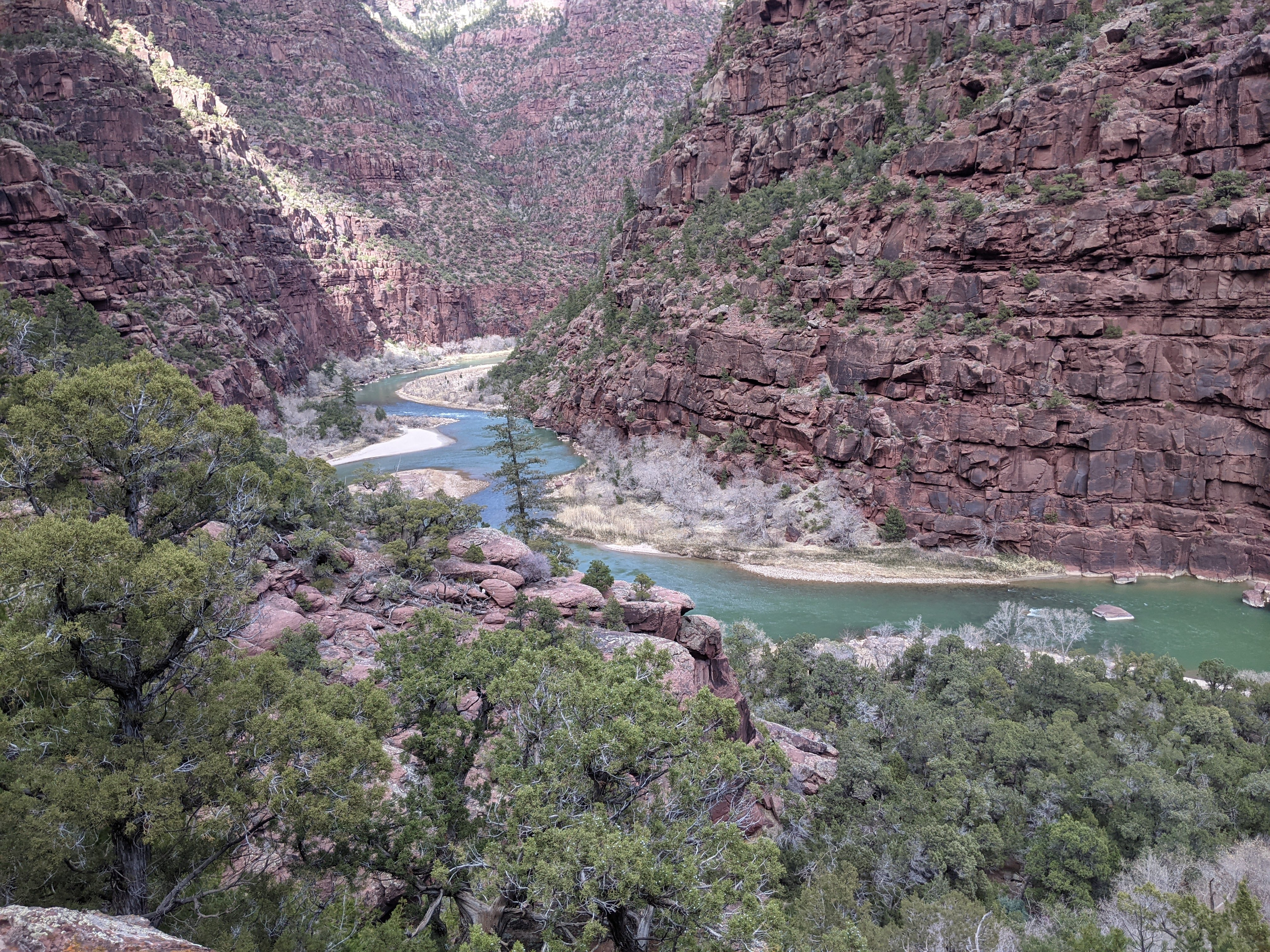
The Green River in Dinosaur National Monument

The "Wall of Bones" located within the Dinosaur Quarry building in the park consists of a steeply tilted (67° from horizontal) rock layer which contains thousands of dinosaur fossils. The preserved section is only a portion of what was originally present when Douglass made his discovery as seen on the map above. When work ceased in 1922, a portion of the quarry was left for future development. This work began as part of President Franklin Roosevelt's Civil Works Administration, which provided employment during the Depression under the Transient Relief Service and later under the Works Progress Administration. This work included constructing a road to the quarry, removal of overburden covering the bone-bearing strata, and building of a small, temporary museum. World War II interrupted work, but this was resumed in 1951 with the building of a small metal building over the east portion of the quarry to test whether bone was abundant enough to warrant a larger, more permanent building. This more permanent building was erected in the mid-1950s as part of the National Park Service Mission 66 plan. The architectural design was high controversial for its ultra-modern use of glass, steel and concrete ramp that spiraled around a cylindrical office tower. The building opened at the dedication ceremony on June 1, 1958. The design had two levels and abundant natural light so that visitors could watch technicians remove the hard rock to reveal the excavated fossil bones in-situ.

=== Quarry Visitor Center ===
- Quarry Visitor Center
- U.S. National Register of Historic Places
- U.S. National Historic Landmark
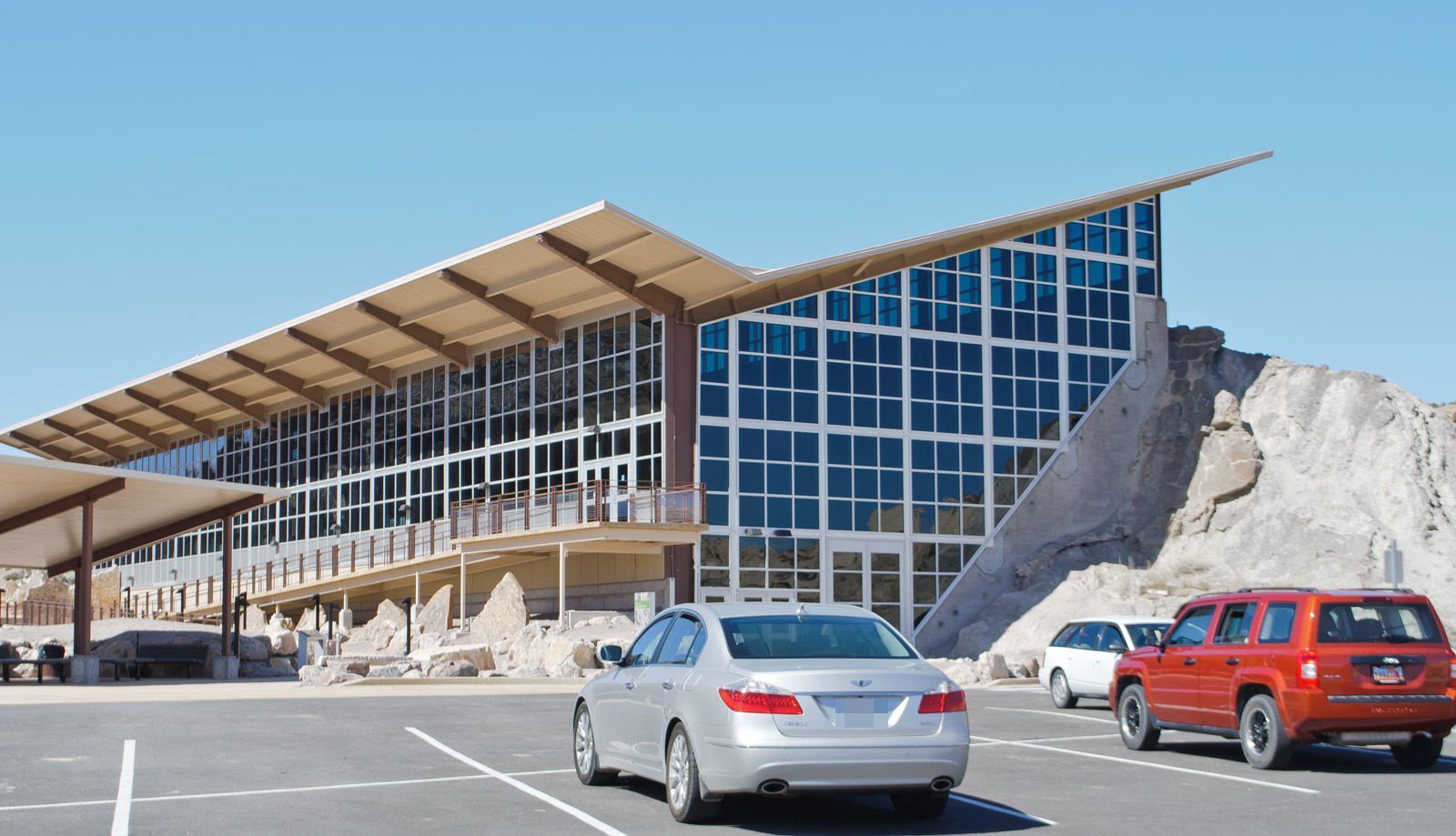
- Quarry Visitor Center, March 2012

- Location within Utah Location within the United States
- Location: Dinosaur National Monument, Utah; United States
- Coordinates: 40.4406°N 109.3013°W
- Built: 1958
- Architect: Anshen & Allen; Richard Hein; Robert D. Dewell-Structural Engineer
- MPS: Dinosaur National Monument MRA
- NRHP reference No.: 86003401

Significant dates
- Added to NRHP: December 19, 1986
- Designated NHL: January 3, 2001

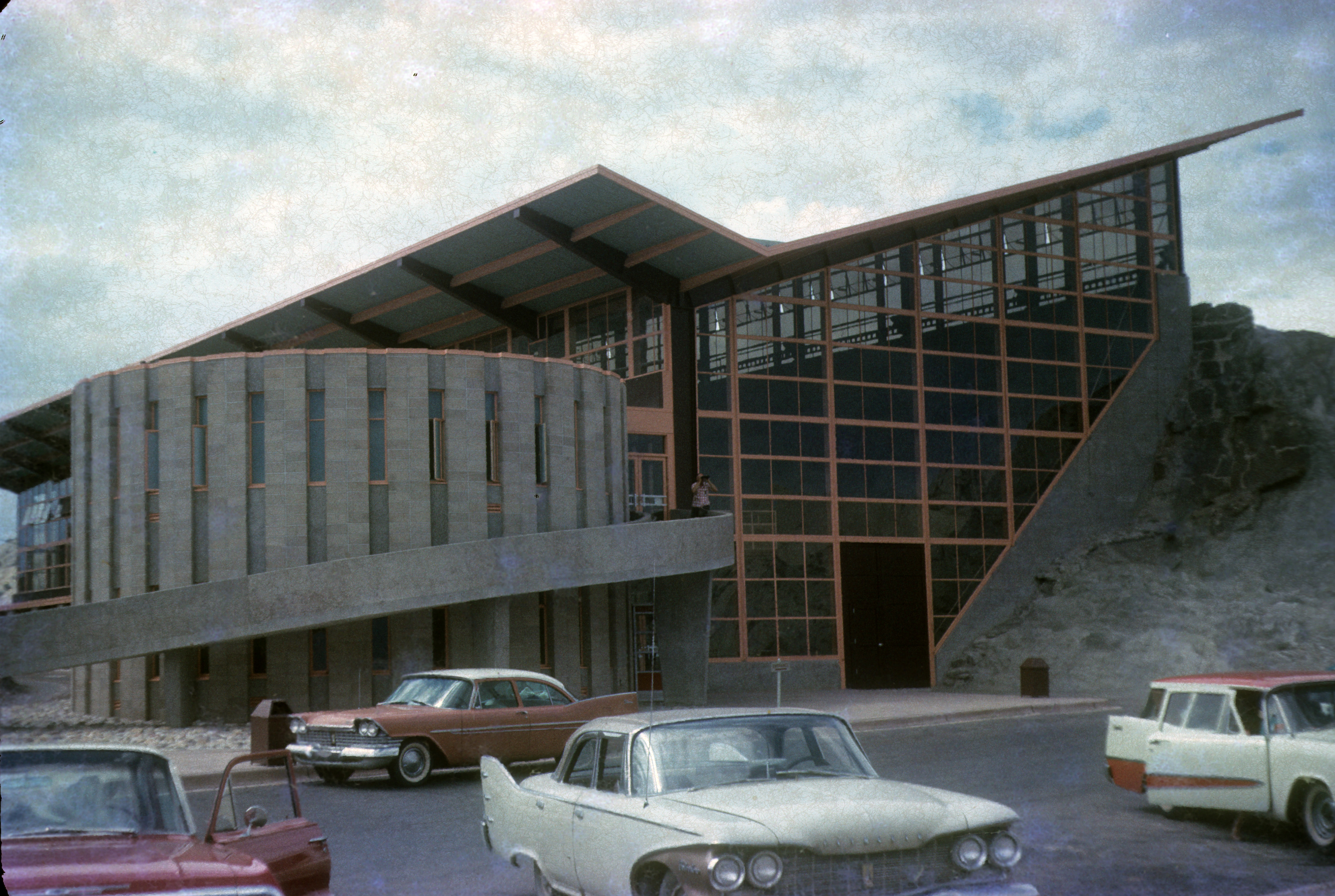
Dinosaur exhibit structure at Vernal Utah taken in July of 1963

The Quarry Visitor Center was built as part of the National Park Service's (NPS) Mission 66 program of modern architectural design in the US national parks. This visitor center exemplifies the philosophy of locating visitor facilities immediately at the resource being interpreted. The NPS now refers to the new visitor center (built in 2011 about 1,800 feet [550 m] to the southwest) as the "Quarry Visitor Center" and the historical building as the "Quarry Exhibit Hall".

A visitor center was built in part to attract visitors to the little-visited monument, which had been threatened with flooding by the Echo Park Dam, as a means of guarding against renewed reservoir proposals. The visitor center's concept was first expressed in 1916 when George Otis Smith, the director of the U.S. Geological Survey, suggested that the specimens be displayed in the northern canyon wall. Local citizens, including the dinosaur quarry's discoverer Earl Douglass, proposed a skylit shelter for the display. A temporary shelter for the bones and their excavators was finally built in 1936. A preliminary design in January 1937 was produced by a group including the Park Service Western Office of Design and Construction, the American Museum of Natural History and the directorate of the Park Service that closely resembled the eventual design by Anshen & Allen Associates. A number of succeeding designs followed, becoming more elaborate and departing from this concept. No funding emerged for the design, but a new wood and corrugated sheet metal shelter was built in 1951, reminiscent of the 1916 proposal. The visitor center was completed in 1958, and the following engineers and contractor realized the final architectural design: Robert D. Dewell, Structural Engineer; Earl & Gropp, Mechanical and Electrical Engineers; R. K. McCullough Construction Co., General Contractors.

The Quarry Visitor Center was declared a National Historic Landmark in 2001.

In July 2006, the Quarry Visitor Center was closed due to structural problems that since 1958 had plagued the building because it was built on unstable clay. The decision was made to build a new facility elsewhere in the monument to house the visitor center and administrative functions, making it easier to resolve the structural problems of the quarry building while still retaining a portion of the historic Mission 66 era exhibit hall.

The visitor center was closed from 2006 to 2011 due to structural damage from unstable soils. The rotunda structure was demolished and replaced with a new structure of different design, while the quarry section was being stabilized and repaired.

It was announced in April 2009 that Dinosaur National Monument would receive $13.1 million to refurbish and reopen the gallery as part of the Obama administration's $750 billion stimulus plan. The Park Service successfully rebuilt the Quarry Exhibit Hall, supporting its weight on 70-foot steel micropile columns that extend to the bedrock below the unstable clay. The Dinosaur Quarry was reopened in Fall 2011.

== Fossils ==
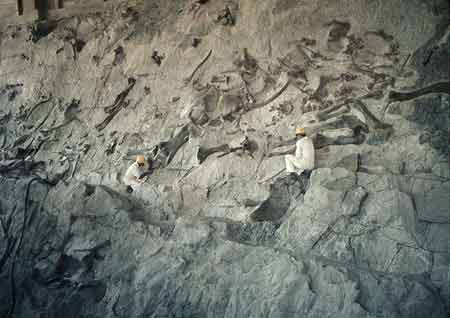
Workers inside the Dinosaur Quarry building

Park ranger tour video from 2022

Now enclosed by the Dinosaur Quarry building (Gilmore (1936), Foster (2003); Good (2004).

Planta
Coniferophyta
Mollusca
Unio sp.
Vetulonia sp.
Reptilia
Testudines

Glyptops plicatus
Dinochelys whitei

Rhynchocephalia

Opisthias rarus

Pseudosuchia

Goniopholis sp.
Hoplosuchus kayi (h)

Dinosauria
Saurischia

Theropoda

Ceratosaurus sp.
Torvosaurus sp.
Allosaurus fragilis

Sauropoda

Apatosaurus louisae (h)
Barosaurus lentus
Camarasaurus lentus
Diplodocus hallorum
Athenar bermani (h)

Ornithischia

Stegosauria

Stegosaurus ungulatus

Ornithopoda

Uteodon aphanoecetes (h)
Dryosaurus elderae (h)

(h) = holotype

== See also ==
- List of national monuments of the United States
  - List of National Historic Landmarks in Utah
- National Register of Historic Places listings in Uintah County, Utah
