= List of Utah State Routes deleted in 1969 =

A large number of minor routes in Utah, United States, were deleted by the State Legislature in 1969. This was by far the largest mass-decommissioning of highways in the history of Utah.

== State Route 19 (1927–1969) ==
The State Road Commission designated a state highway connecting Cedar City with Lund on August 2, 1912. The purpose was to connect Cedar City with the nearest railroad station, that of the Los Angeles and Salt Lake Railroad (Union Pacific Railroad) at Lund. A connecting road—now known as Gap Road—running west from the county seat at Parowan through Hieroglyphic Canyon (now Parowan Gap) to the Cedar City–Lund road was added to the state highway system on December 21, 1915. In 1919, the state legislature redefined the state highway system to include only a short list of roads and any federal aid projects. The road to Cedar City was kept since it was improved with federal aid, and the road to Parowan was dropped, but restored in 1921.

The Union Pacific Railroad began to promote a "circle tour" connecting Bryce Canyon National Park, Cedar Breaks National Monument, Zion National Park, Pipe Spring National Monument, and the North Rim of the Grand Canyon National Park in 1922. A new Cedar City Branch from Lund shortened the off-railroad distance, allowing the Utah Parks Company, a Union Pacific subsidiary that operated the tour buses and park lodging, to begin at Cedar City. Passenger trains on the branch usually operated only during the summer, however, while railroad-operated bus service on the Lund-Cedar City state highway ran year round.

The state legislature designated the roads connecting Lund to SR-1 at both Cedar City and Parowan as State Route 19 in 1927, and in 1931 the Parowan branch was split off, first as SR-128 and then in 1933 as State Route 127. A second connection between SR-19 and SR-1, following Midvalley Road past Enoch, became State Route 199 in 1935 but was given back to the county in 1943. SR-127 was removed from the state highway system in 1953. This route was deleted in 1969, with the route number immediately reused for the road for old US-6 through Green River.

== State Route 50 ==
State Route 50 was originally a branch of SR-122, but was split off as its own route in 1935, running from Wattis southeast to SR-122 east of Hiawatha (the number was not used before this because of US-50). This route was deleted in 1969, with the route number immediately reused for the road between Roy and Ogden (Riverdale Road), which was subsequently renumbered to SR-26 as part of the 1977 Utah state route renumbering in order to avoid confusion with US-50.

== State Route 53 ==
State Route 53 connected SR-8 (now US-6/US-191) at Wellington with SR-6 (now US-40) west of Myton via Ninemile Canyon Road. The road was designated on January 10, 1916 as a branch of SR-8, and was renumbered as SR-53 in 1931. In 1941, State Route 207, connecting Price to the Carbon County Regional Airport, was created. In 1945, SR-53 was rerouted to end in Price, replacing SR-207. In 1953, SR-53 was rerouted back to its old route which ended in Wellington. The highway was cancelled in 1969; the number was immediately reused to replace part of SR-37 in Ogden after its 1969 deletion.

== State Route 54 ==
State Route 54 was created as a renumbering of a branch of SR-12 to Tropic in 1931. That same year, a new State Route 120 was created, continuing the road from Tropic to Henrieville, and in 1935 it became part of SR-54. Another road was also added to the state highway system in 1914, connecting SR-22 at Widtsoe with Escalante, and it was numbered State Route 23 in 1927. An extension took SR-23 northeast to Boulder in 1941, and in 1947 SR-54 absorbed SR-23, with the Widtsoe-Escalante road dropped in favor of Henrieville-Escalante. State Route 117, running southeast from SR-24 near Teasdale to Grover, became a state highway in 1931, and was extended south to Boulder in 1957, becoming part of SR-54 in 1966. In 1969, the section to the north limit of Boulder (at the Dixie National Forest boundary) became part of SR-12, and the rest was dropped. The number was reused in 1971 for a road from I-15 to Mona. In 1985, SR-12 was extended back north from Boulder to SR-24, using a different route than old SR-117 north of Grover.

== State Route 55 ==
State Route 55 connected Cedar Breaks Junction on SR-14 to the south boundary of Cedar Breaks National Monument, a distance of about 2.5 miles (4.0 km). This route was designated on June 17, 1927 as part of SR-14, and split in 1931. It was withdrawn as a state route in 1969 and re-designated as part of SR-143. Later, in 1985, this route was split off from SR-143 and designated as a distinct highway, SR-148 (previous SR-148 was also removed in 1969), while SR-143 was extended to run along the rest of Panguitch Lake Road, north and east of Cedar Breaks until US-89 in Panguitch. SR-148 now follows the same route of former SR-55. The SR-55 route number was reused in 1975 as a business loop for US-6 in Price.

== State Route 58 ==
State Route 58 was transferred from State Route 1 (US-91) on September 27, 1965, consisting of the old road through Kanarraville, between the present exits 42 and 51 of I-15. It was deleted in 1969 and immediately reassigned to old SR-2 (US-40) through Wendover.

== State Route 63A ==
State Route 63A ran from SR-63 (modern US-50) in Scipio to SR-1/I-15. This was created in 1953. but was deleted in 1969.

== State Route 64 ==
State Route 64 - River Road from the Arizona state line north to SR-1 (US-91) in St. George - was added to the state highway system on May 12, 1931. It initially ran through St. George via 700 South, 700 East, 300 South, and 200 East, but was moved to use 700 East all the way to SR-1 (100 North) on January 25, 1963. After its deletion in 1969, the number was not reassigned until 1975, when it was used on what had been a spur of SR-26 through Holden.

== State Route 67 ==
State Route 67 served Dixie College in St. George connecting US-91 (SR-91, now SR-34) to the college. It was created in 1935 as SR-191, renumbered as SR-181A in 1945, and as SR-67 in 1962. As part of the renumbering of highways serving state institutions, it was renumbered as SR-281 in 1969. The 67 route number was reused in 1975 from US-6 to SR-36 in Tintic Junction. This was eliminated in 1991 and transferred to SR-36. Old SR-36 was removed from the state highway system. The 67 route number was reused in 2008 for the newly built Legacy Parkway.

== State Route 76 ==
The road from Parowan northeast through Paragonah and southwest through Summit was added to the state highway system in 1910, and in the 1920s it became part of SR-1 and US-91. In 1968, with the construction of I-15 in the area imminent, SR-1 was moved to the proposed bypass, and the old route of SR-1 became State Route 38 (I-15 near Summit to Center Street in Parowan), SR-143 (Center Street to near 500 North in Parowan, and then continuing to I-15), and State Route 76 (near 500 North in Parowan to I-15 near Paragonah). However, the state legislature did not concur with the latter, and the old road through Paragonah was maintained only until I-15 was completed. Construction of I-15 was finished by 1975, and included a second Parowan interchange that had not been in the 1968 plans. SR-143 was rerouted to turn south on SR-38 (old SR-1) in Parowan and west on 200 South to the new interchange, and the remainder of SR-38 was removed from the state highway system. (The 1968 extension of SR-143 was redesignated SR-274.) The road from Parowan through Paragonah to I-15 (former State Route 76) was restored to the state highway system in 1978 as SR-271.

The route number was reused in 1977 for former SR-10 between SR-72 and I-70 at Fremont Junction in Sevier County.

== State Route 78 ==
State Route 78 ran from SR-8 in Orem east to SR-7 at Edgemont along 800 South. It was added as a state highway on May 14, 1935, and extended west to SR-114 at Vineyard until 1953. The number was not reused until the 1977 renumbering, for former SR-163.

== State Route 86 ==
State Route 86 ran from SR-6 in Bridgeland north via Upalco and Altamont to Altonah. It was added as a state highway on May 14, 1935. In 1964, the portion from Upalco to Altamont was transferred to SR-87, and the portion from Altamont to Altonah was transferred to former SR-221, leaving SR-86 with only about 10 miles of road. This short remainder was deleted in 1969, and the number was reused in 1975 to designate a highway that currently runs from Henefer to I-84.

== State Route 90 ==
State Route 90 was the second state route in Utah to be numbered 90. Established in 1947, it ran from US-191 west on 25800 North to Portage, a distance of approximately 2.3 miles. This was created in exchange for deleting the first SR-90, which went from SR-1 near the north line of Iron County southeast to SR-20, and was moved north to end at SR-11 rather than SR-20 in 1943 (this is now Freemont Road and Dog Valley Road). The second SR-90 was deleted in 1969. The number was reused in 1975, when it was used to renumber the spur of SR-85 in Brigham City, itself a bypassed routing of US-91.

== State Route 91 ==
State Route 91 was established May 14, 1935, and ran from Fairview at SR-32 (now US-89) northerly 7.5 miles (12.1 km) to Milburn. It was deleted in 1969 and the route number was reused in 1977 as the legislative designation for US-91. The road is now known as the Fairview Milburn Highway.

== State Route 92 ==
State Route 92 (SR-92) was established 1953 and ran from SR-155 north of Cleveland to Elmo along Elmo Road. The number was not reused until the 1977 renumbering, for former SR-80.

The original SR-92 had been established May 14, 1935, and ran from Elmo to SR-10 (north-northwest of Elmo), but was extended south to SR-155 in Cleveland in 1943. (That entire route ran along what is now known as Cleveland Road.) The original SR-92 was decommissioned in 1947, but the southern extension of the original route was used as the routing for the second version of SR-92 that was established in 1953.

== State Route 94 ==
State Route 94 was established May 14, 1935 and ran from Thompson north to Sego. The number was reused immediately on the continuation of this road from I-70 to Thompson.

== State Route 98 ==
State Route 98 was established May 14, 1935 and ran from Beryl Junction (SR-56 at SR-18 between Newcastle and Modena) north to Beryl in Iron County. The original highway was approximately 12 miles (19 km) long and is now known as the Beryl Highway. It was deleted from the state highway system in 1969, and SR-98 was immediately reused for an arterial highway in Weber County. in 2000, this highway was consolidated with SR-97 and deleted.

== State Route 99 ==
State Route 99 was designated in the 1930s as a spur from US-6 to Sugarville, a distance of approximately 11 miles. It began at 700 West and Main Street in Delta, heading west to 1000 West and turning north. It then curved west into 1500 North before turning north on 3000 West. The route passed through Sutherland before turning west on 7500 North, coming to its northern terminus at 4250 West in Sugarville. The route was decommissioned in 1969, and the number was immediately reused as the I-15 business loop through Fillmore.

== State Route 110 ==
State Route 110 was designated in 1931 from SR-1 (later SR-106) in Kaysville to West Kaysville. In 1941, it was extended east to SR-49 (US-89), and in 1969 it was all eliminated except for the piece that became SR-106. The number was immediately reused on a route from SR-127 to SR-37.

== State Route 120 ==
State Route 120 connected SR-18 at Enterprise west to the Nevada border. Originally, this route was added in 1941 as a branch of SR-18 from Enterprise west to Nevada, where SR 75 continued as a shortcut to Panaca, but was split off as SR-120 in 1945. Note that when SR-120 was split off, the previous SR-120 from SR-56 west of Cedar City southwest to Old Irontown was deleted. The route number was immediately reused to designate a new SR-120 which doubles as Interstate 70 Business (Richfield, Utah). This was partially restored as SR-219 (previous SR-219 was also removed in 1969).

== State Route 126 ==
A loop through Greenville was created as SR-127 in 1931 and renumbered State Route 126 in 1933, following a road from SR-21 south to Greenville and then heading west on that community's Main Street back to SR-21. The east–west portion was removed in 1953, and in 1969 the remainder was removed from the state highway system, and the number was not reused until the 1977 renumbering, for the original section of former SR-84.

== State Route 129 ==
State Route 129 was established June 26, 1933, heading south from SR-21 in Milford along Adams Street (which would normally be Main Street in the local grid) to a point on the Milford Flat, then east on 4500 South back to SR-21. It too ceased to be a state highway in 1969., and the number was not reused until 1983 for a route between I-15 in Riverside and SR-30 in Tremonton. This was deleted in 1989, and transferred to SR-30, as the old route became a northern extension of SR-69 (now SR-38 due to sign theft) and an eastern extension of SR-102. The number was reused in 2014 from US 89 along 700 N and N County Blvd to SR-92.

== State Route 133 ==
State Route 133 was established on June 26, 1933 as the highway from SR-2 in Coalville east via Pine View to the Wyoming state line. This was deleted in 1969, and the number was immediately reused along old US-91 through Kanosh.

== State Route 134 ==
State Route 134 was established on May 9, 1939 and ran from SR-35 about six miles north of Duchesne northward to Mountain Home. On May 13, 1941, it was extended north to the Uintah and Ouray Indian Reservation, with a spur to Altamont. The spur to Altamont was renumbered SR-221. In 1964, the southern portion from SR-35 to about 3 miles south of Mountain Home (at the intersection with former SR-221) was transferred to SR-87. The remainder was deleted in 1969, and the number was reused in 1977 when former SR-40 was renumbered to make room for US-40 in the 1977 renumbering.

== State Route 135 ==
State Route 135 was established on June 26, 1933 as the highway from Delta via Oak City to the boundary of Fishlake National Forest in Millard County. In 1953, the portion between Delta and Oak City was removed from the route and transferred to SR-125. In 1969, the remainder of the route was deleted and the route numbered was reassigned to Sevier County as the road from SR-119 near Richfield northeasterly to SR-24 near Sigurd. This route was subsequently deleted in 1992 and reassigned as part of SR-118. The route numbered was reassigned again in 2016 from SR-129 southwest along Pleasant Grove Boulevard to 2800 West.

== State Route 136 ==
State Route 136 was established on June 26, 1933 as the road from Kanab west to Johnson Canyon, then north to Alton. It then extended west to SR-11 (now known as US-89) at Alton Junction in 1941 (replacing half of the SR-11 loop), essentially forming an eastern loop off then SR-11. On May 14, 1957, the 8.1 miles (13.0 km) from Kanab to Johnson Canyon was split off as part of a new route, SR-259 (built to connect Kanab with then under construction Glen Canyon Dam and later became part of the mainline of US-89 and deleted in 1977). SR-136 was deleted in 1969 and reused in 1985 for a short connector between US-50 and US-6 just west of the city of Delta.

== State Route 140 ==
State Route 140 was established on June 26, 1933 as the road from SR-27 (now US-6) near Hinckley south to Deseret and east via Oasis to SR-26 (now US-50) at Harding. In 1969, SR-140 was deleted, but the section from US-6 to Deseret became part of SR-257. The number was not reused until 1984, when it was assigned to a road in Bluffdale.

== State Route 141 ==
State Route 141 was established on June 26, 1933 as the road from Hatton east to what was then Route 1 (now SR-133), a distance of about 1.6 miles (2.6 km). The route was deleted in 1969 and the route number was immediately reused for current-day SR-141.

== State Route 144 ==
State Route 144 was established on June 26, 1933 and ran from SR-1 (US-91, now I-15) near the Washington/Iron county line westward via New Harmony to the Dixie National Forest boundary. The route underwent numerous minor changes until being withdrawn from the state highway system in 1969. The route number was reused in 1978, when the state legislature designated Utah State Route 144 as the road from SR-92 in American Fork Canyon north to Tibble Fork Reservoir.

== State Route 145 ==
State Route 145 was established on June 26, 1933 from SR-16 in Laketown via Meadowville and Round Valley to SR-16. This was deleted in 1969. The route number was reused in 1978, when the state legislature designated SR-145 as the road from SR-68 in Saratoga east to US-89 in American Fork.

== State Route 148 ==
State Route 148 originally connected Lynndyl and Leamington to SR-132. This original alignment was swapped with SR-132 in 1945 to create the current-day alignment of SR-132, with SR-148 now connecting that highway to SR-26 (US-50, now US-6) near Jericho. This route was deleted in 1969. The route number was reused in 1985 when SR-143 was realigned, with the modern-day SR-148 following the route of former SR-55.

== State Route 154 ==
State Route 154 was created in 1933 from SR-41 to SR-69 via Garland Road. In 1969, the section from FAS-521 east to SR-69 (now SR-38) was redesignated as an extension of SR-84, while the remainder of the route was deleted; the route number was not reused until 1988 for the Bangerfer Highway.

== State Route 158 ==
State Route 158 was established in 1933 as the road connecting Croydon with what is now Interstate 84 at Devil's Slide. The route remained unchanged until 1969, when it was deleted from the state highway system. The route number was not reused until 1990, when the current route was established, running from Eden Junction to the parking lot at Powder Mountain Ski Resort.

== State Route 159 ==
State Route 159, now known as "Dividend Road", was originally part of SR-26, where it went through the town of Dividend (now a ghost town) just east of Eureka. Dividend was bypassed by a new route through Homansville Canyon in about 1931, and the old route (Dividend Road) initially became a branch of SR-26. It was renumbered State Route 159 in 1945. The former SR-159 from SR-4 south and east to SR-111 at Riverton was transferred to an extension of SR-111. and deleted from the state highway system in 1969.

== State Route 165 ==
State Route 165 was established in 1935 from the Wyoming state line south 5 miles in Daggett County. This route was established when the original route of SR-165 from SR-44 to Flaming Gorge, which was established in 1933, was cancelled in exchange for designating this road. This was deleted in 1969, and the route number was immediately reused as the road from US-91 in Logan to Paradise.

== State Route 166 ==
State Route 166 was established in 1933 from SR-43 west of Antelope Canal south to the forest boundary. This was deleted in 1969, and the route number was immediately reused as the road from SR-39 at Huntsville north and east around Pineview Reservoir to SR-162 in Eden. This was deleted in 1990, along with SR-162 and SR-169, in exchange for creating the new SR-158 to the parking lot at Powder Mountain.

== State Route 167 ==
State Route 167 was originally split off as the Mapleton end of State Route 147 in 1935. It was consolidated back into State Route 147 in 1969, with the section from State Route 147 to Mapleton cancelled (that section is now Main Street). The route number went empty until 1985, when it was used to designate Trappers Loop Road as a state highway.

== State Route 170 ==
State Route 170 originally connected Richmond at SR-1 (now US-91) west via Trenton to Clarkston at SR-142 in Cache County. In 1969, the route was absorbed into SR-142 and the route was deleted from the state highway system. The route number was briefly reused from 1992 to 1993 for a cutoff between US-50 and SR-24 near Aurora, but was renamed soon after to SR-260 to avoid confusion from having SR-170 and I-70 in such close proximity.

== State Route 172 ==
State Route 172, a road from SR-65 to Pinecrest, was created in 1935 and existed until 1969. The route number went empty until 1985, when it was used to designate 5600 West south of I-80 in Salt Lake City as a state highway.

== State Route 175 ==
Utah State Route 175 was created in 1933 from SR-106 (now US-89) in Ogden via 36th Street, Grant Avenue and 21st Street back to SR-106. It was deleted in 1969 and was not reused as a route number until 2008, for 11400 South in Salt Lake County.

== State Route 176 ==
Utah State Route 176 was a state highway created in 1933 entirely within the cities of Salt Lake City and South Salt Lake in Salt Lake County, Utah, United States. It mainly functioned as an alternate route for US-89, US-91, and I-15 traffic that provided access to industrial areas of the two cities and avoided urban cross-traffic in Downtown Salt Lake City. The original route followed 900 South west from State Street (Salt Lake County) (concurrent US-89 and US-91) to 300 West and then traveled north on 300 West to meet US-89 and US-91 again at South Temple (or, later, at North Temple). The route was subsequently changed to follow 300 West only: it followed 300 West all the way from 3300 South (SR-171) to North Temple (traffic from either I-15 or State Street could reach the southern end along short stretches of SR-171). The route number was not reused until 2017, for the proposed Vineyard Connector Road.

== State Route 178 ==
Utah State Route 178 was created in 1935 from SR-36 in Tooele east to the International Smelter. This was deleted in 1969, and the route number was not reused until 2000 along 800 south in Payson.

== State Route 179 ==
State Route 179 was a state highway that connected SR-36 to Bauer. The route began at a point south of Tooele and north of Stockton, running south and southwest on Bauer Road. The route was deleted in 1969. The number was not reused until 2017, when it was assigned to the Tooele Midvalley Highway.

== State Route 181A ==
State Route 181A was created in 1962 as three road segments on the campus of the University of Utah. These roads were originally added to SR-186 in 1935. In 1969, these roads were renumbered as SR-282.

== State Route 182 ==
State Route 182 was created in 1935, running along 20th Street from SR-1 (US-89) east to the former campus of the Utah Schools for the Deaf and the Blind at Monroe Boulevard. In 1962 it was extended east to Harrison Boulevard. SR-183A was created in 1939 and numbered in 1945, running east on 7th Street from SR-1 to what was then the Utah State Tuberculosis Sanatorium on the east side of Harrison Boulevard. This route was deleted in 1963, but after the sanatorium was replaced with a new campus for the Schools for the Deaf and Blind, the route was readded in 1968 as part of SR-182. In 1969, SR-182 was split and renumbered, with the original route (minus the segment on 20th street) becoming SR-285 and the newer readdition as SR-291. The route number has not been reused yet.

=== State Route 182A ===
State Route 182A was created in 1939 and numbered in 1945. It served the College of Eastern Utah, running from SR-55 (100 North) along 300 East, and then looping around the college for a total distance of about 1.33 miles (2.14 km). It was renumbered as SR-283 in 1969, which was deleted in 2001.

== State Route 183 ==
State Route 183 was created in 1935 to serve the Ogden-Weber Applied Technology College near the south end of SR-235 (Washington Boulevard). This route was renumbered in 1969 as SR-286. The route number has not been reused yet.

== State Route 184A ==
State Route 184A was created in 1940 as a collection of roads on the campus of Weber State University. The route was renumbered as SR-284 in 1969.

== State Route 185 ==
State Route 185 was created in 1935 to serve the Utah State Developmental Center in American Fork. It was extended east to SR-146 (now Canyon Road) in 1941. In 1969, the portion on school grounds was renumbered SR-296 while the rest was deleted.

== State Route 187 ==
State Route 187 was created in 1935 to serve the old Sugar House Prison. In 1941, when the prison was moved to the new Utah State Prison facility in Draper, the route followed it. Spanning just under 0.4 miles (0.64 km), a marker identifying the route as "U-187, Utah's Shortest Designated Highway" was installed by the state highway department on December 29, 1955. This route was renumbered as SR-287 in 1969.

== State Route 188 ==
State Route 188 was created in 1935 to serve Utah State University. It was renumbered to SR-288 in 1969, and deleted in 2007.

== State Route 189 ==
State Route 189 was a three-quarters loop around Snow College in Ephraim, following 100 North, 400 East, and Center Street from US-89 (Main Street) back to US-89, for a distance of 1.165 miles (1.875 km). The route was created in 1935, changed from a spur to a loop in 1965, and renumbered as Utah State Route 290 in 1969.

== State Route 190 ==
State Route 190 was a 1.920-mile (3.090 km) rectangular route around Southern Utah University in Cedar City. It followed Center Street from the intersection of SR-130 (Main Street) and SR-14 west to 1150 West, south to 200 South, east to 300 West, and back north to Center Street. It was created in 1935, and renumbered to SR-289 in 1969. The 190 route number was reused in 1987 for what is now the Big Cottonwood Canyon Scenic Byway.

== State Route 194 ==
State Route 194 was established in 1947 from US-89 in Richfield westward via 300 S and southward via 400 W to US-89, as the old State Route 194 (established in 1935) went from North Salt Lake City on SR-1 northeasterly via Orchard Drive to Val Verda, thence northerly via 400 East through Centerville to Chase Lane, thence west to SR-1 and was deleted that year. This route was removed from the state highway system in 1969. The route number has not been reused yet.

This route number will be repurposed in 2019 for the east–west segment of the Mountain View Corridor freeway project in Utah County. The north–south sections will retain State Route 85, which the east–west segment has/had been previously assigned.

== State Route 196 ==
State Route 196 ran from Peoa at former SR-35 (now SR-32), southwest through Browns Canyon to former SR-6 (now US-40) in Summit County, a distance of roughly 7 miles (11 km). It was originally designated a state route in 1931 as State Route 125, renumbered as State Route 124 in 1933, and again renumbered as State Route 196 in 1935. The route was deleted from the state highway system in 1969, and is now known simply as Browns Canyon Road. The route number was not reused until 1998, when the current SR-196 was added to the system.

== State Route 198 ==
A connection from the Deseret Chemical Depot north to SR-73 near its west end, constructed with federal aid in 1942, was designated as State Route 198 in 1945. was numbered State Route 198. It was deleted in 1969. The route number was not reused until 1995, when SR-198 was reused for old US 6 through Santaquin.

== State Route 199 ==
State Route 199 was designated in 1943 from SR-86 east to Bluebell. It extended east to SR-121 in 1948, but that extension was deleted in 1953, and it was instead rerouted south to SR-86 near Upalco. In 1964, the route it ended at became SR-87. This was deleted in 1969, and the route number was immediately reused for the route from SR-36 south of Stockton to Dugway.

== State Route 205 ==
State Route 205 ran from SR-104 (Wilson Lane) to Wall Avenue in Ogden. It was designated in 1965 for a new road to be constructed as part of the 1968 fiscal year urban program. In 1969, the route was deleted, and the roadway was transferred to SR-104. The route number has not been reused yet. The old route of SR-104 east of SR-205 was removed from the state highway system, and is now Wilson Lane and Exchange Road.

== State Route 206 ==
State Route 206 was established in 1939 from Clearfield southward 4.5-mile (7.2 km) to SR-109. In 1947, part of the road was closed off because the Naval Supply Depot was created, so that SR-206 went from SR-109 northward to the Naval Supply Depot entrance only. This route was removed from the state highway system in 1969, and the route number has not been reused yet.

== State Route 209 ==
State Route 209 was created in 1941, heading north from SR-88 near Leota to US-40 east of Fort Duchesne. In 1969, SR-88 was realigned to follow SR-209, with the old alignment to Fort Duchesne becoming a county road. The route number was immediately reused from US-89 east along 9400 South in Salt Lake City.

== State Route 211 ==
State Route 211 was designated on its current route in 1968. This route was removed from the state highway system in 1969, but was restored in 1971.

== State Route 213 ==
State Route 213 was designated in 1941 from SR-35 in Oakley eastward 12-mile (19 km) along the Weber River to the Pines. This route was removed from the state highway system in 1969, and the route number has not been reused yet.

== State Route 215 ==
State Route 215 was designated in 1968 as the road from SR-26 6 miles southwest of Lynndyl northwest to the Topaz Mountains. This was deleted in 1969 and the route number was reused in 1977 as the legislative designation for I-215. The eastern part of this route was restored as SR-174.

== State Route 216 ==
State Route 216 was designated in 1941 from SR-53 in Myton southeast 7-mile (11 km) via Sand Wash Road to Castle Peak Gilsonite mines. This route, along with SR-53, was removed from the state highway system in 1969, and the route number has not been reused yet.

== State Route 217 ==
State Route 217 was designated in 1941 to begin at US-91 north of Logan and head west on 1800 North to Greenville, north on 600 West, and west on Airport Road to Benson. It was modified in 1945 to use Airport Road directly from US-91, and was removed from the state highway system in 1969. The route number has not been reused yet.

== State Route 219 ==
State Route 219 was designated as running from the junction with the roads to Milton and Richville (possibly now the intersection of Young St and Morgan Valley Dr) east into Morgan to Morgan High School, thence north across Weber River to the post office on the Main Street of Morgan. It was added as a state highway on May 13, 1941, and withdrawn in 1969. The route number was not reused until 1984 when 1.3 miles of Main Street in Enterprise was added to the state highway system (part of SR-120 before 1969) in exchange for removing former Utah State Route 307 in Gunlock State Park.

== State Route 221 ==
State Route 221 ran from former SR-134 south of Mountain Home easterly via Boneta to former SR-86 at Altamont. The original alignment was designated a state route on May 13, 1941. In 1964, SR-87 was significantly expanded, and the entirety of this original route was transferred to SR-87, with SR-221 being realigned to go from Altamont, north to Altonah. The route was deleted in 1969, and the route number has not been reused yet.

== State Route 222 ==
State Route 222 ran from US-189 (then numbered SR-7) near Deer Creek Reservoir southeast to the town of Wallsburg, covering a little over 3 miles (4.8 km). It was designated a state route on May 13, 1941 and withdrawn in 1969. The route number was reused in 2004 to re-designate a portion of SR-224 as SR-222 in Midway.

== State Route 223 ==
State Route 223 ran from former SR-6 west to Keetley and southeast to SR-6. In 1953, it was rerouted to go southwest and southeast rather than southeast from Keetley. It was deleted in 1969, and the road was inundated by Jordanelle Reservoir in 1987 (when US 40 and US 189 were rerouted). The route number was not reused until 2001, from SR-224 along Olympic Parkway and Bear Hollow Drive. This was a temporary route, decommissioned on September 30, 2002. The route number has not been used since.

== State Route 228 ==
The state legislature designated State Route 228 in 1941, beginning at SR-147 west of Spanish Fork and heading northwest on Palmyra Drive via Palmyra and south on 3200 West to SR-115 at Benjamin.It was deleted in 1969, but the north–south piece became part of an extension of SR-77. The number was not reused until 1981, one a route along old US-91 through Leeds.

== State Route 229 ==
State Route 229 was defined in 1941, connecting SR-210 near Alta to SR-152 (now SR-190) near Brighton along a proposed roadway. It was deleted in 1969 and transferred to SR-210, but in 1994, this section was cancelled as it was never constructed. The route number has not been reused yet.

== State Route 230 ==
State Route 230 was created in 1941 from SR-103 (now SR-203) near 42nd Street northwest to 36th Street, following 36th Street to SR-204, following SR-204 to 33rd Street, west to SR-38 (now SR-79), then southwest and west along the airport boundary to SR-38 (now SR-126) in Ogden. In 1943, SR-30 was realigned, so that it went from 36th Street, following 36th Street to SR-1, with another section from SR-38 southwest and west along the airport boundary to SR-38. In 1945, the section from SR-38 southwest and west along the airport boundary to SR-38 was renumbered as SR-231 (which was decommissioned in 1953), leaving only the section from SR-103 to SR-1. It was decommissioned in 1969, and the route number has not been reused yet.

== State Route 236 ==
State Route 236 was originally the southern branch of SR-122, running from Hiawatha to SR-10 north of Huntington, but was split off as its own route in 1945. The route was deleted in 1969. The route number has not been reused yet.

== State Route 239 ==
State Route 239 was designated in 1947 from SR-65 in Parley's Canyon south to SR-4. It was renumbered from part of SR-65, which was rerouted back to its pre-1945 route. In 1969, this route was transferred back to SR-65, as the old route of SR-65, which was removed in 1945 and restored in 1947, was removed again, putting SR-65 back on its 1945 route. The route number was not reused until 1983 on a new highway from SR-237 via 1400 North to US-91 in exchange for deleting the section of SR-237 via 600 East and 1000 North. This route, along with SR-237, SR-238, and SR-288, were eliminated in 2007 as part of the swap to create new SR-252 (a number of which the previous route was also removed in 1969).

== State Route 240 ==
State Route 240 was designated in 1966 from SR-140 west on 2500 South and north on Main Street to SR 27. This was dropped from the state highway system in 1969, and SR-257 replaced the section of SR-140 that SR-240 ended at (the rest of SR-140 was also dropped from the state highway system). The number was reused in 1983 as a road from I-15 to SR-69 (which was later redesignated as SR-38) in Honeyville.

== State Route 241 ==
State Route 241 was a loop from SR-35 along Bench Creek Road east of Woodland. It was created in 1947 and existed until 1969. The number was immediately reused on a route from SR-114 to I-15.

== State Route 242 ==
State Route 242 was a road designated in 1949 from SR-101 in Hyrum east to the Hardware Ranch. This became part of rerouted SR-101. The old route of SR-101 became part of SR-165. he route number has not been reused yet.

== State Route 245 ==
State Route 245 was a road designated in 1953 from Vernal west to the bridge over the Highline Canal west of Maeser as a renumbering of part of SR-121, which had the section west of there removed from the state highway system. In 1969, the road was transferred back to SR-121, as the section of SR-121 deleted in 1953 was restored. The route number has not been reused yet.

== State Route 246 ==
State Route 246 was a road from US 40 west of Gusher northward to Tridell. The route was deleted in 1969. The route number has not been reused yet.

== State Route 249 ==
In 1953, Redwood Road north of 2300 North became State Route 249, which turned east at 500 South in Davis County to end at US-89/US-91 (500 West) in Bountiful.

To provide for route continuity on a truck bypass route of Salt Lake City, SR-68 and SR-249 were swapped in 1960, making SR-249 a short connection on 2300 North. SR-249 was extended west along a proposed roadway to 2200 West and 2200 North in 1961, "in order to provide an adequate road from the north to the Salt Lake City municipal airport", but in 1969 the entire route was removed from the state highway system. The route number has not been reused yet.

== State Route 250 ==
State Route 250 was created in 1953 as a connection from SR-24 between Loa and Lyman north to the 90° turn in SR-72, but was given back to the county in 1969. The route number has not been reused yet.

== State Route 251 ==
State Route 251 was created in 1953 as a loop off US-91 through Mantua. It passed through the town on the streets of 100 South and Main Street. The route was deleted in 1969, and the route number has not been reused yet.

== State Route 252 ==
After a bypass of Myton was built, the old route of US-40 along Main and Sixth Streets became State Route 252 in 1953. It was given to the city in 1969. The number was reused in 2007 on a bypass in Logan.

== State Route 253 ==
State Route 253 was established in 1953 from the junction of SR-56 west of Cedar City to Desert Mound. and also created State Route 254 as a branch to Iron Springs. It was deleted in 1969, and the route number has not been reused yet.

== State Route 254 ==
State Route 254 was established in 1953 from the junction of SR-253 to Iron Springs. It was deleted in 1969, and the route number has not been reused yet.

== State Route 255 ==
State Route 255 was established in 1953. It ran from US-89 in North Salt Lake north on Orchard Drive through Bountiful and into Centerville, where it turned west on Chase Lane (1000 North) to Main Street (SR-106). The route was decommissioned in 1969, and the route number has not been reused yet.

== State Route 256 ==
The state legislature designated State Route 256 in 1955, running south from SR-63 (now US-50) west of Salina through Aurora to SR-11 (US-89, now SR-24). The route was deleted in 1969, and the number was immediately reused for old US-89 through Redmond. The route deleted in 1969 was restored as SR-260 in 1992.

== State Route 263 ==
State Route 263 was established in 1959 from SR-119 in Glenwood south on Main Street and east on Center Street to 200 East. It was deleted 1969, and the number was immediately reused for a route from SR-95 to the recreation area near Halls Crossing. This route was deleted in 1985 when ferry service between Bullfrog Basin and Halls Crossing began, as it became part of SR-276.

== State Route 264 ==
State Route 264 was established in 1961 from the Red Wash Oil Field north to US 40 east of Jensen and the Green River. This was deleted in 1969, and the route number was not reused until 1985 on a route from SR-31 in Fairview to SR-96.

== State Route 267 ==
State Route 267 was established in 1966 from I-80 east to SR-176 (now 300 West). This became part of SR-186 in 1969, but this section was turned back in 2007. The route number has not been reused yet.
