= Uintah and Ouray Indian Reservation =

Native American reservation in Utah, United States

Coordinates: 40°27′28″N 110°10′53″W

- Indian Reservation
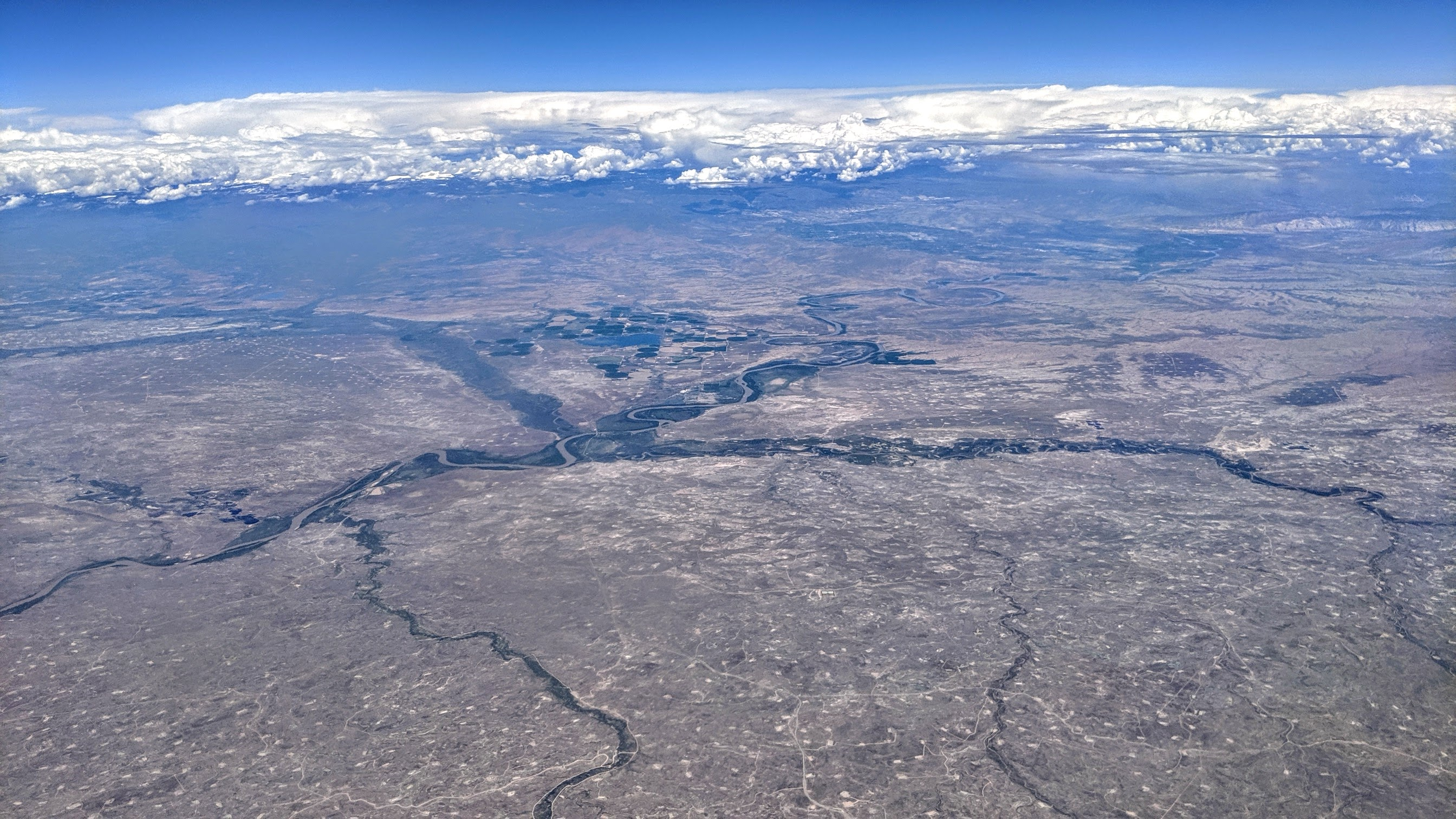
- Aerial view of the reservation centered on Ouray

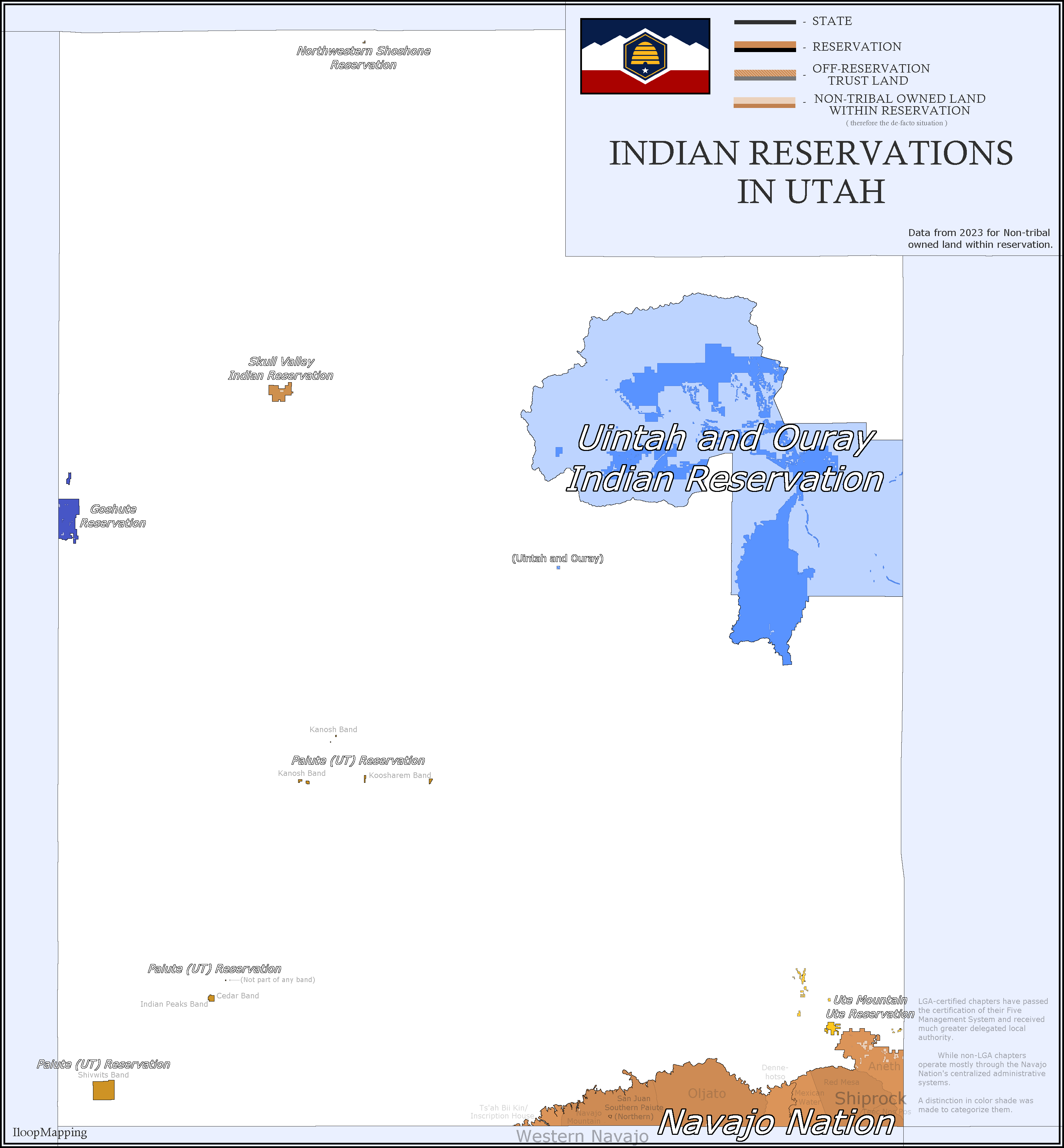
- Boundary of Uintah and Ouray Indian Reservation, with shown tribal land ownership.
- Tribe: Ute Tribe
- Country: United States
- State: Utah
- Established: 1886
- Capital: Fort Duchesne

Area
  - Total: 17,677.0 km^{2} (6,825.13 sq mi)

Population (2020)
  - Total: 25,192
- Time zone: MST/MDT
- GDP: $2.96 Billion

The Uintah and Ouray Indian Reservation (/juːˈɪntə/, /ˈjʊəreɪ/) is located in northeastern Utah, United States. It is the homeland of the Ute Indian Tribe (Ute dialect: Núuchi-u), and is the largest of three Indian reservations inhabited by members of the Ute Tribe of Native Americans.

== Description ==
The reservation lies in parts of seven counties; in descending order of land area they are: Uintah, Duchesne, Wasatch, Grand, Carbon, Utah, and Emery counties, with the latter two counties containing only very small portions of tribal land near Strawberry Reservoir and the Green River respectively. The total land area is 6,769.173 square miles (17,532.08 km^{2}) with control of the lands split between Ute Indian Allottees, the Ute Indian Tribe, and the Ute Distribution Corporation.

The tribe owns lands that total approximately 1.2 million acres (4,855 km^{2}) of surface land and 400,000 acres (1,600 km^{2}) of mineral-owned land within the 4 million acres (16,185 km^{2}) reservation area. Other parts of the reservation are owned by non-Ute, as the tribe lost control of much of the land during the allotment process.

As of the 2000 census, a population of 19,182 persons was recorded as living on the reservation. This is the second-largest Indian reservation in land area in the United States, second to the Navajo Nation, but control of the land is split among multiple authorities. Tribal headquarters are in Fort Duchesne, located in Uintah County, Utah. The largest community within the reservation boundaries is the city of Roosevelt. Most residents within the reservation boundaries are not Native Americans.

== Land ownership and the allotment process ==
The Uintah Valley Reservation was created on October 3, 1861 by an executive order of President Abraham Lincoln. The Uncompahgre Reservation (commonly called the Ouray Reservation) was created on January 5, 1882 by an executive order of President Chester A. Arthur. The two reservations were maintained by separate agencies until 1886, when the Bureau of Indian Affairs merged the administration into the Uintah and Ouray Agency at Fort Duchesne.

Today, only about one-quarter of the 4,000,000 acres (16,000 km^{2}) in the reservation area is tribal land. Beginning in the 1890s (and continuing for more than a decade), the U.S. Congress passed laws requiring small parcels of land in the reservation be allotted to individual Natives and any surplus land be opened to the public domain. In August 1905, after allotments had been granted to the Native peoples, the unallotted land in the reservation was opened to homesteading and mineral claims. By means of presidential proclamation, town-sites were created (such as Myton and Roosevelt) and land was taken and absorbed into the Uinta National Forest. The United States Reclamation Service, through the use of eminent domain, acquired the Strawberry Valley for construction of the Strawberry Reservoir.

Land within the reservation continued to be acquired by non-Natives until 1934, when the Indian Reorganization Act ended the process, and in 1945 any unclaimed lands were restored to tribal jurisdiction. The allotment process has thus resulted in a reservation with not only tribal land, but land owned both privately by non-Natives and publicly by a variety of government entities.

In March 1948, the area known as the Hill Creek Extension was added to the reservation.

== Legal jurisdiction issues ==
Because of the allotment process, land in the reservation is owned by a variety of private, public, and tribal entities. Law enforcement efforts in the area are complicated by this checkerboard of ownership which results in a variety of different legal jurisdictions.

The tribe has had longstanding issues with state and county authorities, who since the 1970s had prosecuted in state court Ute members from within the tribal lands at this reservation and its two other holdings. The tribe filed suit against the state in federal district court. In Ute Tribe v. Utah (10th Cir. 1985) (en banc), known as Ute III, the full U.S. Court of Appeals for the Tenth Circuit, sitting en banc, upheld the tribe's legal jurisdiction over its members within the reservations and affirmed its boundaries, rejecting the state and counties' claims that the area of jurisdiction had been reduced since the reservation was established in 1864. The U.S. Supreme Court declined to hear the case.

The state continued to prosecute Ute within the reservations in state court, in violation of the ruling in Ute III. The state Supreme Court ruled the reservation boundaries had been reduced, and the case was heard by the US Supreme Court, Hagen v. Utah, 510 U.S. 399, 421-22 (1994). It upheld the Utah Supreme Court in affirming that some congressional actions had diminished the boundaries of the Uintah Reservation, but that the two other reservations were not affected.

In an effort to reconcile the cases in light of the Supreme Court's ruling, the Tenth Circuit Court of Appeals reviewed Ute Tribe v. Utah in 1997.

So in a decision the parties call Ute V, this court elected to recall and modify Ute III's mandate. See Ute Indian Tribe v. Utah, 114 F.3d 1513, 1527-28 (10th Cir. 1997). Because Hagen addressed the Uintah Valley Reservation, Ute V deemed that particular portion of Ute tribal lands diminished — and diminished according to the terms Hagen dictated. So much relief was warranted, this court found, to "reconcile two inconsistent boundary determinations and to provide a uniform allocation of jurisdiction among separate sovereigns. Id. at 1523.

The state and counties continued to prosecute Ute from within the reservation for offenses in state courts. The Tenth Circuit Court of Appeals called the plaintiffs and defendants together again in 2015. The court rejected the counties' claim to be acting as an arm of the state and entitled to the same immunity. It strongly advised the state and counties to observe the settled nature of this case and to refrain from their tactics to challenge the boundaries of the reservation and jurisdiction of the tribe over its people in "Indian country."

== Communities ==
- Altamont
- Altonah
- Arcadia
- Avalon
- Ballard
- Bennett
- Bluebell
- Bonanza
- Boneta
- Bridgeland
- Cedarview
- Crescent
- Duchesne
- Fort Duchesne (tribal headquarters)
- Fruitland
- Gusher
- Hanna
- Hayden
- Ioka
- Lapoint
- Leeton
- Leota
- Monarch
- Mountain Home
- Mount Emmons
- Myton
- Neola
- Ouray
- Randlett
- Roosevelt
- Soldier Creek Estates
- Stockmore
- Strawberry
- Tabiona
- Talmage
- Tridell
- Upalco
- Utahn
- Whiterocks

== See also ==
- List of Indian reservations in the United States
- Ouray National Wildlife Refuge
- Southern Ute Indian Reservation
- Uinta Indian Irrigation Project
- Ute Mountain Ute Indian Reservation
