= Upalco, Utah =

Unincorporated community in the state of Utah, United States

- Unincorporated community
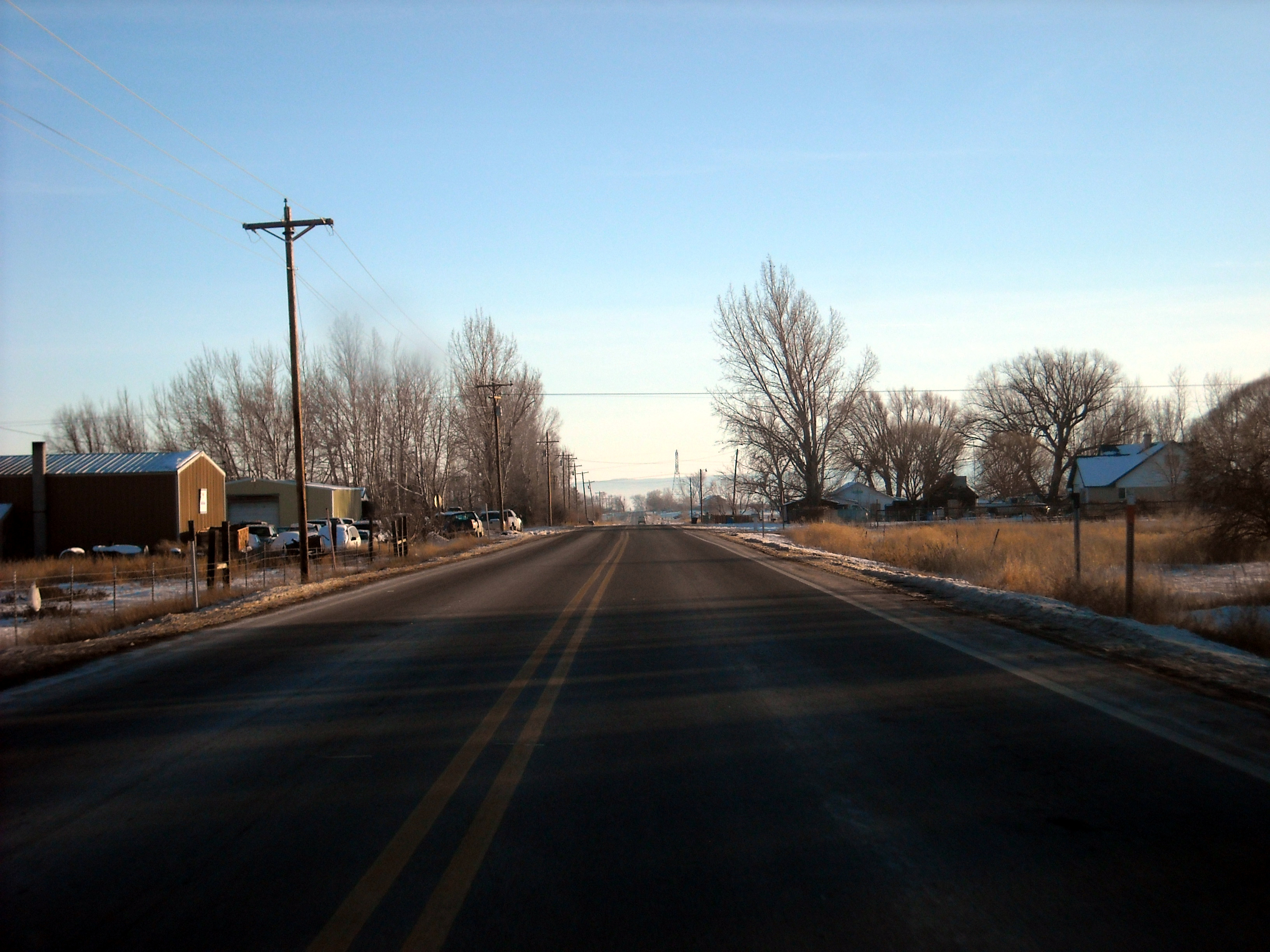
- Looking south along State Route 87 in Upalco, December 2008

- Location of Upalco within the State of Utah Location of Upalco within the United States
- Coordinates: 40°16′41″N 110°13′06″W
- Country: United States
- State: Utah
- County: Duchesne
- Elevation: 5,755 ft (1,754 m)
- Time zone: UTC-7 (Mountain (MST))
  - Summer (DST): UTC-6 (MDT)
- ZIP codes: 84002
- Area code: 435
- GNIS feature ID: 1433790

Upalco is an unincorporated community in eastern Duchesne County, Utah, United States.

== Description ==
The community is located in the Uinta Basin on the Uintah and Ouray Indian Reservation, approximately 7.5 miles (12.1 km) southeast of the town of Altamont and has an elevation of 5,755 feet (1,754 m). Upalco uses the same ZIP code (84007) that is assigned to Bluebell, a census-designated place located about 5.5 miles (8.9 km) to the north.

Upalco was originally named Lake Fork, after the nearby Lake Fork River, which flows southerly to the west of the community. The name Upalco came from the initial letters of Utah Power and Light Company, which provided funding for an associated, but unidentified project. The Big Sand Wash Reservoir is located about one mile (1.6 km) north of Upalco. (Big Sand State Park, a former Utah state park, was located at the reservoir.) (Note: While the former Big Sand State Park on the Big Sand Wash Reservoir (also known as Big Sand State Beach) is no longer a state park, it is still a recreation area that is managed by the Utah Department of Natural Resources (DNR), just not the Utah Division of Parks and Recreation (a division of the DNR).)

Road access to Upalco is primarily by State Route 87 (SR-87), which passes north–south through the community.
