= Ioka, Utah =

Unincorporated community in the state of Utah, United States

- Unincorporated community
- Location within the state of Utah
- Coordinates: 40°15′31″N 110°06′50″W
- Country: United States
- State: Utah
- County: Duchesne
- Settled: 1907
- Elevation: 5,351 ft (1,631 m)
- Time zone: UTC-7 (Mountain (MST))
  - Summer (DST): UTC-6 (MDT)
- ZIP codes: 84066
- GNIS feature ID: 1437594

Ioka is an unincorporated community in eastern Duchesne County, Utah, United States.

== Description ==
The small farming community is located in a "little valley surrounded by bluffs" within the Uintah Basin, approximately 5 miles (8.0 km) northwest of Myton and about 7 miles (11 km) southwest of Roosevelt It is located on the Uintah and Ouray Indian Reservation and was named after a Ute chief. The name means "bravado".

The main (and the only paved) road in the community is Utah State Route 87 (SR‑87/Ioka Lane/West 3000 South), which runs east‑west through the community. SR‑87 connects with U.S. Route 40/U.S. Route 191 at its eastern terminus at Ioka Junction, about the 2.8 miles (4.5 km) east of town.

== History ==
The community was first settled in 1907 and named Mural (meaning a "walled in valley"), but the name was changed to Ioka by about 1915. In 1908 a post office for the community was established, and remained in operation until 1944.
