= Utah State Route 87 =

State highway in Duchesne County, Utah, United States

State Route 87

Route information
- Maintained by UDOT
- Length: 38.159 mi (61.411 km)
- Existed: 1935–present

Major junctions
- South end: US 40 / US 191 in Duchesne
- SR-35 near Duchesne
- East end: US 40 / US 191 near Roosevelt

Location
- Country: United States
- State: Utah

Highway system
- Utah State Highway System; Interstate; US; State; Minor; Scenic
← SR-86	→ SR-88

Utah State Route 87 (SR-87) is a state highway in the U.S. state of Utah. Over a span of 38 miles (61 km), it connects the communities of Altamont, Boneta, Bluebell, and Upalco to Duchesne and US-40/191 in Duchesne County.

== Route description ==
The route begins on US-40/191 as Center Street in Duchesne and runs North across Blue Bench five miles to the intersection with State Route 35, continues north seven miles then turns east near Talmage and Mountain Home through the community of Boneta then Altamont. The road then turns southeast through the community of Upalco, and near the communities of Altonah and Bluebell. The road then turns east onto Ioka Lane that connects back into US-40/191 five miles west of Roosevelt, Utah.

== History ==
The stretch of road from Upalco to Ioka Junction at present day US-40 was designated as Route 87 in 1935. The western terminus in Upalco was an intersection with the now deleted route of SR-86. At the time, the current-day route of SR-87 was a patchwork of other small routes, encompassing parts of, starting from Duchesne, former SR-134, SR-35, former SR-221, former SR-86, and what is now the easternmost portion of SR-87.

In 1964, the route was significantly expanded to more or less its current alignment when large portions of other highways in the area were consolidated into the current SR-87. The old SR-86 which ran from Bridgeland on present-day US-40 north through Upalco to Altamont and Altonah had the stretch from Upalco to Altamont transferred to SR-87, and the northernmost stretch from Altamont to Altonah was transferred to the former SR-221, leaving SR-86 as a short connector between Upalco and Bridgeland. The entire former route of SR-221 from Mountain Home to Altamont was also transferred to SR-87, while SR-221 was realigned as a short road from Altamont to Altonah. The stretch of SR-134 from SR-35 to about 3 miles south of Mountain Home, and the stretch of SR-35 from Duchesne to its junction with SR-221 was also transferred to SR-87 at this time. With the exception of SR-35, this left all of these routes (SR-134, SR-221, and SR-86) as short connector or access roads, and they were all subsequently deleted from the state route system in 1969.

== Major intersections ==
The entire route is in Duchesne County.

Location	mi	km	Destinations	Notes
Duchesne	0.000	0.000	US 40 / US 191 – Heber City, Price	Southern terminus
	5.947	9.571	SR-35 – Tabiona	
Ioka Junction	38.159	61.411	US 40 / US 191 – Roosevelt	Eastern terminus
1.000 mi = 1.609 km; 1.000 km = 0.621 mi
