= Utahn =

Utahn may refer to:

- the demonym of Utah
- Utahn, Utah, US, an unincorporated community
