= Mountain Home, Utah =

Unincorporated community in the state of Utah, United States

- Unincorporated community
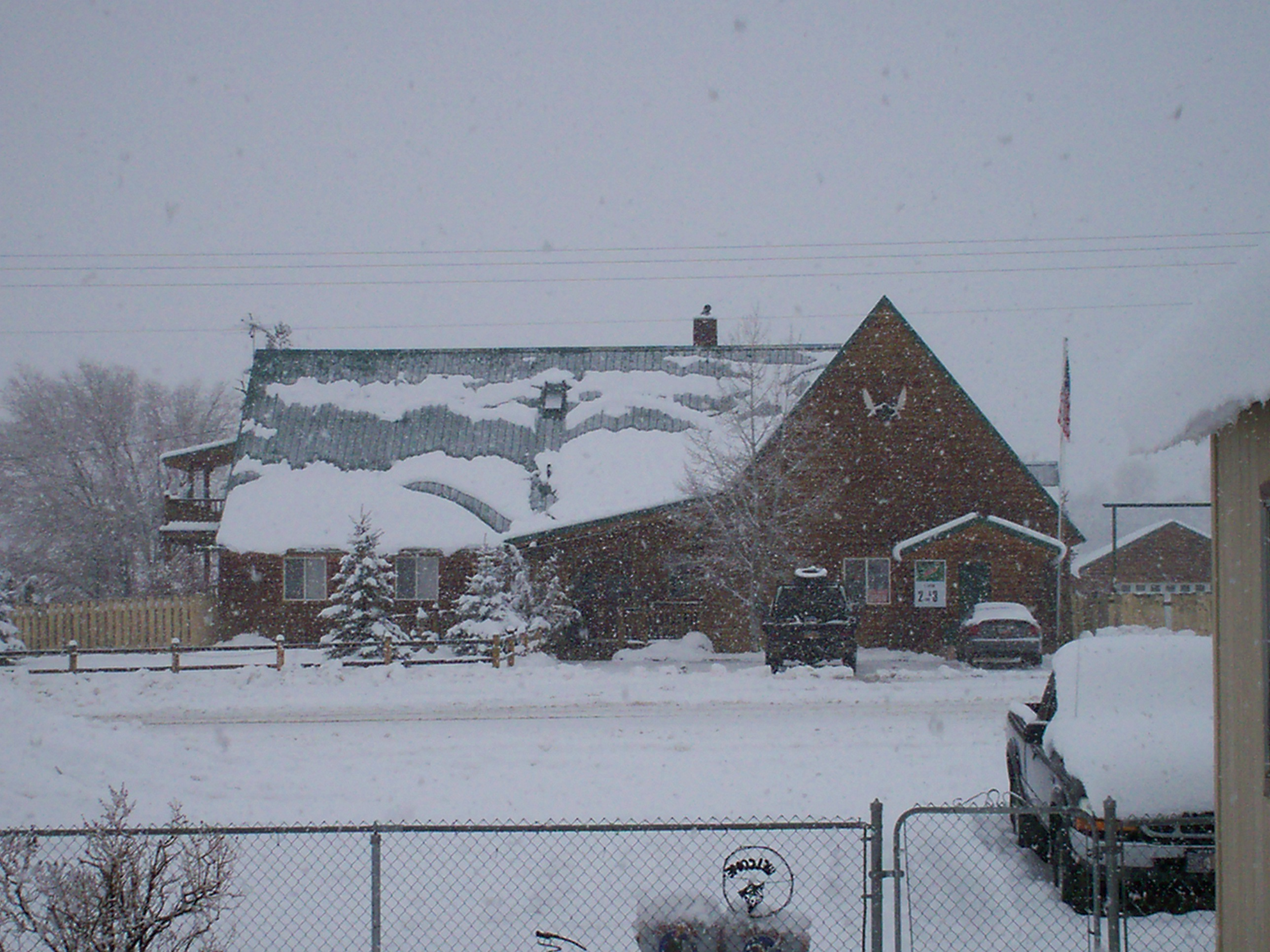
- Snow covered Rock Creek Store & Bed and Breakfast in Mountain Home, December 2010

- Location of Mountain home within the State of Utah Mountain Home (the United States)
- Coordinates: 40°23′57″N 110°23′19″W
- Country: United States
- State: Utah
- County: Duchesne
- Settled: 1905
- Elevation: 7,005 ft (2,135 m)
- Time zone: UTC-7 (Mountain (MST))
  - Summer (DST): UTC-6 (MDT)
- ZIP code: 84051
- Area code: 435
- GNIS feature ID: 1430527

Mountain Home is an unincorporated community in central Duchesne County, Utah, United States, adjacent to the Uintah and Ouray Indian Reservation.

== Description ==
Historical population
| Census | Pop. | Note | %± |
|---|---|---|---|
| 1920 | 415 | | — |
| 1930 | 273 | | −34.2% |
| 1940 | 326 | | 19.4% |
| 1950 | 326 | | 0.0% |
Source: U.S. Census Bureau

The community lies along local roads north of State Route 87, north of the city of Duchesne, the county seat of Duchesne County. Its elevation is 7,005 feet (2,135 m) above sea level. Originally settled in 1905 as part of the Moon Lake Ward of the LDS Church, Mountain Home is situated in a fertile valley primarily used for raising range cattle.

Known as the "Gateway to the High Uintas", the community is home to notable old families, including the Farnsworths, Thaynes and the Mileses. Popular attractions include the Rock Creek Store and Bed and Breakfast, as well as the 7-11 Ranch. The Rock Creek Store and Bed & Breakfast is the original building that once housed the Moon Lake First Ward church. Mountain Home is also the birthplace of Evan Mecham, who served as Governor of Arizona.

Although Mountain Home is unincorporated, it has a post office, with the ZIP code of 84051.

== See also ==
- High Uintas Wilderness
- Upper Stillwater Reservoir
- Moon Lake (Utah)
- Uintah and Ouray Indian Reservation
