= Uintah Indian Irrigation Project =

Indian irrigation project in Uintah Basin

The Uintah Indian Irrigation Project is the principal Indian irrigation project in the Uintah Basin. The United States Bureau of Indian Affairs designed and constructed this project. The project was authorized in 1906, soon after the US Indian Irrigation Service was established as part of the Bureau of Indian Affairs. However, non-Indian irrigators largely controlled the infrastructure, generally benefiting more from the project than Ute Indians in the Uinta Basin.

By 1935, the Uintah Indian Irrigation Project was irrigating over 77,000 acres (310 km^{2}) of Indian land. Today, it continues to serve Indian and non-Indian irrigators in the drainage of the Lake Fork River and elsewhere in the Basin. It continues to be owned by the Bureau of Indian Affairs, which has responsibility for its operation; however, operation has been turned over to a quasi-private operation and maintenance company organized in accordance with provisions of the Central Utah Project Completion Act.

== See also ==
- Moon Lake (Utah)
- Uintah and Ouray Indian Reservation
- Ute Indian Rights Settlement

== Sources ==
- Fuller, Craig (1994), "Irrigation in Utah", in Powell, Allan Kent (ed.), Utah History Encyclopedia, Salt Lake City, Utah: University of Utah Press, ISBN 0874804256, OCLC 30473917
