= Fruitland, Utah =

Unincorporated community in the state of Utah, United States

- Unincorporated community
- Location within the state of Utah
- Coordinates: 40°12′46″N 110°50′23″W
- Country: United States
- State: Utah
- County: Duchesne
- Elevation: 6,624 ft (2,019 m)
- Time zone: UTC-7 (Mountain (MST))
  - Summer (DST): UTC-6 (MDT)
- ZIP codes: 84027
- GNIS feature ID: 1437564

Fruitland is an unincorporated community in western Duchesne County, Utah, United States, on the Uintah and Ouray Indian Reservation.

== Description ==
Historical population
Census	Pop.	Note	%±
1920	202		—
1930	121		−40.1%
1940	146		20.7%
1950	127		−13.0%
Source: U.S. Census Bureau

The community lies along U.S. Route 40, 25 miles west of the city of Duchesne, the county seat of Duchesne County. Its elevation is 6,624 feet (2,019 m). Although Fruitland is unincorporated, it had a post office until 2015. Mail sent to Fruitland's ZIP code of 84027 is delivered to the old post office location by a Post Office Highway Contract worker. There is a public mail box but no other Post Office services are available.

Fruitland has an active Special Services District, which brings high quality low priced water to local homes and farms. It has several large pump facilities treating and supplying water to the area. Many homes have private wells and others take their water tanks to the SSD fill location.

Fruitland has a busy local store with basic groceries, gas, diesel and a cafe. The last census, in 2016, counted 539 people. Many homes in the area are recreational. Surrounded by Strawberry, Starvation, Red Creek and Current Creek reservoirs Fruitland is popular for fishing and water recreation. The reservoirs freeze in the winter, bringing many ice fishers.

The settlement was originally called Rabbit Gulch, but unscrupulous land developers renamed it Fruitland in 1907, hoping to draw the unwary to buy land that was unsuitable for growing any kind of fruit.

== Climate ==
This climatic region is typified by large seasonal temperature differences, with warm to hot (and often humid) summers and cold (sometimes severely cold) winters. According to the Köppen Climate Classification system, Fruitland has a humid continental climate, abbreviated "Dfb" on climate maps.
