= Moon Lake (Utah) =

Reservoir in the state of Utah, United States

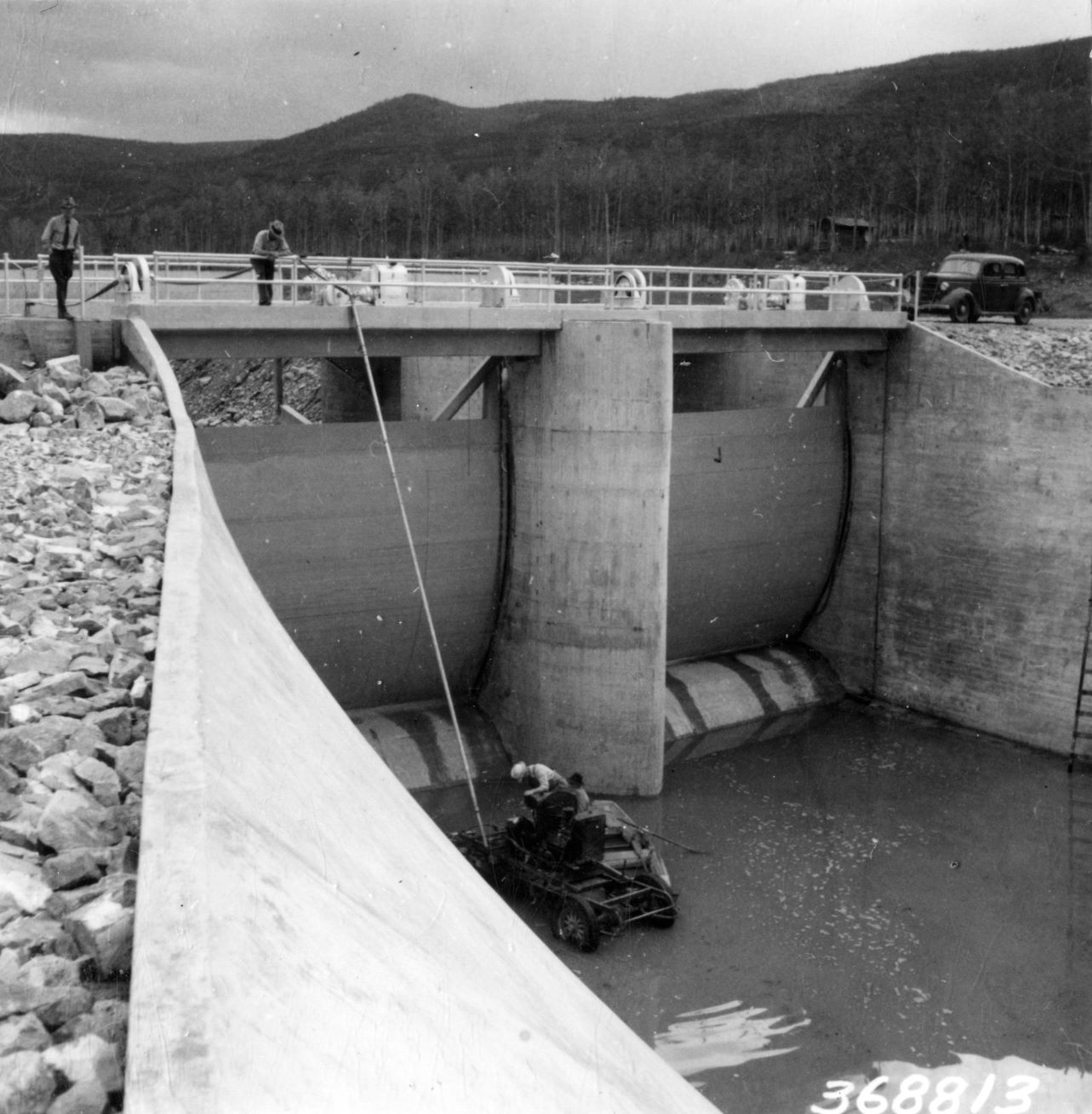
- Moon Lake Dam, 1938

- Location within Utah Location within the United States
- Location: Duchesne County, Utah
- Coordinates: 40.562447°N 110.489606°W
- Type: Reservoir
- Basin countries: United States
- Surface elevation: 8,087 ft (2,465 m)
- Website: Moon Lake Campground

Moon Lake is a high mountain reservoir on the south slope of the High Uintas in Duchesne County, Utah. Recreation management is under the jurisdiction of the U.S. Forest Service, as the lake is part of the Ashley National Forest.

In 1938, the United States Bureau of Reclamation completed the earthen Moon Lake Dam on the Lake Fork River to expand the size of the existing natural lake for irrigation. The dam has a height of 98 feet, and the expanded reservoir a capacity of 49,500 acre-feet.

== Climate ==
Climate data for Moon Lake, Utah, 1991–2020 normals: 8125ft (2477m)
| Month | Jan | Feb | Mar | Apr | May | Jun | Jul | Aug | Sep | Oct | Nov | Dec | Year |
|---|---|---|---|---|---|---|---|---|---|---|---|---|---|
| Mean daily maximum °F (°C) | 30.9 (−0.6) | 34.1 (1.2) | 40.6 (4.8) | 49.1 (9.5) | 58.6 (14.8) | 69.5 (20.8) | 77.3 (25.2) | 77.5 (25.3) | 67.5 (19.7) | 55.5 (13.1) | 40.1 (4.5) | 30.6 (−0.8) | 52.6 (11.5) |
| Daily mean °F (°C) | 18.9 (−7.3) | 23.1 (−4.9) | 29.2 (−1.6) | 36.3 (2.4) | 46.1 (7.8) | 54.6 (12.6) | 62.9 (17.2) | 63.5 (17.5) | 54.1 (12.3) | 43.3 (6.3) | 31.0 (−0.6) | 21.1 (−6.1) | 40.3 (4.6) |
| Mean daily minimum °F (°C) | 6.9 (−13.9) | 12.0 (−11.1) | 17.8 (−7.9) | 23.5 (−4.7) | 33.5 (0.8) | 39.7 (4.3) | 48.4 (9.1) | 49.4 (9.7) | 40.7 (4.8) | 31.1 (−0.5) | 21.9 (−5.6) | 11.5 (−11.4) | 28.0 (−2.2) |
Source: NOAA

Lakefork #1 is a SNOTEL weather station above Moon Lake, near the peak of Lake Fork Mountain, at an elevation of 10415 feet (3174 m).

Climate data for Lakefork #1, Utah, 2006–2020 normals: 10415ft (3174m)
| Month | Jan | Feb | Mar | Apr | May | Jun | Jul | Aug | Sep | Oct | Nov | Dec | Year |
|---|---|---|---|---|---|---|---|---|---|---|---|---|---|
| Record high °F (°C) | 56 (13) | 54 (12) | 57 (14) | 62 (17) | 66 (19) | 75 (24) | 75 (24) | 76 (24) | 75 (24) | 66 (19) | 57 (14) | 54 (12) | 76 (24) |
| Mean maximum °F (°C) | 49.0 (9.4) | 47.1 (8.4) | 50.3 (10.2) | 55.8 (13.2) | 61.4 (16.3) | 69.8 (21.0) | 72.9 (22.7) | 70.9 (21.6) | 67.7 (19.8) | 58.8 (14.9) | 53.2 (11.8) | 47.8 (8.8) | 73.0 (22.8) |
| Mean daily maximum °F (°C) | 33.9 (1.1) | 32.7 (0.4) | 38.5 (3.6) | 42.8 (6.0) | 49.6 (9.8) | 60.5 (15.8) | 66.7 (19.3) | 64.5 (18.1) | 57.5 (14.2) | 46.8 (8.2) | 38.9 (3.8) | 31.5 (−0.3) | 47.0 (8.3) |
| Daily mean °F (°C) | 18.9 (−7.3) | 17.8 (−7.9) | 23.7 (−4.6) | 29.2 (−1.6) | 37.3 (2.9) | 47.0 (8.3) | 53.1 (11.7) | 50.9 (10.5) | 44.4 (6.9) | 34.6 (1.4) | 25.6 (−3.6) | 17.1 (−8.3) | 33.3 (0.7) |
| Mean daily minimum °F (°C) | 3.8 (−15.7) | 2.8 (−16.2) | 8.8 (−12.9) | 15.6 (−9.1) | 25.0 (−3.9) | 33.4 (0.8) | 39.5 (4.2) | 37.4 (3.0) | 31.3 (−0.4) | 22.4 (−5.3) | 12.2 (−11.0) | 2.8 (−16.2) | 19.6 (−6.9) |
| Mean minimum °F (°C) | −16.8 (−27.1) | −17.8 (−27.7) | −11.2 (−24.0) | −3.1 (−19.5) | 9.8 (−12.3) | 23.8 (−4.6) | 32.0 (0.0) | 29.8 (−1.2) | 20.1 (−6.6) | 4.6 (−15.2) | −9.8 (−23.2) | −19.4 (−28.6) | −22.9 (−30.5) |
| Record low °F (°C) | −30 (−34) | −27 (−33) | −16 (−27) | −13 (−25) | −2 (−19) | 16 (−9) | 28 (−2) | 24 (−4) | 15 (−9) | −10 (−23) | −23 (−31) | −30 (−34) | −30 (−34) |
| Average precipitation inches (mm) | 2.17 (55) | 2.34 (59) | 2.05 (52) | 2.34 (59) | 2.13 (54) | 1.40 (36) | 1.91 (49) | 2.28 (58) | 2.50 (64) | 2.42 (61) | 2.13 (54) | 2.36 (60) | 26.03 (661) |
Source 1: XMACIS2
Source 2: NOAA (Precipitation)

== Folklore ==
The Moon Lake Monster, also known as "Moonie," is described as a black, bumpy creature resembling a log with a fin. Witnesses have reported sightings, including an account of a large object following a boat, with water moving over what appeared to be scales.

Another story involves the ghost of a young girl said to have drowned in the lake. Witnesses describe her as appearing wet, with blue lips, before disappearing when approached. Some have also reported hearing sounds of crying or splashing near the lake.

== See also ==
- Uinta Indian Irrigation Project
