= Big Sand Wash Reservoir =

Reservoir in the state of Utah, United States

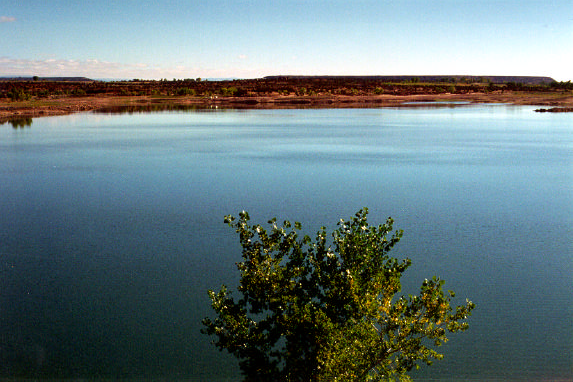
- Big Sand Wash Reservoir

- Location within Utah
- Location: Duchesne County, Utah
- Coordinates: 40°17′53″N 110°13′34″W
- Type: reservoir
- Basin countries: United States
- Surface elevation: 5,886 ft (1,794 m)

Big Sand Wash Reservoir is a reservoir in eastern Duchesne County, Utah, United States. it was built in 1964

== See also ==
- List of dams and reservoirs in Utah
- reservoirs
