= Talmage, Utah =

Unincorporated community in the state of Utah, United States

- Unincorporated community
- Location within the state of Utah Talmage (the United States)
- Coordinates: 40°20′24″N 110°25′39″W
- Country: United States
- State: Utah
- County: Duchesne
- Settled: 1907
- Named for: James E. Talmage
- Elevation: 6,834 ft (2,083 m)
- Time zone: UTC-7 (Mountain (MST))
  - Summer (DST): UTC-6 (MDT)
- ZIP codes: 84073
- Area code: 435
- GNIS feature ID: 1433175

Talmage is an unincorporated community in central Duchesne County, Utah, United States.

== Description ==
Historical population
Census	Pop.	Note	%±
1920	295		—
1930	222		−24.7%
1940	195		−12.2%
1950	174		−10.8%
Source: U.S. Census Bureau

The community lies along the former Utah State Route 134 (1933-1969), and west of the current Utah State Route 87. Its elevation is 6,834 feet (2,083 m). Although Talmage is unincorporated, it has its own ZIP code of 84073.

== History ==
The town was founded in 1907 and named Winn in 1912, but renamed in 1914 to honor Latter-day Saint leader James E. Talmage.

The Talmage Post Office, which was hosted in a small bedroom in the home of long-time postmaster Warner Nielsen, closed after his death in 2003.

== Climate ==
According to the Köppen Climate Classification system, Talmage has a semi-arid climate, abbreviated "BSk" on climate maps.
