= Mount Emmons, Utah =

Unincorporated community in the state of Utah, United States

- Unincorporated community
- Location within Utah Location within the United States
- Coordinates: 40°20′52″N 110°16′31″W
- Country: United States
- State: Utah
- County: Duchesne
- Elevation: 6,293 ft (1,918 m)
- Time zone: UTC-7 (Mountain (MST))
  - Summer (DST): UTC-6 (MDT)
- Area code: 435
- GNIS feature ID: 1430521

Mount Emmons is an unincorporated community in Duchesne County, Utah, United States. The community is on Utah State Route 87 1 mile (1.6 km) southeast of Altamont.
