= Gusher, Utah =

Unincorporated community in the state of Utah, United States

- Unincorporated community
- Location within Utah Location within the United States
- Coordinates: 40°18′07″N 109°49′07″W
- Country: United States
- State: Utah
- County: Uintah
- Elevation: 5,069 ft (1,545 m)
- Time zone: UTC-7 (Mountain (MST))
  - Summer (DST): UTC-6 (MDT)
- Area code: 435
- GNIS feature ID: 1428449

Gusher is an unincorporated community in Uintah County, Utah, United States. The community is on U.S. Routes 40 and 191 6.5 miles (10.5 km) east of Ballard.
