= Bluebell, Utah =

- Census-designated place
- Location in Duchesne County and the state of Utah
- Coordinates: 40°21′58″N 110°13′50″W
- Country: United States
- State: Utah
- County: Duchesne

Area
  - Total: 9.76 sq mi (25.28 km^{2})
  - Land: 9.74 sq mi (25.23 km^{2})
  - Water: 0.019 sq mi (0.05 km^{2})
- Elevation: 6,221 ft (1,896 m)

Population (2020)
  - Total: 278
  - Density: 28.5/sq mi (11.0/km^{2})
- Time zone: UTC-7 (Mountain (MST))
  - Summer (DST): UTC-6 (MDT)
- ZIP code: 84007
- FIPS code: 49-06590
- GNIS feature ID: 2584756

Bluebell is a census-designated place in eastern Duchesne County, Utah, United States, on the Uintah and Ouray Indian Reservation. The population as of the 2020 census was 278, down from 293 at the 2010 census. It lies along local roads east of State Route 87, northeast of the city of Duchesne, the county seat of Duchesne County. Its elevation is 6,201 feet (1,890 m) above sea level. Although Bluebell is unincorporated, it has a post office, with the ZIP code of 84007.

== Climate ==
According to the Köppen Climate Classification system, Bluebell has a semi-arid climate, abbreviated "BSk" on climate maps.

== See also ==
- List of census-designated places in Utah
