= Tridell, Utah =

Unincorporated community in the state of Utah, United States

Tridell
- Unincorporated community
- Location of Tidell within the State of Utah Location of Tidell within the United States
- Coordinates: 40°27′13″N 109°51′0″W
- Country: United States
- State: Utah
- County: Uintah
- Named for: Consisting of three dales (small valleys)
- Elevation: 5,636 ft (1,718 m)
- Time zone: UTC-7 (Mountain (MST))
  - Summer (DST): UTC-6 (MDT)
- ZIP codes: 84076
- GNIS feature ID: 1433670

Tridell (originally named Liberty) is an unincorporated community in the Uinta Basin in western Uintah County, Utah, United States.

== Description ==
Historical population
Census	Pop.	Note	%±
1940	432		—
1950	347		−19.7%
Source: U.S. Census Bureau

The settlement lies along local roads north of State Route 121, approximately 25 miles west of the city of Vernal, the county seat of Uintah County. Until the highway was deleted from the state highway system in 1969, Tridell was the northern terminus for State Route 246. Its elevation is 5,636 feet (1,718 m), and it is located at 40°27′13″N 109°51′0″W (40.4535682, -109.8498700). Although Tridell is unincorporated, it has had a post office, with the ZIP code of 84076, since 1918. (However, the post office became a rural station in 1964.)

== Climate ==
According to the Köppen Climate Classification system, Tridell has a semi-arid climate, abbreviated "BSk" on climate maps.
