= Altonah, Utah =

Unincorporated community in the state of Utah, United States

- Unincorporated community
- Location within the state of Utah
- Coordinates: 40°24′05″N 110°17′38″W
- Country: United States
- State: Utah
- County: Duchesne
- Settled: 1906
- Elevation: 6,674 ft (2,034 m)
- Time zone: UTC-7 (Mountain (MST))
  - Summer (DST): UTC-6 (MDT)
- ZIP codes: 84002
- GNIS feature ID: 1425097

Altonah (also Altona) is an unincorporated community in central Duchesne County, Utah, United States.

== Description ==
Historical population
Census	Pop.	Note	%±
1920	626		—
1930	528		−15.7%
1940	592		12.1%
1950	363		−38.7%
Source: U.S. Census Bureau

The community is located on the Uintah and Ouray Indian Reservation along local roads north of State Route 87, north of the city of Duchesne, the county seat of Duchesne County. It is situated at the southern base of the Uinta Mountains and has an elevation of 6,673 feet (2,034 m). Although Altonah is unincorporated, it has a post office, with the ZIP code of 84002.

Altonah was originally settled in 1906, under the name of Alexander. It was renamed in 1912.
