= Bridgeland, Utah =

Unincorporated community in the state of Utah, United States

- Unincorporated community
- Location within Utah Location within the United States
- Coordinates: 40°09′47″N 110°14′04″W
- Country: United States
- State: Utah
- County: Duchesne
- Elevation: 5,296 ft (1,614 m)
- Time zone: UTC-7 (Mountain (MST))
  - Summer (DST): UTC-6 (MDT)
- Area code: 435
- GNIS feature ID: 1437513

Bridgeland is an unincorporated community in Duchesne County, Utah, United States. The community is on the Duchesne River near U.S. Routes 40 and 191, 8.9 miles (14.3 km) east of Duchesne.
