= Duchesne County, Utah =

County in Utah, United States

- County
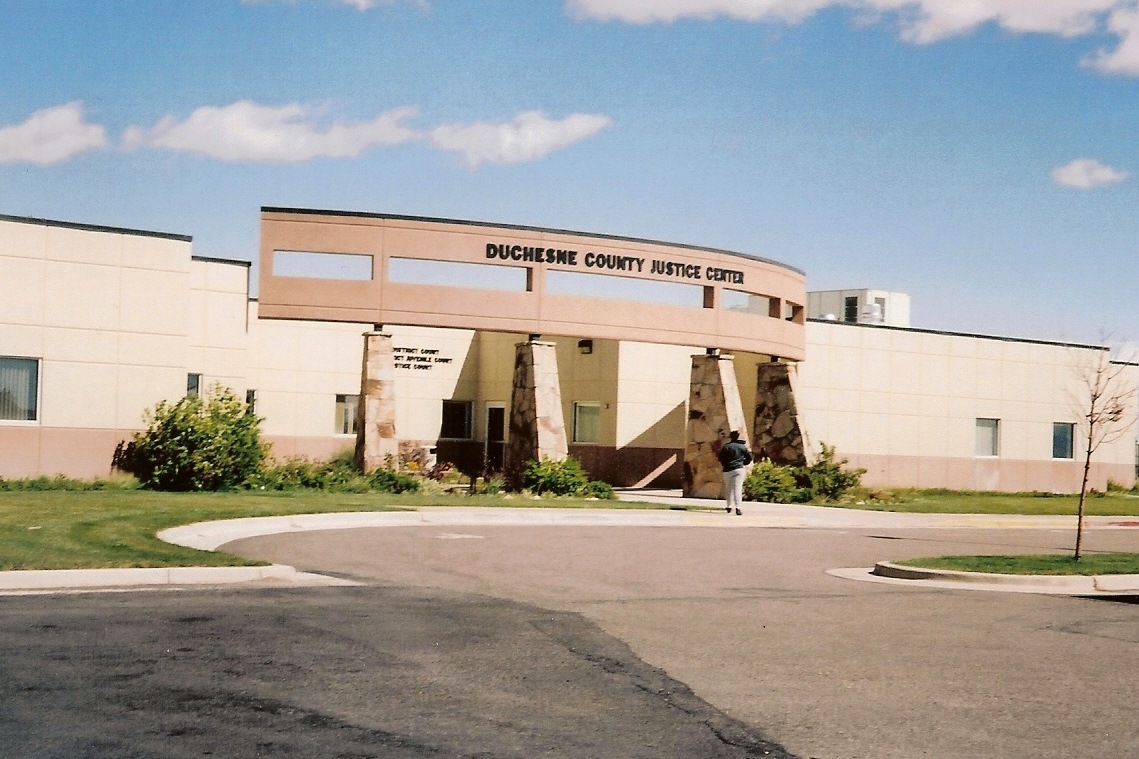
- Duchesne County Courthouse in Duchesne

- Seal

- Location within the U.S. state of Utah
- Coordinates: 40°17′N 110°26′W
- Country: United States
- State: Utah
- Founded: January 4, 1915 (proclaimed in effect)
- Named for: Duchesne River
- Seat: Duchesne
- Largest city: Roosevelt

Area
  - Total: 3,256 sq mi (8,430 km^{2})
  - Land: 3,241 sq mi (8,390 km^{2})
  - Water: 15 sq mi (39 km^{2}) 0.50%

Population (2020)
  - Total: 19,596
  - Estimate (2025): 20,856 ▲
  - Density: 6.046/sq mi (2.334/km^{2})
- Time zone: UTC−7 (Mountain)
  - Summer (DST): UTC−6 (MDT)
- Congressional district: 3rd
- Website: duchesne.utah.gov

Duchesne County (/duːˈʃeɪn/ doo-SHAYN) is a county in the northeast part of the U.S. state of Utah. As of the 2020 United States census, the population was 19,596. Its county seat is Duchesne, and the largest city is Roosevelt.

== History ==
Much of Duchesne County was part of the Uintah Reservation, created 1861 by US President Abraham Lincoln as a permanent home of the Uintah and White River Utes. Later the Uncompahgre Utes were moved to the Uintah and newly created Uncompahgre Indian reservations from western Colorado. At the turn of the century, under the Dawes Act, both Indian reservations were thrown open to homesteaders. This was done after allotments of land were made to Indians of the three tribes. The homesteading process was opened on the Uintah on August 27, 1905.

Unlike much of the rest of Utah Territory, settlement of the future Duchesne County area did not occur due to LDS Church pressures. It was settled by individuals who obtained 160 acres under the federal Homestead Act. Homesteaders were required to prove that they intended to farm the land. After five years of living on the land, making improvements, and paying $1.25 per acre, homesteaders were given title to their homesteads.

On July 13, 1914, a referendum was presented to voters of Wasatch County to partition the eastern part into a separate county. The referendum passed, so Utah Governor William Spry proclaimed on January 4, 1915. The county seat was decided by county vote on November 5, 1914, election. The new county was named for its county seat, which in turn was called for the Duchesne River, which flows southward and then eastward through the central part of the county near the city. Its name is of uncertain origin, but the holding theory is that fur trappers named it in the 1820s in honor of Mother Rose Philippine Duchesne, founder of the School of the Sacred Heart near St. Louis, Missouri, although other theories as to the name exist. The county boundary with Uintah County was adjusted by legislative act on March 5, 1917; Duchesne County boundaries have remained in their current configuration since that date.

== Geography ==
Duchesne County's terrain is semi-arid, rough, and scarred with drainages. The Duchesne River drains the central part of the county. The county generally slopes to the south and east. The county has a total area of 3,256 square miles (8,430 km^{2}), of which 3,241 square miles (8,390 km^{2}) is land and 15 square miles (39 km^{2}) (0.5%) is water. The northern part of the county contains much of the east–west oriented Uinta Mountains. The highest natural point in Utah, Kings Peak at 13,528 feet (4,123 m), is located in Duchesne County.

=== Major highways ===
- US 40
- US 191
- SR-35
- SR-87
- SR-121
- SR-150
- SR-208

=== Adjacent counties ===
- Summit County - north
- Daggett County - northeast
- Uintah County - east
- Carbon County - south
- Utah County - southwest
- Wasatch County - west

=== Protected areas ===
- Ashley National Forest (part)
- Big Sand State Park
- Currant Creek Wildlife Management Area
- High Uintas Wilderness (part)
- Red Creek Wildlife Management Area
- Skitzy Wildlife Management Area
- Starvation State Park
- Wasatch-Cache National Forest (part)

=== Lakes ===
- Big Sand Wash Reservoir
- Cedar View Reservoir
- Chepeta Lake
- Crater Lake
- Daynes Lake
- Grandaddy Lake
- Kidney Lake
- Lake Atwood
- Mirror Lake
- Moon Lake
- Starvation Reservoir
- Upper Stillwater Reservoir

== Demographics ==
Historical population
Census	Pop.	Note	%±
1920	9,093		—
1930	8,263		−9.1%
1940	8,958		8.4%
1950	8,134		−9.2%
1960	7,179		−11.7%
1970	7,299		1.7%
1980	12,565		72.1%
1990	12,645		0.6%
2000	14,371		13.6%
2010	18,607		29.5%
2020	19,596		5.3%
2025 (est.)	20,856	▲	6.4%
US Decennial Census; 1790–1960 1900–1990; 1990–2000 2010 2020

=== 2020 census ===
According to the 2020 United States census and 2020 American Community Survey, there were 19,596 people in Duchesne County with a population density of 6.1 people per square mile (2.3/km^{2}). Among non-Hispanic or Latino people, the racial makeup was 16,736 (85.4%) White, 21 (0.1%) African American, 875 (4.5%) Native American, 60 (0.3%) Asian, 39 (0.2%) Pacific Islander, 47 (0.2%) from other races, and 533 (2.7%) from two or more races. 1,285 (6.6%) people were Hispanic or Latino.

Duchesne County, Utah – Racial and ethnic composition Note: the US Census treats Hispanic/Latino as an ethnic category. This table excludes Latinos from the racial categories and assigns them to a separate category. Hispanics/Latinos may be of any race.
Race / Ethnicity (NH = Non-Hispanic)	Pop 2000	Pop 2010	Pop 2020	% 2000	% 2010	% 2020
White alone (NH)	12,764	16,211	16,736	88.82%	87.12%	85.41%
Black or African American alone (NH)	18	31	21	0.13%	0.17%	0.11%
Native American or Alaska Native alone (NH)	723	771	875	5.03%	4.14%	4.47%
Asian alone (NH)	27	45	60	0.19%	0.24%	0.31%
Pacific Islander alone (NH)	8	45	39	0.06%	0.24%	0.20%
Other race alone (NH)	9	18	47	0.06%	0.10%	0.24%
Mixed race or Multiracial (NH)	314	369	533	2.18%	1.98%	2.72%
Hispanic or Latino (any race)	508	1,117	1,285	3.53%	6.00%	6.56%
Total	14,371	18,607	19,596	100.00%	100.00%	100.00%

There were 9,933 (50.69%) males and 9,663 (49.31%) females, and the population distribution by age was 6,328 (32.3%) under the age of 18, 10,598 (54.1%) from 18 to 64, and 2,670 (13.6%) who were at least 65 years old. The median age was 33.3 years.

There were 6,511 households in Duchesne County with an average size of 3.01 of which 4,937 (75.8%) were families and 1,574 (24.2%) were non-families. Among all families, 3,986 (61.2%) were married couples, 363 (5.6%) were male householders with no spouse, and 588 (9.0%) were female householders with no spouse. Among all non-families, 1,312 (20.2%) were a single person living alone and 262 (4.0%) were two or more people living together. 2,748 (42.2%) of all households had children under the age of 18. 5,124 (78.7%) of households were owner-occupied while 1,387 (21.3%) were renter-occupied.

The median income for a Duchesne County household was $61,655 and the median family income was $69,216, with a per-capita income of $25,086. The median income for males that were full-time employees was $62,929 and for females $35,847. 13.9% of the population and 11.0% of families were below the poverty line.

In terms of education attainment, out of the 11,755 people in Duchesne County 25 years or older, 1,270 (10.8%) had not completed high school, 4,510 (38.4%) had a high school diploma or equivalency, 4,362 (37.1%) had some college or associate degree, 1,159 (9.9%) had a bachelor's degree, and 454 (3.9%) had a graduate or professional degree.

=== 2010 census ===
As of the 2010 United States census, there were 18,607 people, 6,003 households, and 4,703 families in the county. The population density was 5.74 people per square mile (2.22 people/km^{2}). There were 6,988 housing units at an average density of 2.16 units per square mile (0.83 units/km^{2}). The racial makeup of the county was 89.15% White, 0.24% Black or African American, 4.53% Native American, 0.28% Asian, 0.27% Pacific Islander, 2.64% from other races, and 2.89% from two or more races. 6.00% of the population were Hispanic or Latino of any race.

There were 6,003 households, of which 40.23% had children under 18 living with them, 64.72% were married couples living together, 8.65% had a female householder with no husband present, and 21.66% were non-families. 45.0% of all households had individuals under 18, and 22.6% had someone living alone who was 65 years of age or older. The average household size was 3.05, and the average family size was 3.47.

The county population contained 33.91% under the age of 18, 6.56% from 20 to 24, 25.38% from 25 to 44, 20.92% from 45 to 64, and 10.66% who were 65 years of age or older. The median age was 29.7 years. For every 100 females, there were 102.80 males. For every 100 females aged 18 and over, there were 100.00 males.

The median income for a household in the county was $31,298, and the median income for a family was $35,350. Males had a median income of $31,988 versus $19,692 for females. The per capita income for the county was $12,326. About 14.20% of families and 16.80% of the population were below the poverty line, including 19.60% of those under age 18 and 12.40% of those aged 65 or over.

=== Ancestry ===
As of 2015 the largest self-reported ancestry groups in Duchesne County, Utah are:

Largest ancestries (2015)	Percent
English	31.9%
German	10.6%
Irish	7.4%
American	6.4%
Danish	4.5%
Scottish	4.3%
Swedish	3.2%
Italian	2.3%
Norwegian	1.6%
Welsh	3.1%

== Politics and government ==
- Clair Poulson, West Side Precinct Justice Court Judge
- Travis Tucker, Sheriff
- JoAnn Evans, County Clerk-Auditor

Duchesne County voters are traditionally Republican. In no national election since 1964 has the county selected the Democratic Party candidate (as of 2024).

State elected offices
Position	District	Name	Affiliation	First elected
Senate	26	Ronald Winterton	Republican	2018
House of Representatives	53	Kera Birkeland	Republican	2020
House of Representatives	55	Scott Chew	Republican	2014
House of Representatives	69	Christine Watkins	Republican	2016
Board of Education	12	James Moss Jr.	Republican	2020

United States presidential election results for Duchesne County, Utah
Year	Republican		Democratic		Third party(ies)	
Year	No.	%	No.	%	No.	%
1916	687	26.95%	1,443	56.61%	419	16.44%
1920	1,523	61.76%	822	33.33%	121	4.91%
1924	1,277	57.60%	731	32.97%	209	9.43%
1928	1,585	63.48%	899	36.00%	13	0.52%
1932	1,333	43.39%	1,590	51.76%	149	4.85%
1936	1,070	34.68%	1,970	63.86%	45	1.46%
1940	1,322	39.96%	1,982	59.92%	4	0.12%
1944	1,140	41.17%	1,629	58.83%	0	0.00%
1948	1,266	44.11%	1,588	55.33%	16	0.56%
1952	1,969	61.32%	1,242	38.68%	0	0.00%
1956	1,856	67.99%	874	32.01%	0	0.00%
1960	1,546	56.98%	1,166	42.98%	1	0.04%
1964	1,251	48.66%	1,320	51.34%	0	0.00%
1968	1,733	61.15%	858	30.28%	243	8.57%
1972	2,183	70.49%	629	20.31%	285	9.20%
1976	2,619	65.77%	1,110	27.88%	253	6.35%
1980	3,827	79.41%	854	17.72%	138	2.86%
1984	4,437	85.16%	746	14.32%	27	0.52%
1988	3,118	70.82%	1,227	27.87%	58	1.32%
1992	1,983	43.44%	772	16.91%	1,810	39.65%
1996	2,648	63.67%	892	21.45%	619	14.88%
2000	3,622	79.67%	779	17.14%	145	3.19%
2004	4,742	85.35%	738	13.28%	76	1.37%
2008	4,689	81.24%	911	15.78%	172	2.98%
2012	5,698	89.32%	581	9.11%	100	1.57%
2016	5,508	78.82%	500	7.16%	980	14.02%
2020	7,513	88.14%	843	9.89%	168	1.97%
2024	7,815	87.14%	1,009	11.25%	144	1.61%

== Communities ==
=== Cities ===
- Duchesne (county seat)
- Myton
- Roosevelt

=== Towns ===
- Altamont
- Tabiona

=== Census-designated places ===
- Bluebell
- Neola

=== Unincorporated communities ===
- Altonah
- Arcadia
- Boneta
- Bridgeland
- Crescent
- Fruitland
- Hanna
- Hayden (part)
- Ioka
- Monarch
- Mount Emmons
- Mountain Home
- Stockmore
- Strawberry
- Talmage
- Upalco
- Utahn

=== Former communities ===
- Cedarview
- Harper

== Education ==
All areas in the county are in the Duchesne School District.

== See also ==
- List of counties in Utah
- National Register of Historic Places listings in Duchesne County, Utah
