= U.S. Route 40 in Utah =

Section of U.S. Highway in Utah

U.S. Route 40
- US 40 highlighted in red

Route information
- Maintained by UDOT
- Length: 174.624 mi (281.030 km)
- Existed: 1926–present
- Tourist routes: Victory Highway

Major junctions
- West end: I-80 in Silver Summit
- US 189 in Heber City; US 191 in Duchesne; US 191 in Vernal
- East end: US 40 at the Colorado state line near Dinosaur, CO

Location
- Country: United States
- State: Utah
- Counties: Summit, Wasatch, Duchesne, Uintah

Highway system
- United States Numbered Highway System; List; Special; Divided; Utah State Highway System; Interstate; US; State; Minor; Scenic
← SR-39	→ SR-42

The west end of U.S. Route 40 (US-40) is in the U.S. state of Utah at Silver Creek Junction in Silver Summit (about 20.7 miles (33.3 km) east of Salt Lake City) with Interstate 80. From there it heads southeast through Heber City and east into Colorado on its way to the Mid-Atlantic.

== Route description ==
U.S. Route 40 begins at I-80 at Silver Creek Junction in Silver Summit, traveling south-southeast as a full freeway in a broad valley northeast of Park City. At the south end of the valley, Jordanelle Reservoir comes into view and US-40 continues south high on the slope above its western shore while Utah State Route 248 climbs away to the east on the slope overlooking the northern shore. The freeway passes through several large cuttings in the side of the mountains that were dug when US-40 was relocated to make way for the reservoir; Utah State Route 319 provides access down the slope to a state park on the shore of the reservoir. South of the reservoir, the dam is visible on the left and the road loses elevation quickly before abruptly connecting to an exurban non-freeway segment with frequent curb cuts and building frontage. In central Heber, U.S. Highway 189 continues south, but US-40 turns east to leave the city. US-40 continues south and east through mountains and the Uintah Basin to the Colorado border near Dinosaur National Monument.

== History ==
The Utah State Road Commission took over what would become US 40 from Kimball Junction to Colorado in 1910 and 1911. In late 1926, the American Association of State Highway Officials (AASHO) assigned the US 40 designation to this cross-state route, as part of one of the original U.S. Highway system.

As with most states, this new US 40 followed the route of the Victory Highway through Utah. This auto trail had been organized in 1921, and overlapped the older Lincoln Highway through Salt Lake City. To the west, it split from the Lincoln at Mills Junction, and took a straight path across the Great Salt Lake Desert on the proposed Wendover Cut-off to Nevada. The east split with the Lincoln was at Kimball Junction, where the Victory turned to the southeast over the old Heber to Fort Duchesne trail that led past Heber City, over Daniel's Pass, and along the north side of Strawberry Reservoir to Million dollar pass. From this point east into the town of Duchesne, the highway followed the same path as the Dominguez-Escalate party of 1776. Since they were being escorted by a Ute boy this is assumed to have been a quite well known native path. From the pass leaving Strawberry Reservoir, the road followed Deep Creek canyon to Current creek junction. Crossing over Current creek the road turned north-east and through the town of Fruitland then east until crossing Red Creek, across an elevated plane and into Rabbit Gulch. Proceeding due east across a broad valley and crossing the Strawberry river at Starvation flats. The road continued due east leaving Starvation flat over a sandstone laden ridge three miles west of city of Duchesne. Continuing East through Duchesne and over the 1910 bridge, past the convergence of the Strawberry and Duchesne rivers, the road continued on the North side of the Duchesne river until crossing over the Duchesne river at Bridgeland. The road then continues on to Myton before crossing the Duchesne River, continues north over the Myton bench then east into Roosevelt, then East into Fort Duchesne. The highway continued north-east across a relatively flat area through Vernal then south-east to Colorado.

Between 1931 and 1938 the entire length of Highway 40 was improved from gravel to oiled or asphalt.

The old Lincoln Highway east of Kimball Junction was initially US 530, but in the late 1930s it became part of US 189. The split between US 40 and US 189, formerly the junction of the Victory and Lincoln Highways, was moved east from Kimball Junction to Silver Creek Junction in 1952; this change moved both routes to a new road between Keetley Junction and Silver Creek Junction, and renumbered the road between Kimball and Silver Creek Junctions from US-189 to US-40. The old road between Keetley and Kimball Junctions became State Route 248. In 1974, with its replacement - Interstate 80 - almost complete across California, Nevada, and Utah, the three states applied to AASHO to truncate US-40 to Silver Creek Junction. (US 40 had been removed west of Truckee, California in 1964.) AASHO approved the truncation on June 17, 1975.

In 1972 with the completion of Starvation Reservoir in Duchesne County a new route was built from mile marker 88 west of the new reservoir to the newly completed Freedom bridge, bypassing Starvation Flats and into Duchesne City. The old route is now mostly under Starvation Reservoir and the rest is designated as Utah State Route 311. East of Duchesne the new road was moved south of the river along the southern bench, bypassing Bridgeland and into Myton.

In 1953 a new bridge was built over the Duchesne river just west of Myton. The old route along Main and Sixth Street across the old bridge became State Route 252 in 1953. It was given to the city in 1969.

== Major intersections ==
County	Location	mi	km	Exit	Destinations	Notes
Summit	Silver Creek Junction	0.000	0.000		I-80 west – Salt Lake City	Western terminus of US 40
Summit	Silver Creek Junction	0.000	0.000	1	I-80 east (US-189 north) / Silver Creek Road – Cheyenne	Westbound exit and eastbound entrance; west end of unsigned US-189 overlap
Summit		1.309	2.107	2	Silver Summit	
Summit		3.998	6.434	4	SR-248 – Park City, Kamas	
Wasatch		8.246	13.271	8	Mayflower (SR-319)	
Wasatch		13.033	20.975	East end of freeway		
Wasatch		13.248	21.321		SR-32 – Francis, Kamas, Midway	
Wasatch	Heber City	17.006	27.369		SR-113 (100 South) – Midway	
Wasatch	Heber City	17.945	28.880		US 189 south – Orem, Provo	East end of US-189 overlap
Duchesne		68.247	109.833		SR-208 – Tabiona	
Duchesne	Duchesne	85.931	138.293		SR-311 – Fred Hayes State Park at Starvation	
Duchesne	Duchesne	86.434	139.102		US 191 south (100 West) – Price, Green River	West end of US-191 overlap
Duchesne	Duchesne	86.524	139.247		SR-87 (Center Street) – Altamont	
Duchesne		109.538	176.284		SR-87 – Ioka, Altamont	
Duchesne	Roosevelt	114.576	184.392		SR-121 (200 North) – Neola	
Uintah		130.450	209.939		SR-88 – Ouray	
Uintah	Vernal	143.787	231.403		SR-121 (500 West) – Maeser	
Uintah	Vernal	144.285	232.204		US 191 north (Vernal Avenue) – Flaming Gorge, Rock Springs	East end of US-191 overlap
Uintah	Naples	148.242	238.572		SR-45 – Bonanza	
Uintah		157.109	252.842		SR-149 – Dinosaur National Monument	
Uintah		174.624	281.030		US 40 east – Craig, Denver	Continuation into Colorado
1.000 mi = 1.609 km; 1.000 km = 0.621 mi: Concurrency terminus

== See also ==
- List of U.S. Highways in Utah

U.S. Route 40
Previous state: Terminus	Utah	Next state: Colorado
