= Boneta, Utah =

Unincorporated community in the state of Utah, United States

Coordinates: 40°21′35″N 110°20′30″W

Boneta is an unincorporated community in east-central Duchesne County, Utah, United States.

== History ==
A post office called Boneta was established in 1908, and remained in operation until 1960. The community's name is derived from the first child death in the community, her named being Boneta.
