= Myton, Utah =

City in Utah, United States

- City
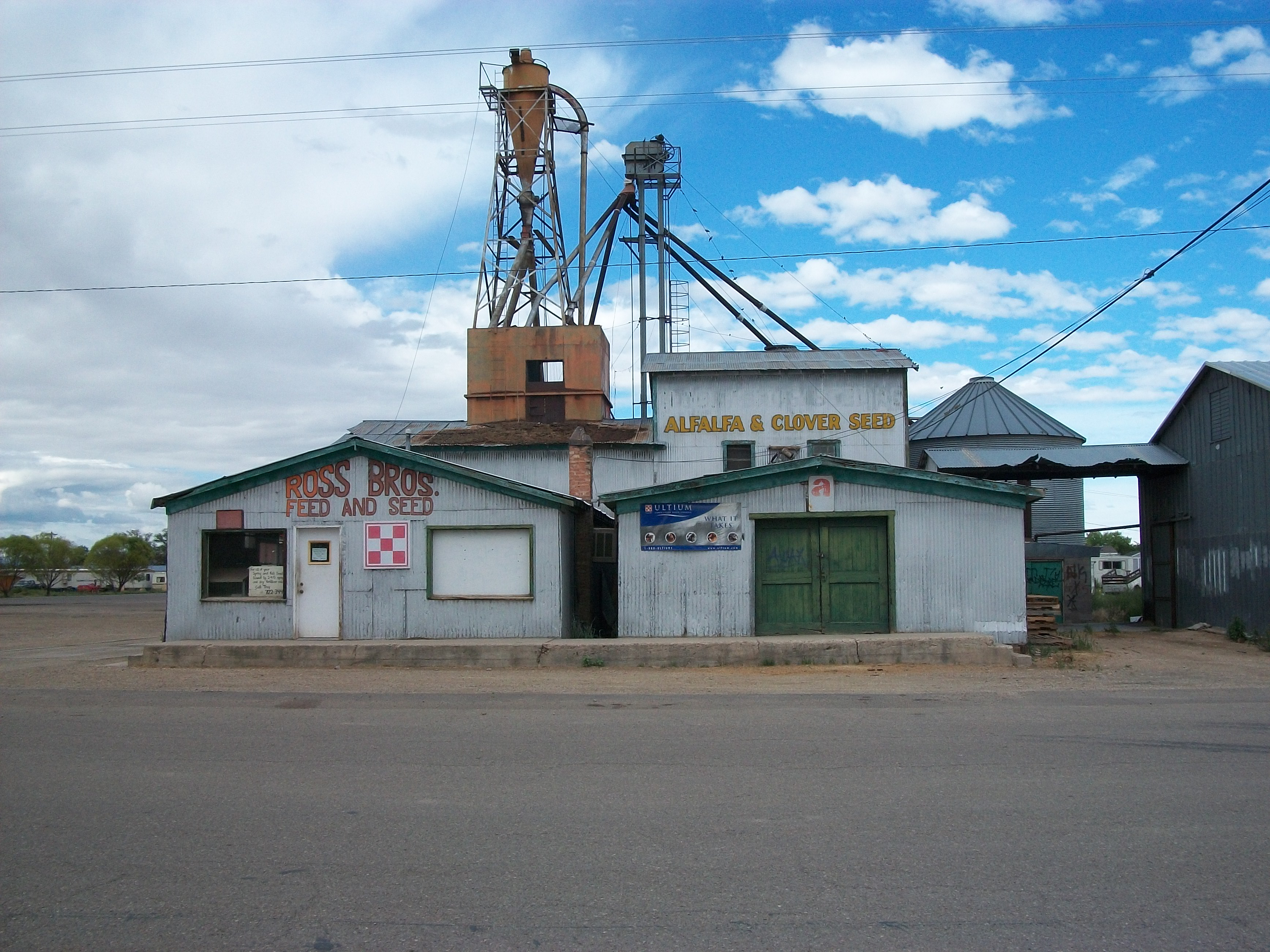
- Agricultural building in Myton

- Location in Duchesne County and the state of Utah
- Coordinates: 40°11′47″N 110°3′51″W
- Country: United States
- State: Utah
- County: Duchesne
- Named for: Howell P. Myton

Area
  - Total: 1.01 sq mi (2.61 km^{2})
  - Land: 1.01 sq mi (2.61 km^{2})
  - Water: 0 sq mi (0.00 km^{2})
- Elevation: 5,086 ft (1,550 m)

Population (2020)
  - Total: 561
  - Density: 600.7/sq mi (231.95/km^{2})
- Time zone: UTC-7 (Mountain (MST))
  - Summer (DST): UTC-6 (MDT)
- ZIP code: 84052
- Area code: 435
- FIPS code: 49-53340
- GNIS feature ID: 2411206
- Website: mytoncityut.gov

Myton is a city in Duchesne County, Utah, United States. Established in 1905, Myton had a population of 561 at the 2020 census.

== Geography ==
Myton is located in eastern Duchesne County along U.S. Routes 40 and 191. Duchesne, the county seat, is 19 miles (31 km) to the west, and Roosevelt, the largest city by population in Duchesne County, is 10 miles (16 km) to the northeast.

According to the United States Census Bureau, the city has a total area of 1.0 square mile (2.6 km^{2}), all land. Myton is on the south side of the Duchesne River, an east-flowing tributary of the Green River.

=== Climate ===
According to the Köppen Climate Classification system, Myton has a semi-arid climate, abbreviated BSk on climate maps.

In 1974, Myton recorded a mere 1.34 inches or 34.0 millimetres of precipitation for the entire year, the record lowest for a calendar year in Utah, and the second-lowest figure ever recorded in the U.S. outside the southwestern deserts. (Note: In 1960, Lysite, Wyoming recorded only 1.28 inches or 32.5 millimetres for the year.)

Climate data for Myton, Utah, 1991–2020 normals, extremes 1918–present
| Month | Jan | Feb | Mar | Apr | May | Jun | Jul | Aug | Sep | Oct | Nov | Dec | Year |
|---|---|---|---|---|---|---|---|---|---|---|---|---|---|
| Record high °F (°C) | 62 (17) | 70 (21) | 79 (26) | 88 (31) | 100 (38) | 102 (39) | 104 (40) | 103 (39) | 99 (37) | 86 (30) | 73 (23) | 68 (20) | 104 (40) |
| Mean maximum °F (°C) | 44.6 (7.0) | 54.6 (12.6) | 70.4 (21.3) | 80.4 (26.9) | 87.6 (30.9) | 95.3 (35.2) | 98.5 (36.9) | 96.1 (35.6) | 91.1 (32.8) | 79.7 (26.5) | 62.5 (16.9) | 49.8 (9.9) | 99.2 (37.3) |
| Mean daily maximum °F (°C) | 31.1 (−0.5) | 39.9 (4.4) | 55.2 (12.9) | 64.7 (18.2) | 73.7 (23.2) | 85.1 (29.5) | 91.3 (32.9) | 88.4 (31.3) | 79.6 (26.4) | 65.3 (18.5) | 49.5 (9.7) | 34.4 (1.3) | 63.2 (17.3) |
| Daily mean °F (°C) | 18.9 (−7.3) | 27.0 (−2.8) | 40.4 (4.7) | 48.9 (9.4) | 57.8 (14.3) | 67.5 (19.7) | 74.1 (23.4) | 71.8 (22.1) | 62.7 (17.1) | 49.7 (9.8) | 35.4 (1.9) | 22.4 (−5.3) | 48.1 (8.9) |
| Mean daily minimum °F (°C) | 6.6 (−14.1) | 14.1 (−9.9) | 25.5 (−3.6) | 33.0 (0.6) | 42.0 (5.6) | 49.8 (9.9) | 56.8 (13.8) | 55.2 (12.9) | 45.8 (7.7) | 34.0 (1.1) | 21.3 (−5.9) | 10.5 (−11.9) | 32.9 (0.5) |
| Mean minimum °F (°C) | −7.6 (−22.0) | −1.6 (−18.7) | 12.6 (−10.8) | 19.4 (−7.0) | 29.0 (−1.7) | 37.6 (3.1) | 46.6 (8.1) | 45.6 (7.6) | 32.8 (0.4) | 20.0 (−6.7) | 7.8 (−13.4) | −5.0 (−20.6) | −10.9 (−23.8) |
| Record low °F (°C) | −39 (−39) | −39 (−39) | −15 (−26) | 1 (−17) | 17 (−8) | 26 (−3) | 32 (0) | 34 (1) | 22 (−6) | 0 (−18) | −13 (−25) | −34 (−37) | −39 (−39) |
| Average precipitation inches (mm) | 0.35 (8.9) | 0.41 (10) | 0.32 (8.1) | 0.61 (15) | 0.95 (24) | 0.53 (13) | 0.37 (9.4) | 0.60 (15) | 1.10 (28) | 0.83 (21) | 0.42 (11) | 0.46 (12) | 6.95 (177) |
| Average precipitation days (≥ 0.01 in) | 2.4 | 2.1 | 1.6 | 2.8 | 4.5 | 2.6 | 2.8 | 4.2 | 4.2 | 3.1 | 2.3 | 2.5 | 35.1 |
Source: NOAA

== Demographics ==
Historical population
| Census | Pop. | Note | %± |
|---|---|---|---|
| 1910 | 1,049 | | — |
| 1920 | 479 | | −54.3% |
| 1930 | 395 | | −17.5% |
| 1940 | 437 | | 10.6% |
| 1950 | 435 | | −0.5% |
| 1960 | 329 | | −24.4% |
| 1970 | 322 | | −2.1% |
| 1980 | 500 | | 55.3% |
| 1990 | 468 | | −6.4% |
| 2000 | 539 | | 15.2% |
| 2010 | 569 | | 5.6% |
| 2020 | 561 | | −1.4% |
U.S. Decennial Census

=== 2020 census ===
As of the 2020 census, the city had a population of 561. The median age was 34.7 years, 30.7% of residents were under the age of 18, and 16.2% of residents were 65 years of age or older. For every 100 females there were 99.6 males, and for every 100 females age 18 and over there were 93.5 males age 18 and over.

0.0% of residents lived in urban areas, while 100.0% lived in rural areas.

There were 202 households in the city, of which 42.6% had children under the age of 18 living in them. Of all households, 42.1% were married-couple households, 23.3% were households with a male householder and no spouse or partner present, and 30.2% were households with a female householder and no spouse or partner present. About 21.3% of all households were made up of individuals and 6.0% had someone living alone who was 65 years of age or older.

There were 264 housing units, of which 23.5% were vacant. The homeowner vacancy rate was 2.8% and the rental vacancy rate was 25.3%.

Racial composition as of the 2020 census
| Race | Number | Percent |
|---|---|---|
| White | 448 | 79.9% |
| Black or African American | 0 | 0.0% |
| American Indian and Alaska Native | 47 | 8.4% |
| Asian | 0 | 0.0% |
| Native Hawaiian and Other Pacific Islander | 1 | 0.2% |
| Some other race | 33 | 5.9% |
| Two or more races | 32 | 5.7% |
| Hispanic or Latino (of any race) | 55 | 9.8% |

=== 2000 census ===
As of the 2000 census, there were 539 people, 163 households, and 131 families residing in the city. The population density was 536.2 people per square mile (206.0/km^{2}). There were 189 housing units at an average density of 188.0 per square mile (72.3/km^{2}). The racial makeup of the city was 77.55% White, 11.13% Native American, 0.74% Asian, 7.61% from other races, and 2.97% from two or more races. Hispanic or Latino of any race were 12.62% of the population.

There were 163 households, out of which 48.5% had children under the age of 18 living with them, 59.5% were married couples living together, 14.7% had a female householder with no husband present, and 19.6% were non-families. 14.7% of all households were made up of individuals, and 3.7% had someone living alone who was 65 years of age or older. The average household size was 3.31 and the average family size was 3.68.

In the city, the population was spread out, with 37.8% under the age of 18, 12.2% from 18 to 24, 23.6% from 25 to 44, 18.9% from 45 to 64, and 7.4% who were 65 years of age or older. The median age was 25 years. For every 100 females, there were 97.4 males. For every 100 females age 18 and over, there were 92.5 males.

The median income for a household in the city was $23,472, and the median income for a family was $25,500. Males had a median income of $26,500 versus $32,917 for females. The per capita income for the city was $8,678. About 32.6% of families and 38.4% of the population were below the poverty line, including 48.5% of those under age 18 and 8.9% of those age 65 or over.
