= Utahn, Utah =

Unincorporated community in Duchesne County, Utah, United States

Utahn
- Unincorporated Community
- Location of Utahn within the State of Utah Location of Utahn within the United States
- Coordinates: 40°16′16″N 110°25′56″W
- Country: United States
- State: Utah
- County: Duchesne
- Settled: 1905
- Elevation: 5,870 ft (1,790 m)
- GNIS feature ID: 1437710

Utahn is an unincorporated community and near-ghost town in Duchesne County, Utah, United States.
