= Altamont, Utah =

Town in the Duchesne County, Utah, United States

Altamont
- Town
- Location in Duchesne County and the state of Utah

- Location within Utah Location within the United States
- Coordinates: 40°21′32″N 110°17′17″W
- Country: United States
- State: Utah
- County: Duchesne
- Settled: 1930s
- Incorporated: 1953
- Named after: Altonah and Mount Emmons

Area
  - Total: 0.21 sq mi (0.55 km^{2})
  - Land: 0.21 sq mi (0.55 km^{2})
  - Water: 0 sq mi (0.00 km^{2})
- Elevation: 6,391 ft (1,948 m)

Population (2020)
  - Total: 239
  - Density: 1,306.9/sq mi (504.58/km^{2})
- Time zone: UTC-7 (MST)
  - Summer (DST): UTC-6 (MDT)
- ZIP code: 84001
- Area code: 435
- FIPS code: 49-00760
- GNIS feature ID: 2412355
- Website: altamontutah.gov

Altamont is a town in Duchesne County, Utah, United States. The population was 239 at the 2020 census, an increase over the 2010 figure of 225.

== History ==
The town was founded in 1935 around a new high school. The school was finished in 1935. A contest was held to name the school, and the winner was 10th-grade-boy Clarence Snyder. He created the portmanteau of Altamont, combining the names of the nearby villages of Altonah and Mount Emmons. The community grew gradually and, in May 1953, petitioned to incorporate as a town in 1953.

== Geography ==
According to the United States Census Bureau, the town has a total area of 0.2 square mile (0.4 km^{2}), all land.

=== Climate ===
Altamont has a cold semi-arid climate (Köppen BSk) with cold winters and warm summers.

Climate data for Altamont, Utah, 1991–2020 normals, extremes 1948–present
Month	Jan	Feb	Mar	Apr	May	Jun	Jul	Aug	Sep	Oct	Nov	Dec	Year
Record high °F (°C)	59 (15)	69 (21)	76 (24)	86 (30)	90 (32)	98 (37)	97 (36)	95 (35)	90 (32)	80 (27)	69 (21)	64 (18)	98 (37)
Mean maximum °F (°C)	43.7 (6.5)	50.4 (10.2)	64.1 (17.8)	73.3 (22.9)	80.6 (27.0)	88.1 (31.2)	92.1 (33.4)	89.8 (32.1)	84.4 (29.1)	73.1 (22.8)	58.4 (14.7)	46.6 (8.1)	92.7 (33.7)
Mean daily maximum °F (°C)	28.9 (−1.7)	34.8 (1.6)	47.0 (8.3)	55.1 (12.8)	64.2 (17.9)	75.1 (23.9)	82.4 (28.0)	80.1 (26.7)	71.0 (21.7)	57.4 (14.1)	42.6 (5.9)	29.4 (−1.4)	55.7 (13.2)
Daily mean °F (°C)	17.8 (−7.9)	23.1 (−4.9)	33.9 (1.1)	41.1 (5.1)	50.2 (10.1)	59.5 (15.3)	66.9 (19.4)	65.0 (18.3)	56.1 (13.4)	43.6 (6.4)	30.5 (−0.8)	18.9 (−7.3)	42.2 (5.7)
Mean daily minimum °F (°C)	6.7 (−14.1)	11.5 (−11.4)	20.9 (−6.2)	27.2 (−2.7)	36.2 (2.3)	44.0 (6.7)	51.5 (10.8)	49.9 (9.9)	41.2 (5.1)	29.9 (−1.2)	18.4 (−7.6)	8.4 (−13.1)	28.8 (−1.8)
Mean minimum °F (°C)	−7.1 (−21.7)	−2.9 (−19.4)	8.5 (−13.1)	16.0 (−8.9)	25.3 (−3.7)	33.8 (1.0)	44.2 (6.8)	42.5 (5.8)	30.8 (−0.7)	17.8 (−7.9)	5.8 (−14.6)	−5.2 (−20.7)	−10.5 (−23.6)
Record low °F (°C)	−30 (−34)	−32 (−36)	−11 (−24)	5 (−15)	16 (−9)	25 (−4)	34 (1)	28 (−2)	19 (−7)	−6 (−21)	−8 (−22)	−32 (−36)	−32 (−36)
Average precipitation inches (mm)	0.69 (18)	0.62 (16)	0.53 (13)	0.83 (21)	1.08 (27)	0.77 (20)	0.60 (15)	0.96 (24)	1.24 (31)	0.99 (25)	0.51 (13)	0.62 (16)	9.44 (240)
Average snowfall inches (cm)	10.8 (27)	7.5 (19)	3.0 (7.6)	3.2 (8.1)	0.1 (0.25)	0.0 (0.0)	0.0 (0.0)	0.0 (0.0)	0.1 (0.25)	0.8 (2.0)	4.2 (11)	9.0 (23)	38.7 (98)
Average precipitation days (≥ 0.01 in)	4.7	4.9	4.0	5.2	6.7	4.8	5.2	6.6	5.9	5.1	4.2	4.6	61.9
Average snowy days (≥ 0.1 in)	4.3	4.0	1.9	1.4	0.1	0.0	0.0	0.0	0.0	0.5	2.2	4.3	18.7
Source: NOAA

== Demographics ==
Historical population
Census	Pop.	Note	%±
1960	102		—
1970	129		26.5%
1980	247		91.5%
1990	167		−32.4%
2000	178		6.6%
2010	225		26.4%
2020	239		6.2%
U.S. Decennial Census

As of the census of 2010, there were 225 people in 83 households in the town. The racial makeup of the town was 96% White, 2% Native American, and 1.3% from Hispanic or Latino.

The population was 46 percent male and 54 percent female. The population was 31.6 percent under 18 and 12.9 percent 65 or over.

== Education ==
The town schools are Altamont High School and Altamont Elementary School. The high school mascot is Louie the Longhorn, and its colors are red and blue. Altamont High School teaches grades 7-12, and is a 1A school that has local rivalries with Duchesne and Tabiona.

== See also ==
- List of municipalities in Utah
