= Duchesne, Utah =

City in and county seat of Duchesne County, Utah, United States

- City
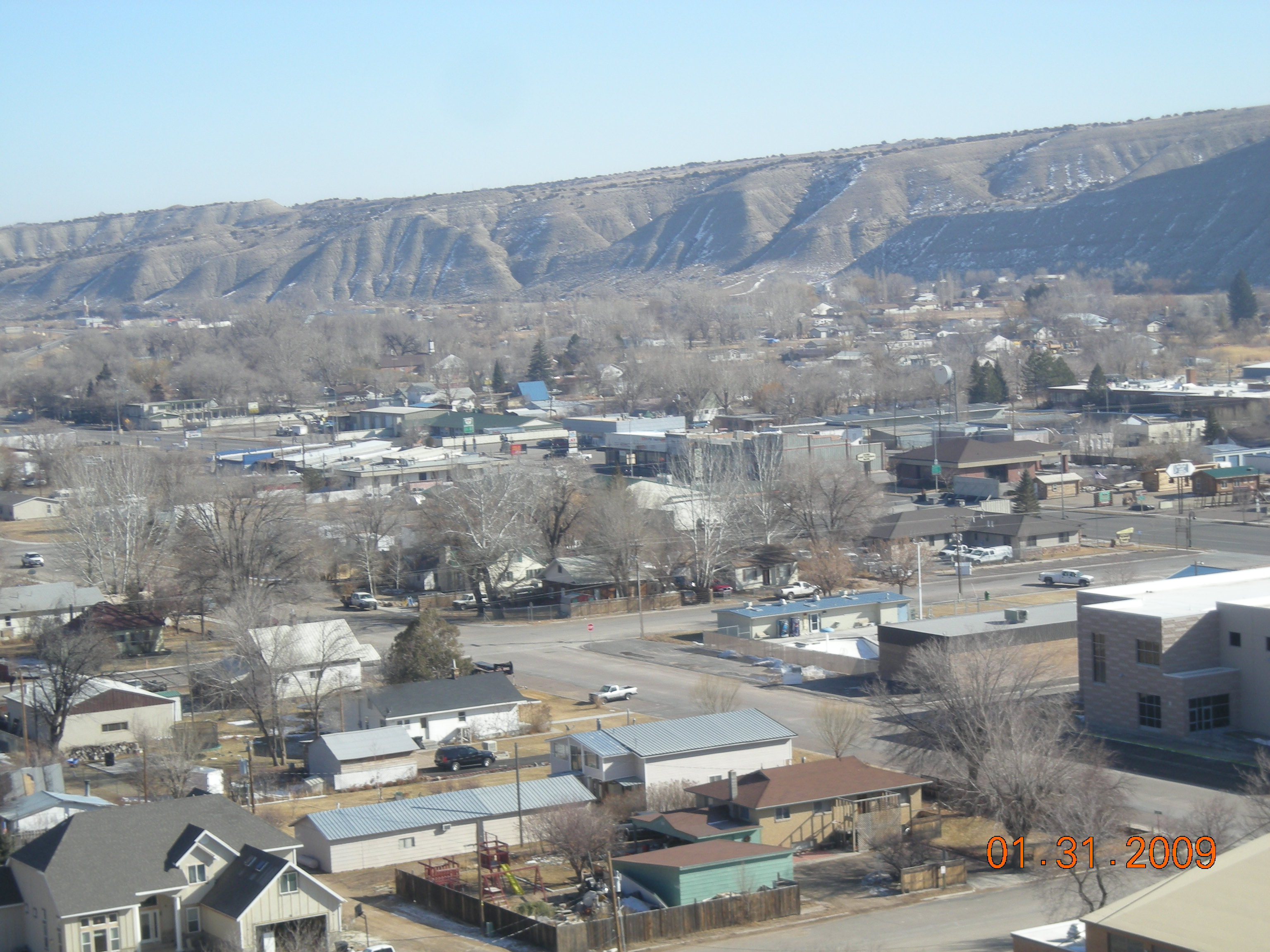
- Looking southeast and down on Duchesne, January 2009

- logo
- Motto: Gateway to the Uinta Basin
- Location in Duchesne County and the state of Utah
- Coordinates: 40°11′12″N 110°22′52″W
- Country: United States
- State: Utah
- County: Duchesne
- Settled: 1905
- Named for: Duchesne River

Government
  - Type: Strong Mayor-Council

Area
  - Total: 2.80 sq mi (7.26 km^{2})
  - Land: 2.80 sq mi (7.26 km^{2})
  - Water: 0 sq mi (0.00 km^{2})
- Elevation: 5,712 ft (1,741 m)

Population (2020)
  - Total: 1,588
  - Density: 600/sq mi (230/km^{2})
- Time zone: UTC−7 (Mountain (MST))
  - Summer (DST): UTC−6 (MDT)
- ZIP code: 84021
- Area code: 435
- FIPS code: 49-20340
- GNIS feature ID: 2410365
- Website: duchesnecityut.gov

Duchesne (/duːˈʃeɪn/ doo-SHAYN) is a city in and the county seat of Duchesne County, Utah, United States. The population was 1,588 at the 2020 census.

== History ==
18 September 1776 The Dominguez–Escalante Expedition came from the east where they crossed Blue Bench and descended into the valley north of the present-day town of Duchesne. "We ascended a not very high mesa [Blue Bench] which was level and very stony, traveled about three-quarters of a league including ascent and descent, crossed another small river [Duchesne River] which near here enters the San Cosme (Strawberry River), named it Santa Caterina de Sena, and camped on its banks." "Along these three rivers we have crossed today, there is plenty of good land for crops to support three good settlements, with opportunities for irrigation, beautiful cottonwood groves, good pastures, timber, and firewood nearby."

1822–1840 French Canadian trappers Étienne Provost, François le Clerc, and Antoine Robidoux entered the Uintah Basin by way of the Old Spanish Trail and made their fortunes by trapping the many beaver and trading with the Uintah tribe. From these French Canadian trappers, the Duchesne River and ultimately Duchesne City received its name.

1900–1905 Leases were arranged with the Ute tribe through the Indian agent "Major" H.P. Myton to provide pasture for sheep in and around where Duchesne city is located now. A story passed down from Mrs. William J. Bond about her Father Joseph W. Thomas discusses the area. "During the winter of 1901 - 02, he (Thomas) hauled supplies from Heber to the now Duchesne area, to the sheep herd camp of John E. Austin, a brother-in-law. Together with three herders, Mr. Thomas tended sheep on the West bench (D-hill) near the (Theodore) cemetery site. They moved the herds to the East desert for the winter months. The Indians had quite a village where Duchesne is now. It was a winter camp, and in spring, they scattered.

A fence was stretched across the Indian Canyon as pasture for the horses grazed there on 8" and 10" salt grass. Seguesee Jack (Ute tribe leader) refused settlers (sheep herders) permission to trespass the village site. The Indians feared the sheep would eat the good grasses."

1905–1906 On 7 June 1905, the Secretary of the Interior directed the Commissioner of Indian Affairs to select one or more tracts of land in the Uintah Reservation suitable for townsites, so they might be reserved as such under the statutes of the United States. Three sites were designated, which are the current sites of Duchesne, Myton, and Randlett. A month later, President Theodore Roosevelt approved the selections and declared these lands reserved as townsites. On 28 August, the US government opened up the Uintah Basin to settle land they had acquired from the Ute Indians under the allotment act of 1891. "Land lotteries" were held in Vernal, Provo, Price, Grand Junction, Colorado, and Vernal, where each person was given a ticket with a number. On 28 August, 1 through 111 was allowed to make their claim. On 29 August, the next 111 people could make their claims. Sixty people, 46 adults and 14 children, settled on the townsite that is now Duchesne and called it by its first name, "Elsie" (Glen). Government surveyors laid out the streets, and the government accepted the survey on 18 October 1905. The first cabin was built by Charles Dickerson and Charles Ragland in October 1905. A.M. Murdock, with the help of a few men, put up a large circus tent to act as a trading post and post office. The town's name was changed to "Dora" for a short time after Murdock's 23-year-old daughter, then changed once again to "Theodore", in honor of President Theodore Roosevelt. On 15 September 1905, Robert Duchesne Marsh was the first "white" child born in the townsite. The first winter was harsh, and the residents lived in tents or other temporary shelters. When spring came, the high water of the Duchesne River overflowed its banks, flooding the town. Many homesteaders' dreams died after the first winter, and they sold their claims off for next to nothing. Judge M. M. Smith recalls, "One man asked me to write out a relinquishment for him, remarking, 'I must either give up my claim or my wife. She won't live here.'" Dikes were quickly built up but washed away, and some of the town was under 2 feet (0.61 m) of water until June. Tents and houses were moved around to avoid the flooding problem before the next spring.

The flooding continued annually until 1910 when $5,000 was finally given to make the four river cut-offs needed to fix the problem. In 1906 the first bridge was built by Wasatch County across the Duchesne River in east Theodore.

1907–1914 The men of Theodore organized the Boosters Club, and the women organized the Standard Bearers in 1907. Both groups became a forceful factor in the early development of the town. With the flooding of the rivers every spring, the Boosters club was finding it hard to attract people and business to the "muddy" little town. The Boosters Club raised $500 to build a bridge across the Strawberry River at the mouth of Indian Canyon. The bridge was completed in 1908 and later replaced by the state in 1914. In 1908 A. M. Murdock took down the tent and built the first store, barber shop, and post office, the "Pioneer Supply". The citizens built a town hall in 1907. After the flooding issue was resolved, the town grew quickly. In 1910 the population of "Theodore" was 929. The town's first newspaper, The Duchesne Record, started publication 8 April 1909. By 1910 the citizens had decided to change the name to "Duchesne". The post office kept the name "Theodore" until the town's petition to change the name was acknowledged on 5 May 1911. The town was incorporated in 1913, and A. M. Murdock was the first mayor.

On 13 July 1914, "Wasatch County was divided, and Duchesne County was created." Duchesne was made the county seat on 5 Nov 1914 by the popular vote of the county's citizens.

The name "Duchesne" is taken from the name of the river that runs through town and may have been named by fur trappers in the 1820s in honor of Mother Rose Philippine Duchesne, founder of the School of the Sacred Heart near St. Louis, Missouri, although other theories as to the name exist.

A photograph dated 1909, showing the A. M. Murdock Pioneer Supply Store and post office at Theodore, Utah (which was located approximately where Kohl's Market stood in Duchesne in 1991) appeared in a postal history magazine in 1992. The Theodore post office operated from 1905 through 1913, when it was renamed Duchesne.

== Geography ==
Duchesne is located just west of the junction of the Strawberry and Duchesne rivers in the Uintah Basin of northeastern Utah. The Duchesne River drains the southwest slope of the Uinta Mountains, and the Strawberry river drains the eastern slopes of the Wasatch Range and is connected to Strawberry Reservoir. The two rivers combine at Duchesne, and the Duchesne River continues east to join the Green River at Ouray, Utah.

Native stands of cottonwood trees and willows grow along the river banks, while sagebrush and rabbitbrush fill the unirrigated bench tops. Alfalfa is the main cultivated crop of farmers in the area.

Via highway, Salt Lake City is 114 miles (183 km) to the west, Vernal is 58 miles (93 km) to the east, and Price is 54 miles (87 km) to the south.

According to the United States Census Bureau, the city has a total area of 2.5 square miles (6.5 km^{2}), all land.

=== Climate ===
Duchesne has a cold semi-arid climate (Köppen climate classification BSk).

Climate data for Duchesne, Utah, 1991–2020 normals, extremes 1906–present
Month	Jan	Feb	Mar	Apr	May	Jun	Jul	Aug	Sep	Oct	Nov	Dec	Year
Record high °F (°C)	61 (16)	73 (23)	87 (31)	84 (29)	93 (34)	99 (37)	101 (38)	101 (38)	97 (36)	85 (29)	73 (23)	63 (17)	101 (38)
Mean daily maximum °F (°C)	33.4 (0.8)	41.1 (5.1)	55.2 (12.9)	63.3 (17.4)	72.5 (22.5)	83.1 (28.4)	88.5 (31.4)	85.5 (29.7)	77.1 (25.1)	63.8 (17.7)	48.3 (9.1)	34.8 (1.6)	62.2 (16.8)
Daily mean °F (°C)	21.9 (−5.6)	29.1 (−1.6)	41.1 (5.1)	48.5 (9.2)	57.4 (14.1)	66.3 (19.1)	72.4 (22.4)	70.1 (21.2)	61.6 (16.4)	49.3 (9.6)	35.8 (2.1)	23.9 (−4.5)	48.1 (9.0)
Mean daily minimum °F (°C)	10.5 (−11.9)	17.0 (−8.3)	26.9 (−2.8)	33.7 (0.9)	42.2 (5.7)	49.5 (9.7)	56.3 (13.5)	54.6 (12.6)	46.2 (7.9)	34.7 (1.5)	23.3 (−4.8)	13.0 (−10.6)	34.0 (1.1)
Record low °F (°C)	−43 (−42)	−40 (−40)	−16 (−27)	4 (−16)	15 (−9)	25 (−4)	35 (2)	26 (−3)	16 (−9)	3 (−16)	−17 (−27)	−39 (−39)	−43 (−42)
Average precipitation inches (mm)	0.54 (14)	0.51 (13)	0.63 (16)	0.80 (20)	1.04 (26)	0.67 (17)	0.78 (20)	1.35 (34)	1.18 (30)	0.93 (24)	0.49 (12)	0.53 (13)	9.45 (239)
Average snowfall inches (cm)	7.2 (18)	5.9 (15)	2.8 (7.1)	1.6 (4.1)	0.2 (0.51)	0.0 (0.0)	0.0 (0.0)	0.0 (0.0)	0.0 (0.0)	0.6 (1.5)	2.9 (7.4)	7.9 (20)	29.1 (73.61)
Average precipitation days (≥ 0.01 in)	5.1	5.2	4.2	5.8	6.6	4.9	6.3	8.3	6.5	5.6	3.9	4.6	67.0
Average snowy days (≥ 0.1 in)	4.6	4.0	1.5	1.1	0.0	0.0	0.0	0.0	0.0	0.6	1.8	4.0	17.6
Source 1: NOAA
Source 2: National Weather Service

== Amenities ==
- Duchesne Library
- Swimming pool
- Skate park
- Two community parks, which include slides, swings, picnic tables, a football field, and baseball diamonds
- Boardwalk along the Strawberry River, with a great view of surrounding scenery
- Ice skating pond, seasonal and located behind the library
- Duchesne County Fair Grounds with covered rodeo arena
- Duchesne County Centennial Event Center, 2000 seat indoor arena, multiple conference rooms with seating up to 300

== Recreation ==
Four miles to the west of Duchesne city is Fred Hayes State Park at Starvation. Starvation Reservoir is the base of the state park. Located on the Strawberry River, it was created as part of the Central Utah Project and is great fishing and boating lake with stocks of rainbow trout, smallmouth bass, walleye, yellow perch, and Utah chub. The current catch and release state record for walleye and Utah chub are held at Starvation. The reservoir has 3,500 acres (14 km^{2}) of surface area and is great for boating. There are four boat ramps; the largest is at the marina, which also hosts RV parking, boat docs, campsites, hot showers, and an RV waste dump. Activities at Starvation Reservoir include the annual Starvation Walleye Classic and Desert Bass Busters Club Tourny.

The High Uintas wilderness area is 30 miles (48 km) to the north and boasts great camping, hiking, and fishing.

Duchesne sits at the junction of three wildlife management units and is home to world-class big game hunting. Mule deer, pronghorn antelope, elk, moose, bighorn sheep, mountain goat, black bear, and mountain lion can be observed within miles of town.

== Transportation ==
Duchesne sits at the junction of U.S. Route 40, U.S. Route 191, and State Route 87. US-191 from Duchesne to Helper is designated the Indian Canyon National Scenic Byway.

Duchesne Municipal Airport (Airnav U69) is located 2 miles (3 km) northeast of the town on the Blue Bench. The airport has a 5,800 by 60 ft (1,768 by 18 m) asphalt runway. Runway edge lights are medium intensity available from dusk - dawn, activate MIRL RY 17/35 & PAPI 17/35 - CTAF. Wind indicator is lit. Attendance is ON CALL. Services are available by request (435) 738-2464 from 9:00 am to 5:00 pm Mon - Fri; after hours call (435) 738–5538.

The proposed Uinta Basin Rail project would build a new railroad line into Duchesne for transporting oil drilled in the area.

== Points of interest ==
- Grave of William Long, aka Harry Longabaugh, aka "the Sundance Kid". Research is underway that may prove that the Sundance Kid did not die in Bolivia in 1908 but returned to his family in Utah and bought and operated a farm 2 miles (3 km) east of Duchesne until his death in 1936. He is buried in the Duchesne City cemetery.
- Pope Museum: Home of Duchesne pioneers Fred and Marie Pope. The museum contains miniature, true-to-scale vehicles that depict the lifestyle of the early settlers of the Uintah Basin. The museum is located at 370 West 100 North.
- Theodore Cemetery: Early pioneer cemetery that functioned from 1906 until January 1914. John Jacobs was the first burial. Forty-one early settlers are buried here. The cemetery was abandoned because of the difficulty of digging graves in the cobblestone-laden soil. The cemetery was recently restored, and a large monument with names and information is located on the north end of the cemetery. Located on "D" hill, take the dirt road on the west end of town up the hill and turn east at the top. Travel east 300 yards to the monument.
- Father Escalante Monument: North of Highway 40 on the east entrance of town
- Early Duchesne Settlement Monument: 130 West Main on the north side of the road
- War Memorial, World War I monument, World War II monument, Korean War monument, Vietnam War monument, Desert Storm monument: all located at 150 West Main.
- Saint Rose Philippine Duchesne Monument: by the front entrance of the Pope Museum.

== Schools ==
It is within the Duchesne County School District.

Duchesne has one public elementary school and one public high school. The schools serve all of Duchesne City as well as the communities of Bridgeland, Utahn, Strawberry, and Fruitland. Duchesne has hosted grades 1 through 8 since 1905. The first school building was built in 1907. In 1921 ninth grade classes were added. Other classes on the 10th-grade level were added through the late 1920s. On May 17, 1931, Duchesne High School held a graduation ceremony for four students that composed the first senior class. The current structure was built in 2004–2005. The facility has two gymnasiums, one college-sized basketball court, and one smaller gymnasium left from the 1965 structure. English department with classrooms and a separate writing lab. Science department with classrooms and separate lab. Utah State University provides onsite distance education classes at the school, so all students have the opportunity to graduate from high school with an associate degree. Wood and metal shops. Auditorium, lunch room, and administrative offices.

Duchesne High school colors are blue and white; the mascot is the eagle. Duchesne High School sponsors a men's football team, men's and women's basketball teams, men's wrestling, women's volleyball, as well as a track and field team and cross country team. Duchesne added men's baseball in the 2017–18 school year. Duchesne High competes in the 2A division of the UHSAA in all activities, but Football competes in 1A. Men's teams have won state titles in boys basketball (1989), football (2006, 2010, 2011, 2012, 2013,2016), wrestling (1981, 2008, 2015), boys cross country (1994, 1998), and boys track and field (1993, 2004, 2005). The women's drill team named the Talons has won fifteen (2004–2018) consecutive state championships.

- Duchesne Elementary serves grades K–6.
- Duchesne High School serves grades 7–12.

== Churches ==
Three organized churches serve Duchesne city and the surrounding area.

- The Church of Jesus Christ of Latter-day Saints has two chapels located at 130 South 300 East and 901 North 500 East, and a seminary located at 181 North 200 West.
- The First Baptist Church is located at 592 East 400 South.
- The Catholic Church has a small mission office on West Main Street. The Blessed Kateri Tekakwitha mission is under the direction of Saint Helen Parish in Roosevelt, Utah.

== Industry ==
In 1948 oil was found in the Uintah Basin but not developed until the early 1970s. Duchesne city is located in vast oil and natural gas reserves spanning the northeast corner of Utah and extending into western Colorado. As prices for crude rise, oil industry jobs open up in the town but also disappear when crude prices fall. Although reserves are vast, oil production is stifled to almost 50% of capacity by a lack of transportation of the paraffin-rich crude. Currently, crude is only transported to refineries in the Salt Lake City area using trucks. Pipelines can not be used because of the high wax content of the crude. Currently (2019), a study is being conducted on the feasibility of a rail line passing through Duchesne to allow transport of the crude to bigger markets.

Duchesne has benefited from the water resources of the Duchesne and Strawberry rivers that flow close to the town. The Central Utah Project was active in the area for 20 years and provided good jobs from 1967 to 1987. A recent expansion to the water treatment plant northwest of town will start supplying culinary water to the community of Roosevelt some 30 miles (48 km) away.

Duchesne is home to several heavy machines and steel manufacturers. A wide variety of products and parts are manufactured, including underground cranes, shield haulers, rifle barrels, steam locomotive parts, drill collars, turbine parts, gears, sprockets, and splines for the oil fields, steel mills, coal mines, trona mines, power plants, other machine shops, manufacturers and other industries in many capacities. Products are shipped domestically to Canada, Mexico, South America, Australia, and Europe.

Agriculture has always been a mainstay for many Duchesne residents and surrounding communities. The vast amount of federally owned and leased lands have given cattle and sheep ranchers good grazing for over 120 years in the area. Overgrazing in the early 20th century has led to reform in the grazing areas and a steady decline in sheep and cow production throughout the area. Small family farms are the mainstay.

== Population ==
Historical population
Census	Pop.	Note	%±
1910	929		—
1920	700		−24.7%
1930	590		−15.7%
1940	907		53.7%
1950	804		−11.4%
1960	770		−4.2%
1970	1,094		42.1%
1980	1,677		53.3%
1990	1,308		−22.0%
2000	1,408		7.6%
2010	1,690		20.0%
2020	1,588		−6.0%
2019 (est.)	1,710		1.2%
U.S. Decennial Census

== Demographics ==
=== 2020 census ===
As of the 2020 census, Duchesne had a population of 1,588. The median age was 35.7 years. 30.0% of residents were under the age of 18 and 14.3% of residents were 65 years of age or older. For every 100 females there were 112.3 males, and for every 100 females age 18 and over there were 113.0 males age 18 and over.

0.0% of residents lived in urban areas, while 100.0% lived in rural areas.

There were 530 households in Duchesne, of which 42.6% had children under the age of 18 living in them. Of all households, 56.2% were married-couple households, 16.4% were households with a male householder and no spouse or partner present, and 22.3% were households with a female householder and no spouse or partner present. About 20.4% of all households were made up of individuals and 8.3% had someone living alone who was 65 years of age or older.

There were 616 housing units, of which 14.0% were vacant. The homeowner vacancy rate was 2.0% and the rental vacancy rate was 19.0%.

Racial composition as of the 2020 census
Race	Number	Percent
White	1,467	92.4%
Black or African American	4	0.3%
American Indian and Alaska Native	21	1.3%
Asian	2	0.1%
Native Hawaiian and Other Pacific Islander	2	0.1%
Some other race	44	2.8%
Two or more races	48	3.0%
Hispanic or Latino (of any race)	85	5.4%

=== 2010 census ===
As of the census of 2010, there were 1,690 people, 797 households, and 601 families residing in the city. The population density was 893 people per square mile. There were 550 housing units at an average density of 238.8 per square mile (92.3/km^{2}). The racial makeup of the city was 98.01% White, 0.0% African American, 0.37% Native American, 0.0% Asian, 0.0% Pacific Islander, 1.64% from other races, and 0.0% from two or more races. Hispanic or Latino of any race were 2.57% of the population.

There were 797 households, out of which 44.67% had children under 18 living with them, 63.82% were married couples living together, 8.9% had a female householder with no husband present, and 26.1% were non-families. 22.0% of all households were made up of individuals, and 10.8% had someone living alone who was 65 years of age or older. The average household size was 2.97, and the average family size was 3.55.

In the city, the age distribution of the population shows 31.88% under the age of 18, 14.45% from 18 to 24, 21.72% from 25 to 44, 20.81% from 45 to 64, and 10.15% who were 65 years of age or older. The median age was 28 years.

The median income for a household in the city was $46,318, and the median income for a family was $58,009. The per capita income for the city was $20,262.

=== 2015 ===
As of 2015 the largest self-reported ancestry groups in Duchesne, Utah are:

Largest ancestries (2015)	Percent
English	36.4%
German	20.4%
Irish	12.2%
Swedish	7.3%
Scottish	5.9%
Danish	5.9%
Italian	5.2%
American	4.5%
Dutch	2.3%
Norwegian	2.2%
Welsh	2.0%
French	1.5%
Swiss	2.0%

== See also ==
- List of cities and towns in Utah
- High Uintas Wilderness
- Uinta Mountains
- Uintah Basin
