= Thomas Forsyth House =

Historic house in Utah, United States

- U.S. National Register of Historic Places
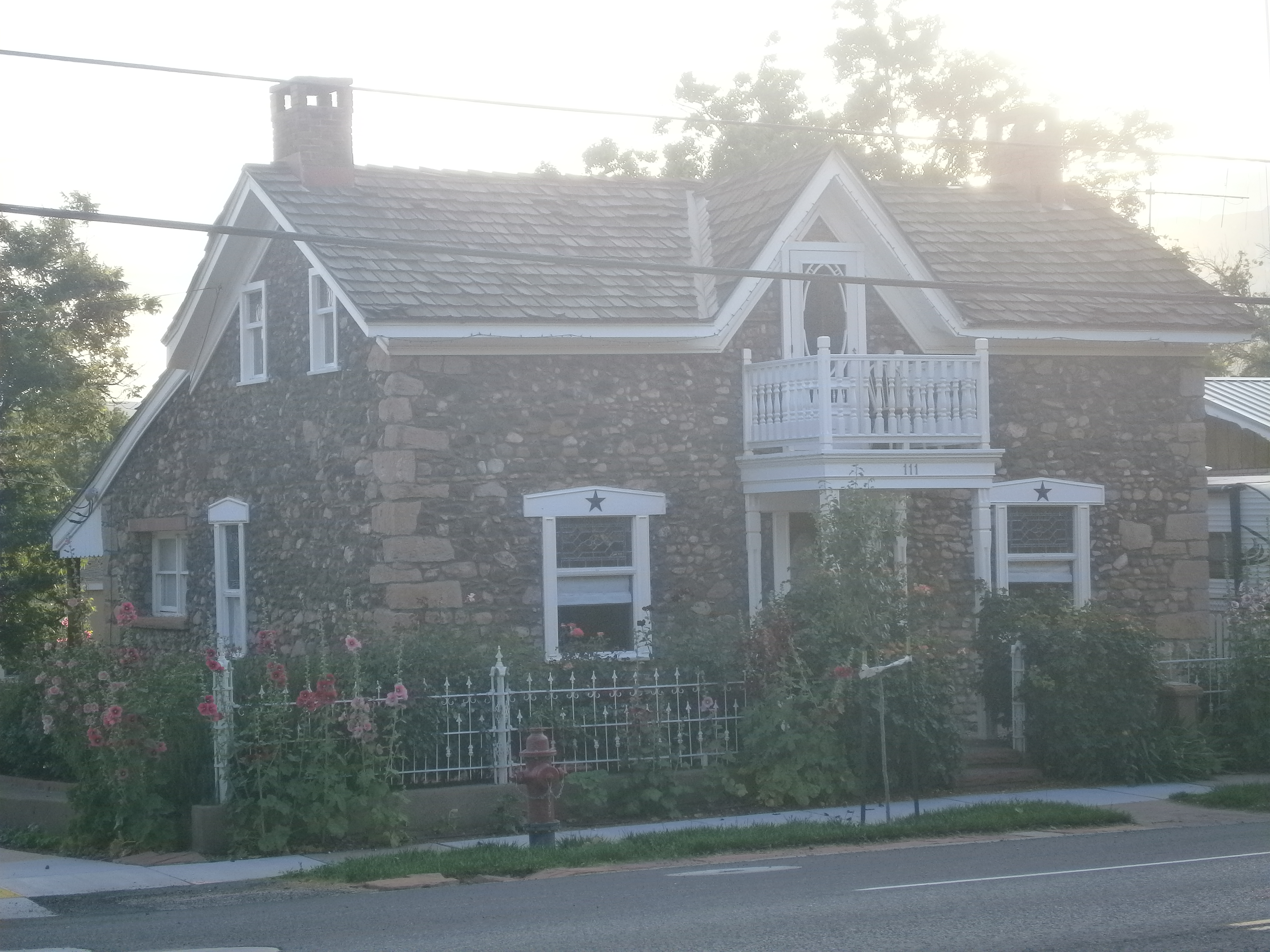

- Location within Utah Location within the United States
- Location: 111 N. Toquerville Blvd., Toquerville, Utah
- Coordinates: 37°15′10.5″N 113°17′05.9″W
- Area: less than one acre
- Built: c. 1868
- Built by: Thomas Forsyth
- NRHP reference No.: 82004184
- Added to NRHP: February 11, 1982

The Thomas Forsyth House is the historic home of an early settler of Toquerville, Utah. One of the Mormon pioneers, Thomas Forsyth (or Forsythe) built the house circa 1868 and lived there until his death in 1898. He operated mills, dried fruit and stocked the cellar with wine he made himself, while his wife Mary Browett Holmes ran a glove shop. The simple 1½-story fieldstone construction, a hall-and-parlor house extended with a lean-to, is representative of the pioneer period.

It was added to the National Register of Historic Places on February 11, 1982, for its historical and architectural connection to "the first effective settlement of Utah's Dixie."

== Architecture ==
The 1 1/2-story house, with a rock basement (a former wine cellar), is made of 1.5-foot (46 cm) uncoursed rubble with cut-stone quoins on each corner. Each floor has four rooms; the hall-and-parlor plan on the front is hidden by a symmetrical, minimally-decorated facade, with an attic door set in a gable to allow large items to be brought up. Two large stone fireplaces remain in the front rooms. The building is extended by an original one-story lean-to on the rear, which served as the kitchen and hosts the staircase to the upper floor.

The double-hung sash windows have been removed, along with the third kitchen fireplace, and (around 1915) a porch and balcony that used to run the length of the building. A new window was added in the south wall of the lean-to, and a modern bathroom added to the back of the house. However, the house "retains its historic character."

== History ==
Thomas Forsyth (or Forsythe) was born in Kelso, Scotland, on September 20, 1813. He settled in Port Huron, Michigan, in April 1839; he and his wife Isabella Donald converted to the LDS Church in 1844, and moved to the Mormons' center at Nauvoo, Illinois. They journeyed west to Salt Lake City in 1850, where Isabella died two years later. Thomas married Mary Ann Browett in 1854.

By 1865 they had moved to Washington County in southern Utah. He operated a shingle mill and sawmill in what is now called Forsyth Canyon, at the foot of the Pine Valley Mountains, supplying the shingles for the Washington Cotton Factory. But after discovering that five other mill permits had been issued he left for nearby Toquerville. On the Ash Creek he established a new mill at the expense of $4,000, which was however very profitable in some years.

Forsyth built his house from fieldstone and Pine Valley lumber processed at his own sawmill. (The construction is alternatively attributed to one G.M. Spilsbury.) He stocked the cellar with wine of his own making, which was used sacramentally by the Church, and built the first fruit evaporator in southern Utah. Trading dried peaches for buckskins with Indians at Sevier, Mary tanned leather and ran a glove shop (no longer standing). It is said that as soon as the Church denounced the use of wine, Mary went home and cut the pipes in the cellar, draining away the whole supply.

On his death in 1898, Thomas left the house to his youngest son Benjamin Henry Forsyth and daughter-in-law Barbara Ann Lamb, who had lived in a smaller building just behind the house. After Benjamin's death in 1948 the house was sold and remained in private ownership thereafter, one of the few remaining homes of the pioneer period in Washington County. The Thomas Forysth House was added to the National Register of Historic Places on February 11, 1982, with the nomination citing its historical and architectural connection to "the first effective settlement of Utah's Dixie."

== See also ==
Other historic Toquerville properties:

- Naegle Winery
- John Steele House
