= Duchesne River =

Duchesne River Euwinty
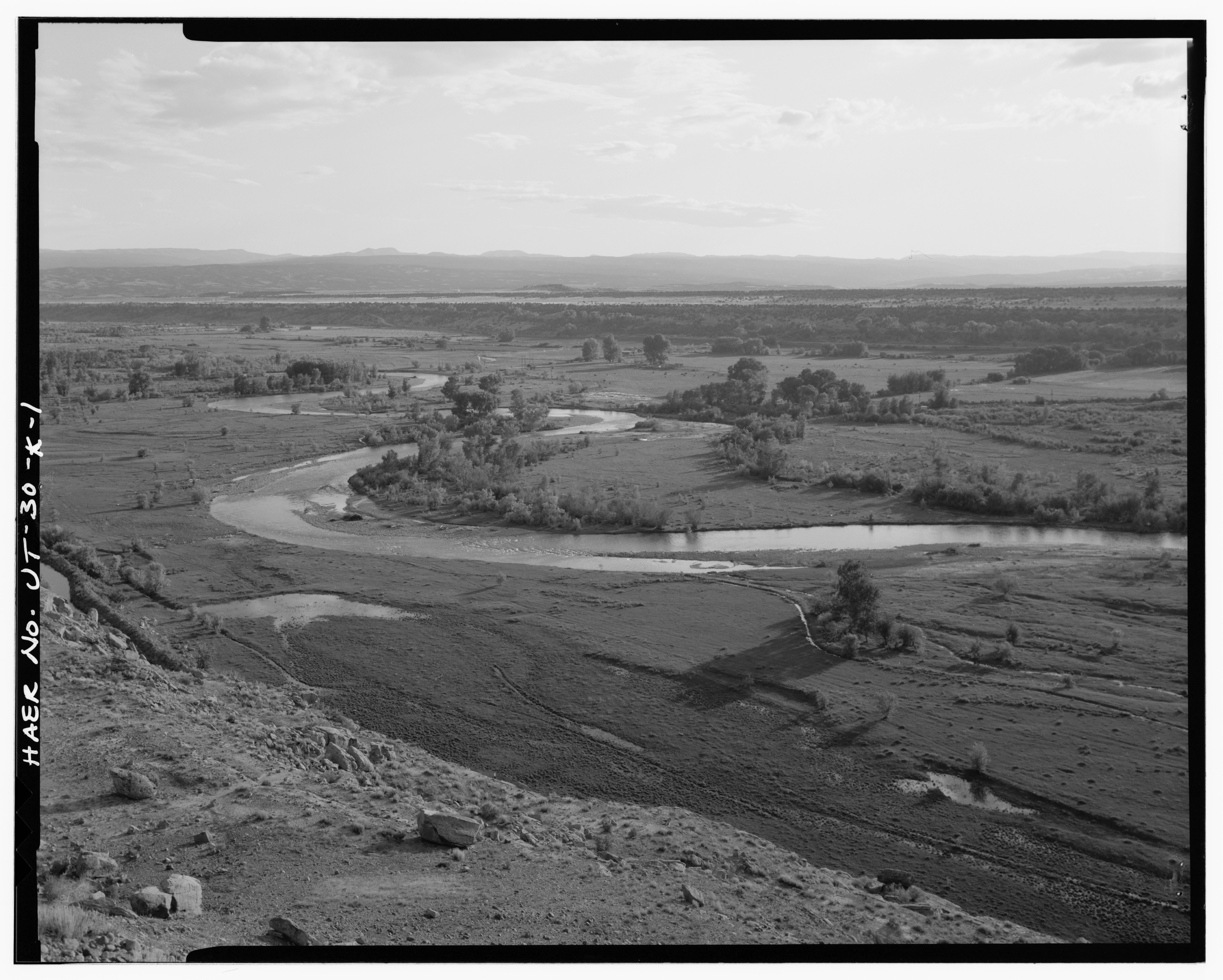
- The Duchesne River near Duchesne, Utah

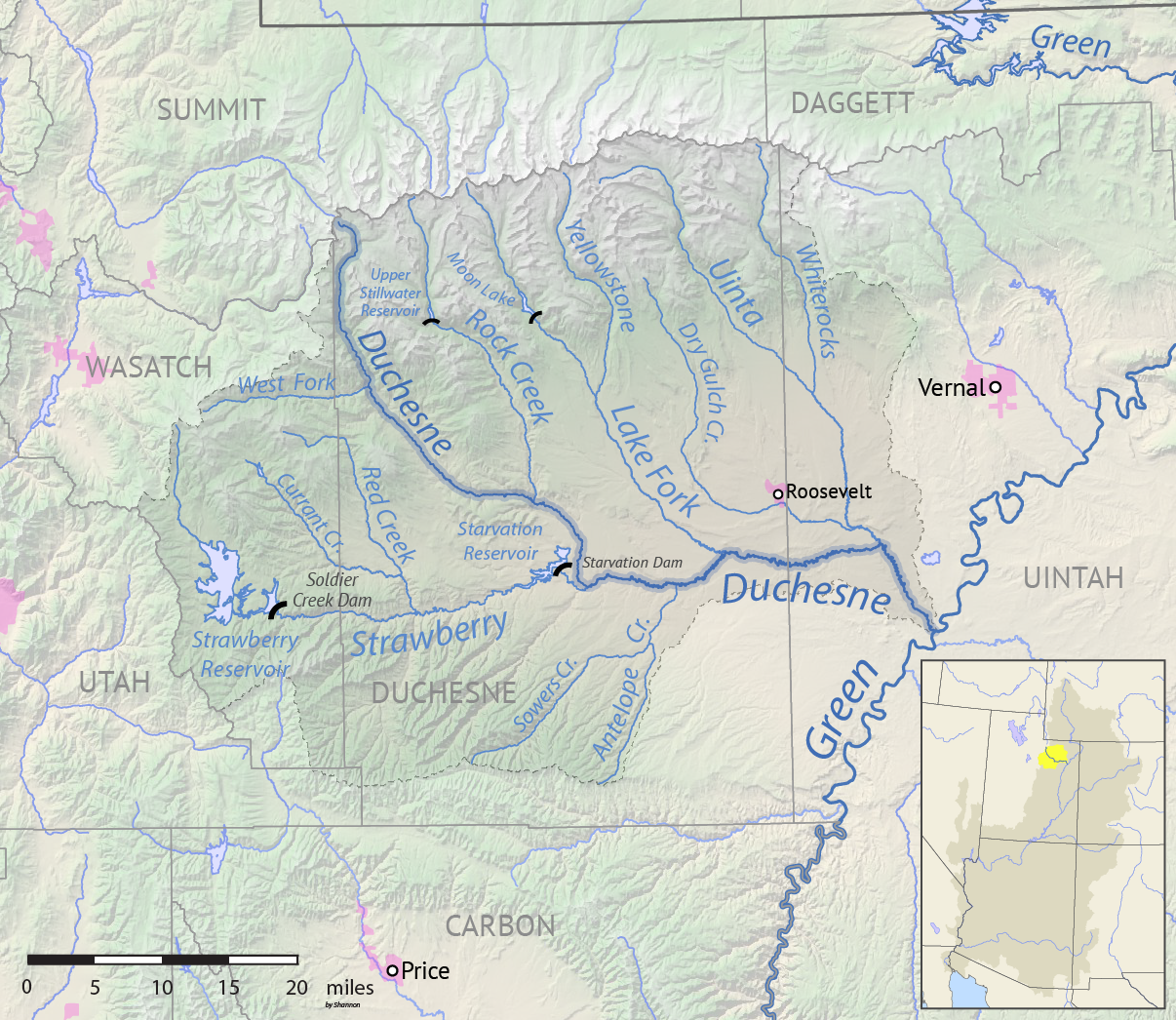
- Map of the Duchesne River watershed

Location
- Country: United States
- State: Utah
- Cities: Duchesne, Tabiona, Myton, Randlett, Hanna

Physical characteristics
- Source: Uinta Mountains
  - location: Duchesne County, Utah
  - coordinates: 40°42′31″N 110°52′25″W
  - elevation: 10,093 ft (3,076 m)
- Mouth: Green River
  - location: Uintah County, Utah
  - coordinates: 40°05′08″N 109°40′45″W
  - elevation: 4,652 ft (1,418 m)
- Length: 115 mi (185 km)
- Basin size: 3,790 sq mi (9,800 km^{2})
- Discharge
  - location: Randlett
  - average: 522 cu ft/s (14.8 m^{3}/s)
  - minimum: 0.78 cu ft/s (0.022 m^{3}/s)
  - maximum: 11,500 cu ft/s (330 m^{3}/s)

Basin features
- Tributaries
  - left: Lake Fork River, Uinta River
  - right: Strawberry River

The Duchesne River (/duːˈʃeɪn/ doo-SHAYN), located in the Uintah Basin region of Utah in the western United States, is a tributary of the Green River. The watershed of the river covers the Northeastern corner of Utah. The Duchesne River is 115 miles (185 km) long, and drains a total land area of 3,790 square miles (9,800 km^{2}).

== Geography ==
The Duchesne River begins in the Uinta Mountains in northern Utah. It first flows southeast, then turns east at the confluence of the Strawberry River, which enters from the west. It picks up the Lake Fork River from the north near Myton and the Uinta River from the north at Randlett. Below Randlett it turns southeast, emptying into the Green River at Ouray. The Duchesne River proper flows through Duchesne and Uintah counties, although some of its watersheds extend into Wasatch County.

The Yellowstone River is a major tributary of the Lake Fork, and the Whiterocks River flows into the Uinta River. Other major tributaries include Rock Creek, which flows into the Duchesne River southwest of Talmage, and Currant Creek, a tributary of the Strawberry River.

== History ==
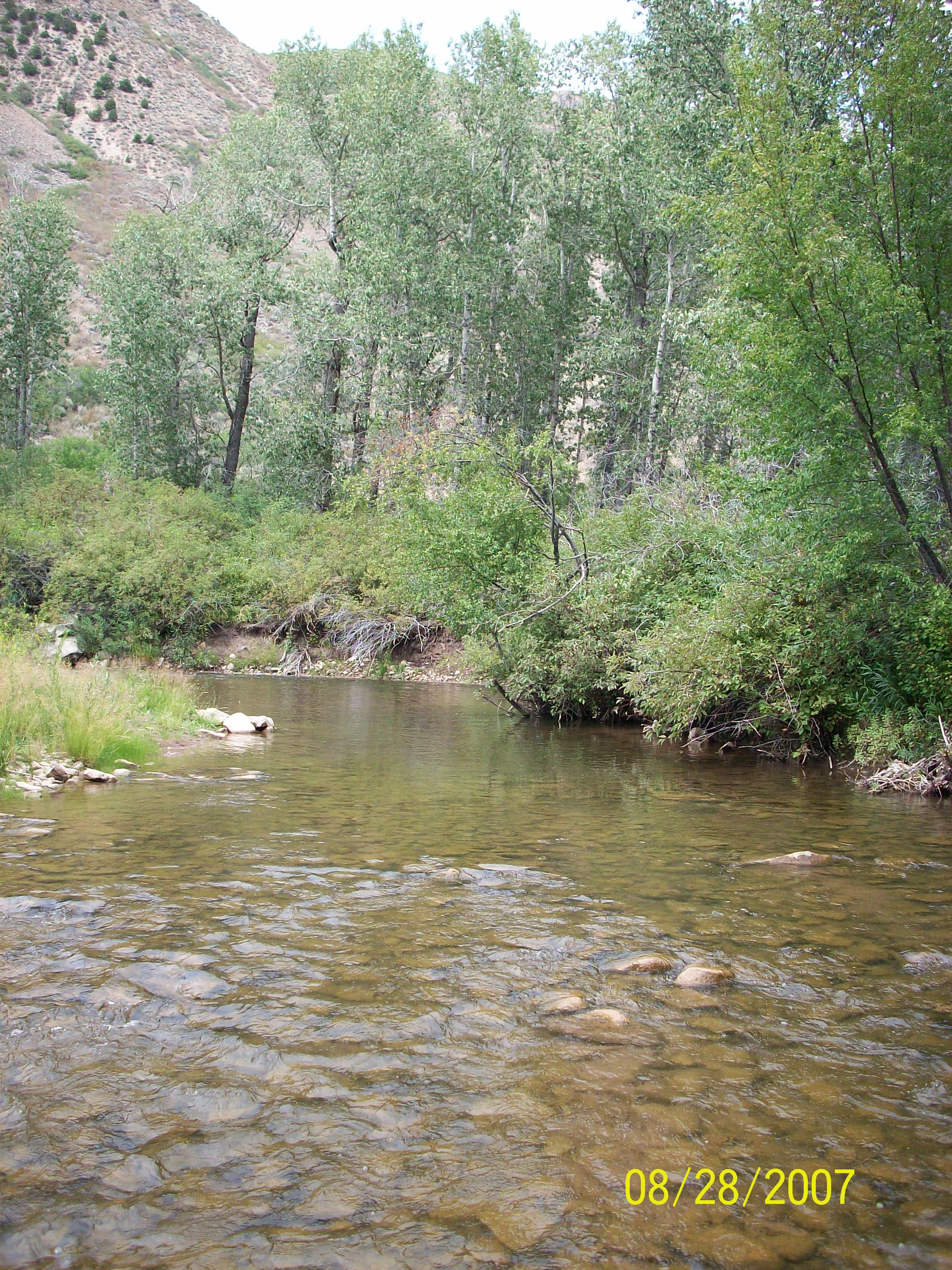
Headwaters of the Duchesne River

Named Santa Caterina de Sena by Dominguez-Escalante in September 1776, the river likely received its permanent name from early French American trappers. From 1824 to 1840, the river and its tributaries provided tons of beaver pelts used to make hats. William Henry Ashley upon entering the Uinta Basin from the north in 1825 and exploring the branches of the Green River called the Duchesne branch, the "Euwinty" river. The first reference to the "Duchesne Fork" is from a map created by Warren A Ferris in 1835.

In 1842 a map created by John C. Frémont labeled the main course of the river the Uintah River and starting at the fork where the current town of Duchesne is located; the northern fork is labeled "Duchesne Fork". The main course of the river continued to be called the Uintah River through the 1860s until the first Indian agency was created. US Army engineer Captain Simpson's 10th infantry listed it as Des Chesney's fork of the Uinta river.

The exact source of the name Duchesne is not known. It is likely that the river was named by one of the French trappers who came into the area as early as 1808 with the Manuel Lisa trapping company but is more likely around 1824 with the Provost/Robidoux/Leclerc parties.

Possible inspiration for the name "Duchesne":

- Mother Rose Philippine Duchesne, founder of the School of the Sacred Heart near St. Louis, Missouri
- The Ute word "doo-shane" means "dark canyon."
- André Duchesne, French historian
- A French trapper named Du Chasne
- The name "Du chesne" is French for "of the oak (tree)."

== River modifications ==
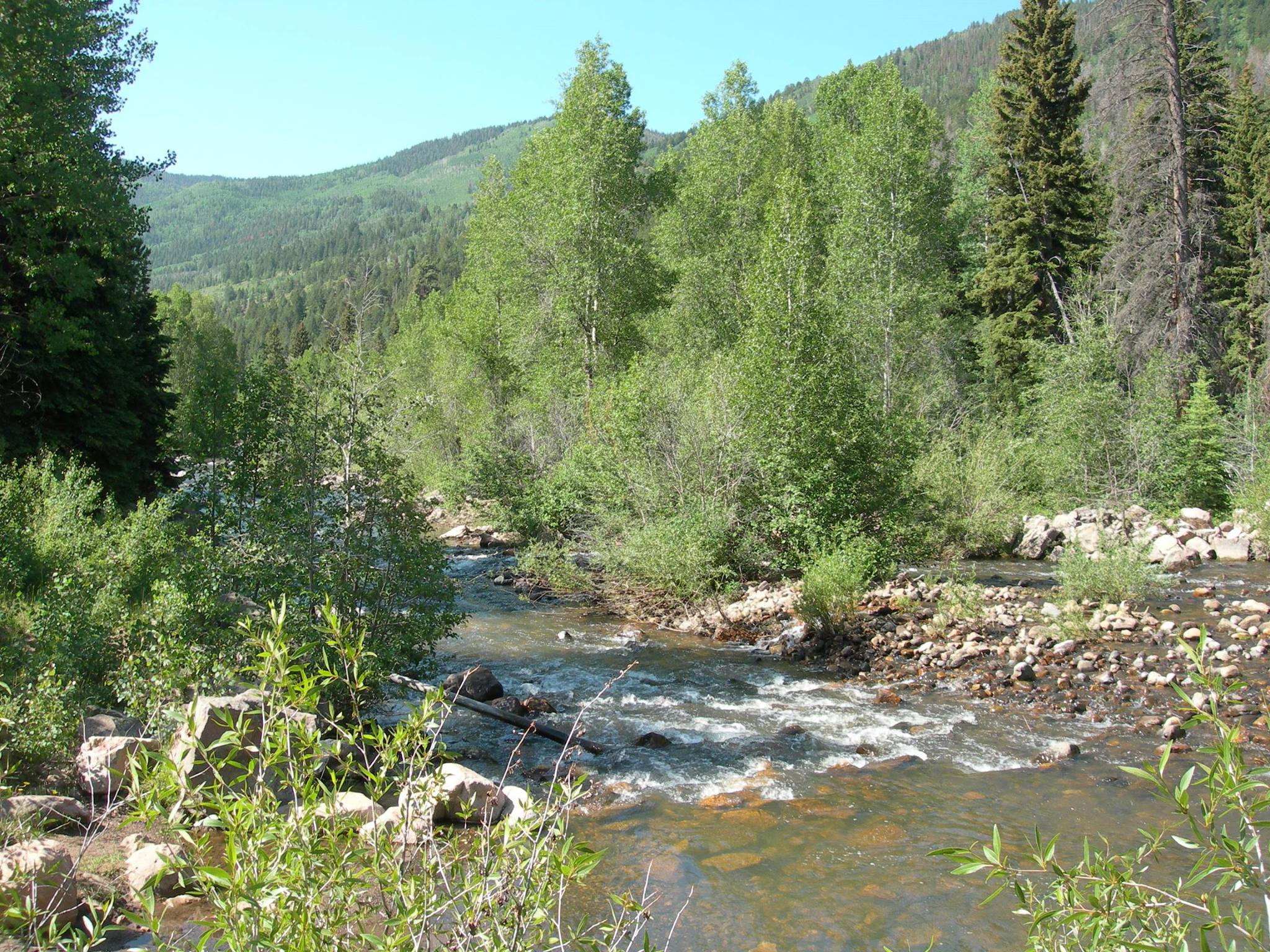
North Fork of Duchesne Canyon

Most of the water in the Duchesne River is the result of snowmelt in the Uinta Mountains. According to the U.S. Bureau of Reclamation, the average unimpaired runoff between 1906 and 2014 was 787,000 acre-feet (971,000,000 m^{3}). In an average year, much of the flow is diverted for irrigation or through the Central Utah Project, which provides water for Salt Lake City and the Wasatch Front, Utah's largest metropolitan area, reducing the flow at the mouth to 378,000 acre-feet (466,000,000 m^{3}). However, in late spring and early summer of wet years, the Duchesne River can become a large torrent carrying many thousands of cubic feet of water per second.

The Lake Fork of the Duchesne River is impounded by the Moon Lake Dam, built in 1938 by the Bureau of Reclamation. Starvation Dam and Soldier Creek Dam, also built by the Bureau of Reclamation, are located on the Strawberry River, the longest tributary of the Duchesne River.

== See also ==
- List of rivers of Utah
- List of tributaries of the Colorado River
