= Willow Creek (Grand and Uintah counties, Utah) =

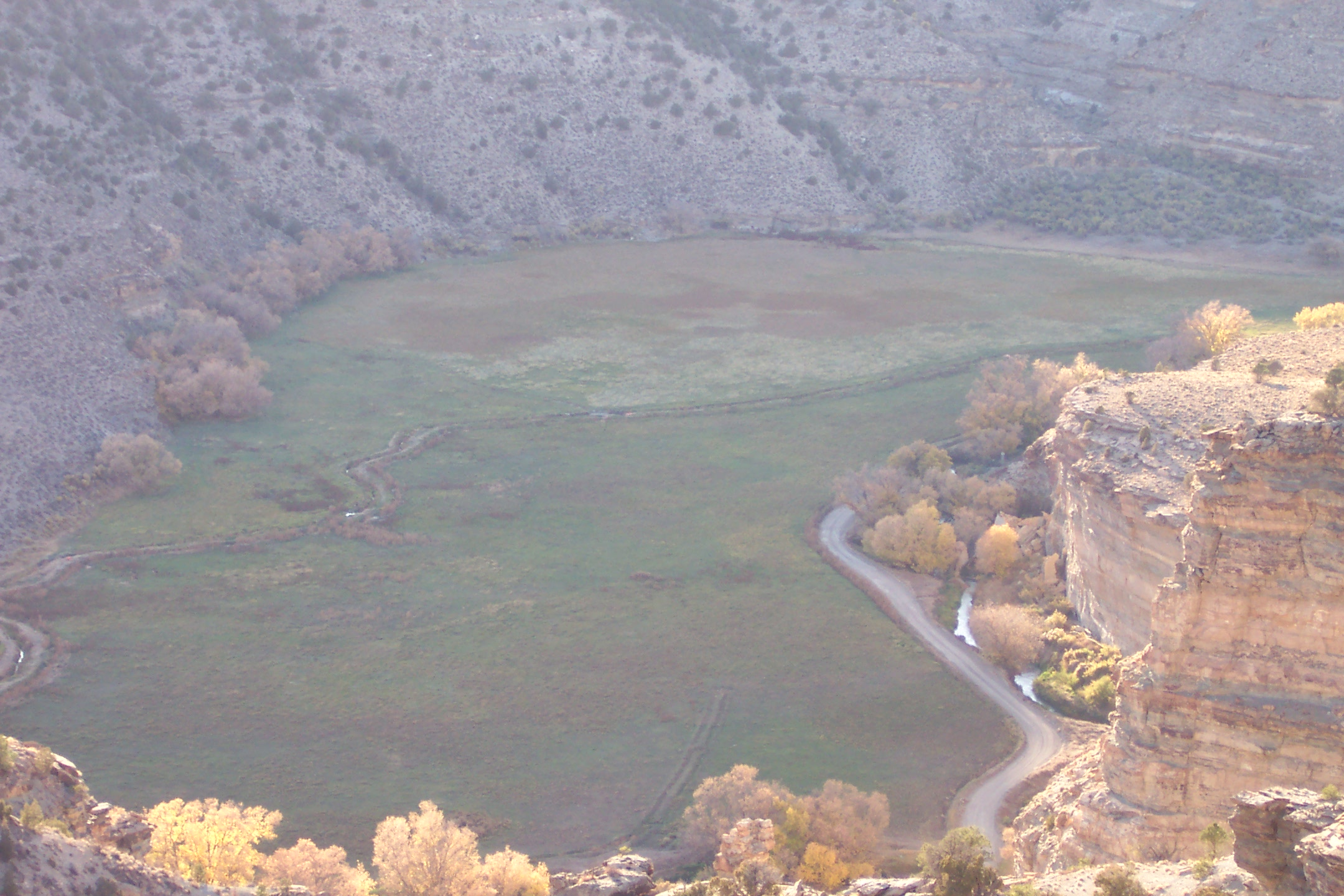

- Location of the mouth of Willow Creek in Utah Willow Creek (Grand and Uintah counties, Utah) (the United States)

Location
- Country: United States
- State: Utah

Physical characteristics
- Source: Roan Cliffs
  - location: Grand County
  - coordinates: 39°20′32″N 109°39′51″W
  - elevation: 6,794 ft (2,071 m)
- Mouth: Green River
  - location: Uintah County
  - coordinates: 40°01′37″N 109°44′35″W
  - elevation: 4,642 ft (1,415 m)
- Length: 78 mi (126 km)
- Basin size: 897 sq mi (2,320 km^{2})
- Discharge
  - location: below Hill Creek near Ouray
  - average: 26.5 cu ft/s (0.75 m^{3}/s)
  - minimum: 0 cu ft/s (0 m^{3}/s)
  - maximum: 11,000 cu ft/s (310 m^{3}/s)

Willow Creek is a major north-flowing stream in Utah, United States, and is a tributary of the Green River. The creek drains a large remote area of the East Tavaputs Plateau, flowing into the Green River south of Ouray.

== Geography ==
Willow Creek begins at the confluence of its East and West Forks about 25 miles (40 km) north of Thompson, Utah, in Grand County, to the north of the Roan Cliffs divide. East Willow Creek starts at an elevation of 8,504 feet (2,592 m) at a spring along the Roan Cliffs; the shorter West Willow Creek originates at an elevation of 8,359 feet (2,548 m). East Willow Creek is joined by She Canyon before combining with West Willow Creek to form the main stem. From there, Willow Creek flows northward into Uintah County, through the Uintah and Ouray Indian Reservation, across the East Tavaputs Plateau at the bottom of a rugged gorge. It receives several major tributaries from the east, including Meadow Creek, Main Canyon, and Sunday School Canyon. Below Sunday School Canyon, Willow Creek flows through a wider valley along the east side of Big Pack Mountain to its confluence with Hill Creek, its largest tributary. Above their confluence, Hill Creek is almost the same length as Willow Creek, flowing roughly parallel and several miles to the west of Willow Creek. Below this point Willow Creek turns northwest to join the Green River about 5 miles (8.0 km) south of Ouray and 3 miles (4.8 km) below the confluence of the White River.

There are no dams on Willow Creek, but there is one dam on Hill Creek, forming Towave Reservoir. Willow Creek is used for agriculture, mainly livestock water supply. The creek has high levels of dissolved solids and is considered an impaired water body.

== See also ==
- List of rivers of Utah
- List of tributaries of the Colorado River
