= Utah State Route 88 =

State highway in Uintah County, Utah, United States

State Route 88

Route information
- Maintained by UDOT
- Length: 16.996 mi (27.352 km)
- Existed: 1935–present

Major junctions
- South end: Ouray
- North end: US 40 / US 191 near Fort Duchesne

Location
- Country: United States
- State: Utah
- Counties: Uintah

Highway system
- Utah State Highway System; Interstate; US; State; Minor; Scenic
← SR-87	→ US 89

State Route 88 (SR-88) is a state highway in the U.S. state of Utah, connecting Ouray to US-40/US-191.

== Route description ==
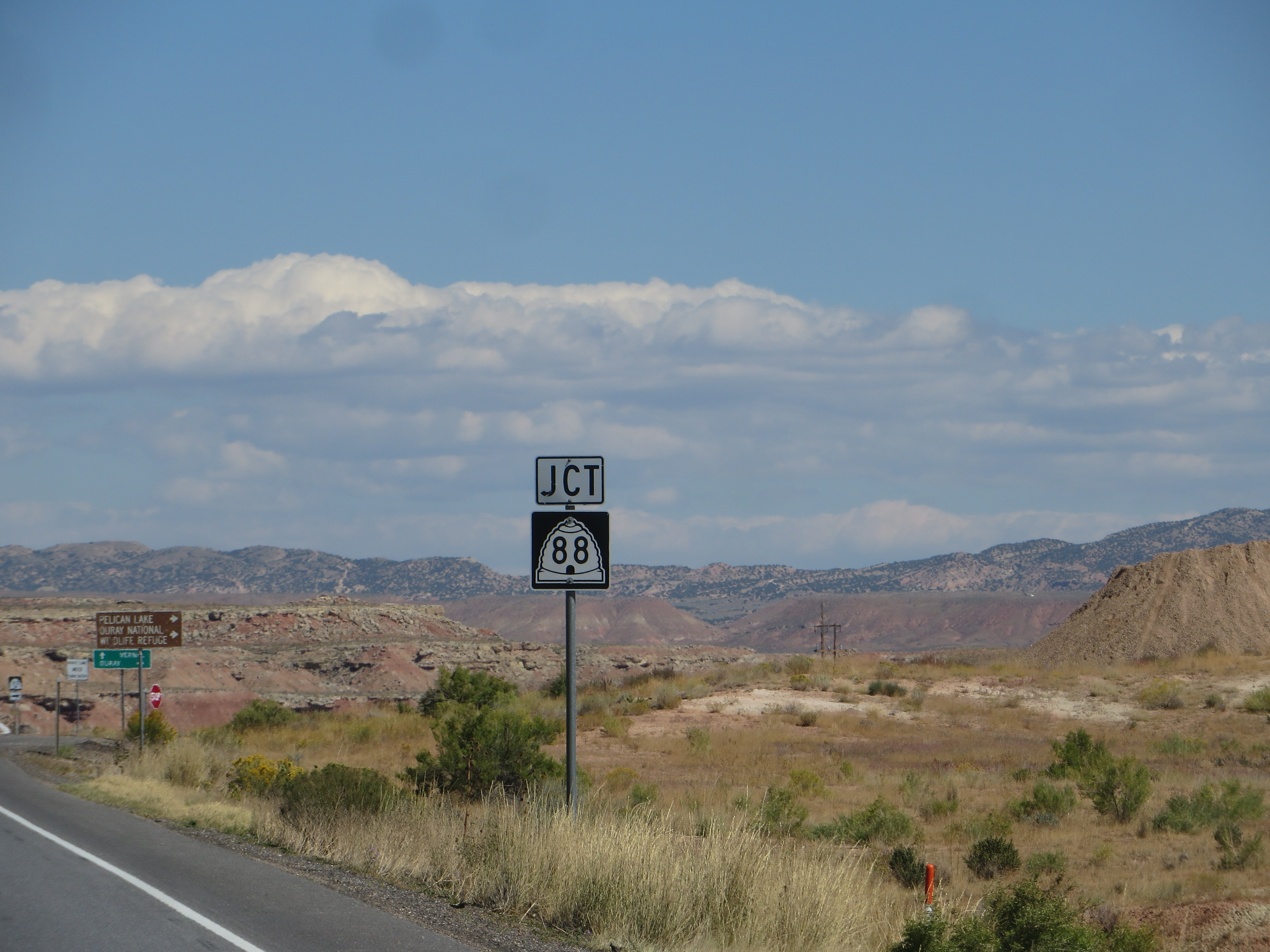
US-40 and US-191 approaching SR-88

SR-88 begins at the south end of the Green River bridge near Ouray, within the Uintah Basin. It heads northwards, gradually climbing through the valley of that river, passing east of Pelican Lake, and onto a more rugged plateau just beyond the intersection with 4500 South (which carried SR-88 until 1969). The route's north end is at US-40/US-191 on this plateau.

== History ==
The state legislature defined State Route 88 in 1935, connecting Ouray to SR-6 (US-40) at Fort Duchesne. State Route 209 was created in 1941, heading north from SR-88 near Leota to US-40 east of Fort Duchesne. In 1969, SR-88 was realigned to follow SR-209, with the old alignment to Fort Duchesne becoming a county road.

== Major intersections ==
The entire route is in Uintah County.

Location	mi	km	Destinations	Notes
Ouray	0.000	0.000	Seep Ridge Road (south) - East Tavaputs Plateau	Southern terminus
Ouray	0.002– 0.081	0.0032– 0.130	Green River	
	9.980	16.061	East 5500 South (west) - Randlett, Fort Duchesene	Former routing of SR-88
	16.996	27.352	US 40 / US 191 – Fort Duchesne, Roosevelt, Vernal	Northern terminus
1.000 mi = 1.609 km; 1.000 km = 0.621 mi
