= Curtis Creek (Utah) =

Stream in Cache County, Utah, U.S.

Coordinates: 41.5996592°N 111.5685439°W

Curtis Creek is a stream in Cache County, Utah, United States.

Curtis Creek bears the name of Lehi Curtis, a local rancher.

== See also ==
- List of rivers of Utah
