= John Steele House (Toquerville, Utah) =

Historic house in Utah, United States

- U.S. National Register of Historic Places
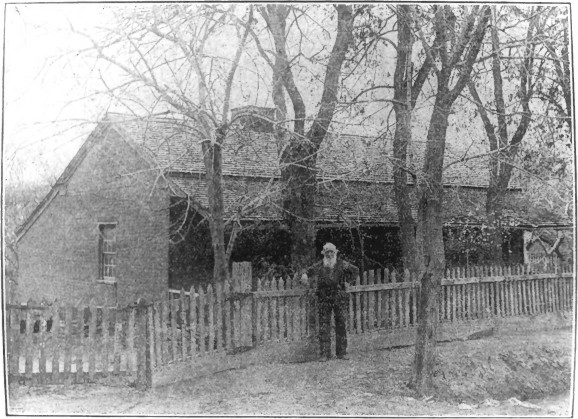
- Steele in front of the house c. 1900

- Location within Utah Location within the United States
- Location: 263 N. Toquerville Blvd., Toquerville, Utah
- Coordinates: 37°15′20″N 113°17′8″W
- Area: less than one acre
- Built: 1862
- Built by: John Steele
- Architectural style: double cell
- NRHP reference No.: 88000401
- Added to NRHP: April 7, 1988

The John Steele House is the historic home of a prominent early resident of Toquerville, Utah. One of the Mormon pioneers, John Steele built the house in 1862 and lived there until his death in 1903, working as an herbal physician and serving in a number of town and county offices. Its floor plan is a rare double-parlor style.

The house was listed on the National Register of Historic Places in 1988 for its architectural and historical significance.

== Architecture ==
The one-story house stands on a foundation of stone, with red adobe walls and a wooden gable roof. Most Toquerville homes from this period were built of log rather than adobe.

It is one of only three well-documented examples of a double-parlor house in Utah: it is divided into two parlors and a narrower hall on the northern end. The Steele house has an extra door compared to most double-parlor houses (with one door and three windows), producing a symmetrical facade that gives the misleading appearance of a double-cell house (with two rooms of equal size). The center room, with a large fireplace, served as the kitchen.

An adobe lean-to was added in the 1860s–1870s on the left third of the rear, and further expanded with a frame lean-to on the right two-thirds in the 1930s. A full-width porch pictured in 1900 is now removed; it is unknown whether it was original. The exterior walls were probably stuccoed white in the early 20th century. With a "virtually unaltered" interior and the original doors and windows, however, the house "maintains a high degree of its original integrity."

== History ==
Toquerville had only been founded three years ago when John Steele moved there from nearby Parowan in 1861, as part of southern Utah's settlement by the Mormons. His family came in 1862. Experienced with making and laying adobe brick, which he had done in Salt Lake City, Steele probably built the house himself that year.

He served as postmaster (1865), justice of the peace (1868–1869), and as surveyor (1873) and assessor (1874–1875) of Kane County. He also had a nearby boot and shoe shop, and went on several LDS Church missions. But "Doc" Steele derived much of his reputation from setting bones, administering herbal medicines and making horoscopes. Despite Utah introducing medical licensing, he continued to practice until his death in 1903.

The privately owned house was listed on the National Register of Historic Places on April 7, 1988. The nomination cites its locally significant architecture and history: "There are approximately a dozen houses in the community that date from the first decade or two of settlement, but few of them are as old and as well preserved as the Steele House."

== See also ==
Other historic Toquerville properties:

- Thomas Forsyth House
- Naegle Winery
