= John Steele (pioneer) =

American physician

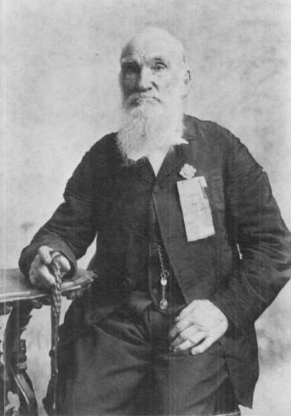
John Steele

John Steele (21 March 1821 – 31 December 1903) was an Irish-American pioneer, local politician, medical doctor, and astrologist. Born in Ireland, after converting to the Church of Jesus Christ of Latter-day Saints in Glasgow, Steele and his wife emigrated to Nauvoo, Illinois. Steele joined the Mormon Battalion and traveled to Salt Lake City with the Mormon pioneers. He was one of the founders of Parowan, Utah. Steele also contributed to the development of Iron, Kane, and Washington counties in Utah.

He practiced as an unorthodox physician in Toquerville, using herbs, astrology, and aspects of magic to treat patients. He could no longer practice in Utah after physician licences were required, but his knowledge of astrology and broken bone setting were still desired. His daughter, Young Elizabeth Steele, was the first white child born in Utah.

== Early life ==
John Steele was born on 21 March 1821, in Holywood, County Down, Ireland. His parents were John and Nancy Steele, and he had two older sisters: Elisabeth and Jane. At the age of fifteen Steele worked as an apprentice shoemaker, and moved to Belfast in 1839 to start a shoemaking business. When he was nineteen, he met Catherine Campbell. She was the daughter of Michael and Mary Campbell. He married Catherine Campbell on 1 January 1840, and their daughter Mary was born on 23 December. Steele's father died the next 12 January.

John Steele's boot and shoe business in Belfast failed in 1840 because of poor economic conditions, which caused him to move to Glasgow, Scotland, to seek different employment. In 1841 Steele joined the Independent Order of Rechabites (IOR). Steele was unsatisfied with his Presbyterian religion. After Steele's son John was born on 2 June 1842, Steele read the Book of Mormon. John Steele and his wife were baptized as members of the Church of Jesus Christ of Latter-day Saints in Glasgow in 1843; John on 10 April and Catherine on 3 May. Steele's other child Margaret was born on 17 June 1844, and died 18 December the next year.

== Pioneer and political career ==
John Steele and his family left for New Orleans in the United States on 21 January 1845, on the ship Palmyra. After arriving in New Orleans on 7 March, they traveled to St. Louis on the Mississippi River. Soon after, they arrived in Nauvoo, Illinois. In Nauvoo he joined the Tanners and Shoemakers Association, the Nauvoo Legion, and the Masons. While Steele was absent during an expedition of the Nauvoo Legion, his family became ill and his children John and Margaret died on 10 December and 18 December respectively.

=== Exodus to Utah ===
He joined the Mormon exodus to the West on 4 May 1846. They traveled to Council Bluffs, Iowa, where he enlisted as a member of the Mormon Battalion. He was a member of Company D, headed by Nelson Higgins. Instead of traveling to California through Santa Fe, Steele was directed to go to Salt Lake City with the other Latter-day Saint. Steele arrived in Salt Lake on 29 July 1847, with the Pueblo detachment. His daughter Young Elizabeth Steele, born on 9 August that year, was the first Mormon child born in Utah. Young Elizabeth Steele would study obstetrics and become a midwife. Skilled in masonry, Steele claimed to have built one-third of the first fort in Salt Lake City.

Steele faced many hardships during his winter in the Salt Lake valley. His crops were ruined by the cattle of incoming pioneers; however, his family was able to survive on cornmeal and trading milk products from their cow. Steele's 1848 crop was also ruined by insects, frost, and cattle. Steele's son Mahonri Moriancumer Steele was born on 1 May 1849. In late 1850 he was called on a mission to Iron County to start an agricultural base for the Iron Mission.

=== Founding of Parowan ===
Steele was made Lieutenant of the Light Infantry Company and the leader of ten wagons in the "Iron Battalion". They faced frostbite, freezing temperatures, and a minor irritations from Native Americans during their travels to southern Utah. Their arrival on 13 January 1851, marked the founding of Parowan. His daughter Susann was born 28 April, and Steele was elected town marshal on 24 May, serving for two years. He led expeditions against Native Americans who were stealing and killing their cattle. Steele was naturalized as a U.S. citizen on 1 June 1852. He was elected mayor of Parowan on 2 June 1853, and served as recorder and judge of Iron County.

John C. Frémont and his party, starving on their way to California, stopped in Parowan on 8 February 1854, and stayed for three weeks. Steele took in some of Frémont's party and loaned the explorer eight maps to copy, which were never returned. Fremont's report in the National Intelligencer reported he learned that the "route down the Virgin River had been examined the year before with a view to settlement this summer by a Mormon exploring party under the Command of Major Steele of Parawan, who (and others of the party) informed me that they found fertile valleys inhabited by Indians who cultivated corn and melons, and the rich ground in many places matted over with grape vines." Steele's main duty as county recorder was to record the Latter-day Saints' consecration deeds. Steele was also a journalist during expeditions on the Virgin River in 1852. Much later Steele and James Jepson of Virgin discovered how to get water from the river to the Hurricane bench (the later creation of the Hurricane Canal allowed for the settling of the city of Hurricane, Utah). Native Americans led them to their chief, who was farming at the future site of Toquerville. During the founding of the Parowan Iron Company, Steele acted as the scribe for George A. Smith; Steele was one of the signers of the document.

=== Las Vegas Mission ===
Steele's daughter Jane Catherine was born 26 April 1855, and his son Robert Henry Steele was born on 1 September 1857, but died on 1 June the next year from an overdose of calomel. Steele was called to the Las Vegas Mission in 1855. Santa Clara Native Americans traveled with the missionaries to protect them from other tribes. Steele and the other missionaries started a fort and a garden in Las Vegas, through which many settlers and Native Americans passed. Steele returned to Parowan on 17 November 1855, but returned again to Las Vegas where he became the first postmaster and president of the mission. In Las Vegas, he helped prospect for lead mines for Brigham Young.

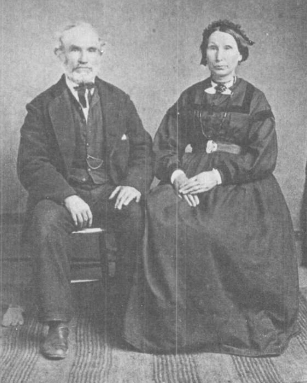
John Steele and his wife Catherine Campbell Steele in Toquerville

=== Settlement in Toquerville ===
Steele and his family were early settlers of Toquerville. He was called on an Indian mission to the Navajo and Moqui Nations with Jacob Hamblin. He was appointed as postmaster of Toquerville on 22 March 1865. He became a major of the Nauvoo Legion's 10th regiment. Steele was elected justice of the peace in Toquerville on 15 April 1868, and several times thereafter. He was elected to the office of county surveyor for Kane County in 1873, and county assessor in 1874 and 1875. Steele and his son Mahonri served missions in England, 1877-1878.

== Medical career ==
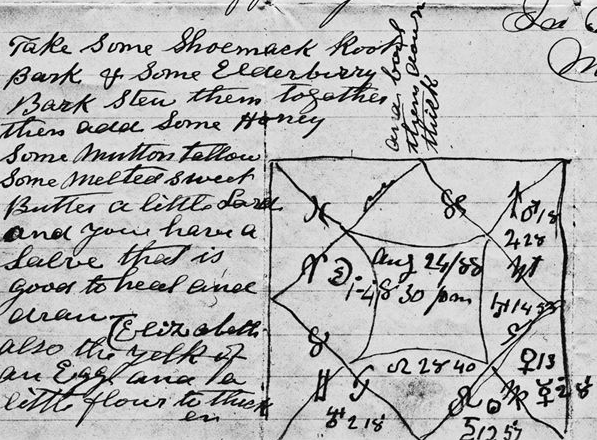
Astrological chart and healing remedy created by Steele for his grandchild's illness included in an 20 August 1888 letter.

In Toquerville, John Steele worked as the town's preeminent doctor. He was known for the way that he integrated medicine, magic, and astrology. He practiced according to the ideas of Samuel Thomson. One of Thomson's theories was that elimination of toxins was key to curing patients; calomel was sometimes used to induce vomiting. Because Steele's son Robert Henry was killed by calomel, Steele preferred Thomson's herbal medicines. He considered himself a veterinarian, using an herbal "horse taming" mixture, and was known for his ability to set broken bones. He was also known for using black magic to fix problems and people in the town solicited him for horoscopes. He was called "Doc", and he was often seen wearing a blue cape with red lining. He also carried a cane and rode a horse named Charlie. While practicing as a doctor, Steele still maintained a shoemaking business.

After the death of his wife Catherine on 15 June 1891, Steele got a temporary housekeeper. Then, 72 years old, Steele married Tamer Elizabeth Booth, on 8 April 1893. Booth was 25 years old and had been married twice. The marriage was tumultuous and only lasted a few years. After Utah began requiring licensed doctors, Steele could no longer practice medicine. He was still listed as a physician, however, in the 1903 Utah State Gazetteer and Business Directory. His knowledge of astrology and his skills for setting broken bones were still desired.

== Later life ==
In his old age, John Steele regularly attended LDS Church services, and worked in the St. George Utah Temple. Steele was ordained a patriarch for the LDS church in 1903.

Steele developed gangrene after stepping on a nail. His own remedies couldn't cure him and an overdose of poison hemlock perhaps advanced his disease. He spent the end of his life with his daughter Elizabeth in Kanarraville. He died on 31 December 1903, and was buried in Parowan with Catherine, who had disliked Toquerville. The John Steele House in Toquerville was added to the National Register of Historic Places on 7 April 1988.

== See also ==
- Cunning Folk Traditions and the Latter Day Saint Movement
