= Fort Robidoux =

Fort Robidoux Fort Uintah, Fort Wintya
- Trading post
- Location in the United States
- Coordinates: 40.4597°N 109.9167°W
- Country: United States
- Established: 1828; 198 years ago (as Reed Trading Post)
- Expanded: 1832; 194 years ago (as Fort Robidoux)
- Destroyed: August 1844; 182 years ago
- Founder: William Reed, James Reed, and Denis Julien
- Named for: Antoine Robidoux

Fort Robidoux (or Rubidoux), also known as Fort Uintah and Fort Wintya, was a fur trading post at the junction of the Uinta River and Whiterocks River in the Uinta Basin of what is today Uintah County, Northeastern Utah. Fort Robidoux was founded in 1832 after Antoine Robidoux bought the Reed Trading Post that had been in operation there since 1828.

== History ==
Robidoux had traded for beaver pelts in the Uintah Basin as early as 1824. By 1828 he had established his first trading post, Fort Uncompahgre, in the intermountain corridor of the western slopes of the Rocky Mountains on the Gunnison River near present-day Delta, Colorado. That same year, Robidoux took out Mexican citizenship and married Carmel Benevedes, the daughter of the governor of New Mexico. This enabled him to obtain a Mexican trading and trapping license.

With Robidoux's focus on the Colorado fort, William Reed, his twelve-year-old nephew James Reed, and Denis Julien traveled to the Uinta Basin and established the Reed Trading Post, making this the first permanent non-Indian residence and business in what would later became the State of Utah. Once his operations were well established on the Gunnison River, Robidoux purchased both the site and business from Reed and expanded their operation by building the larger Fort Robidoux and bringing in trappers to trap the beaver-rich streams of the Green and Uintah rivers.

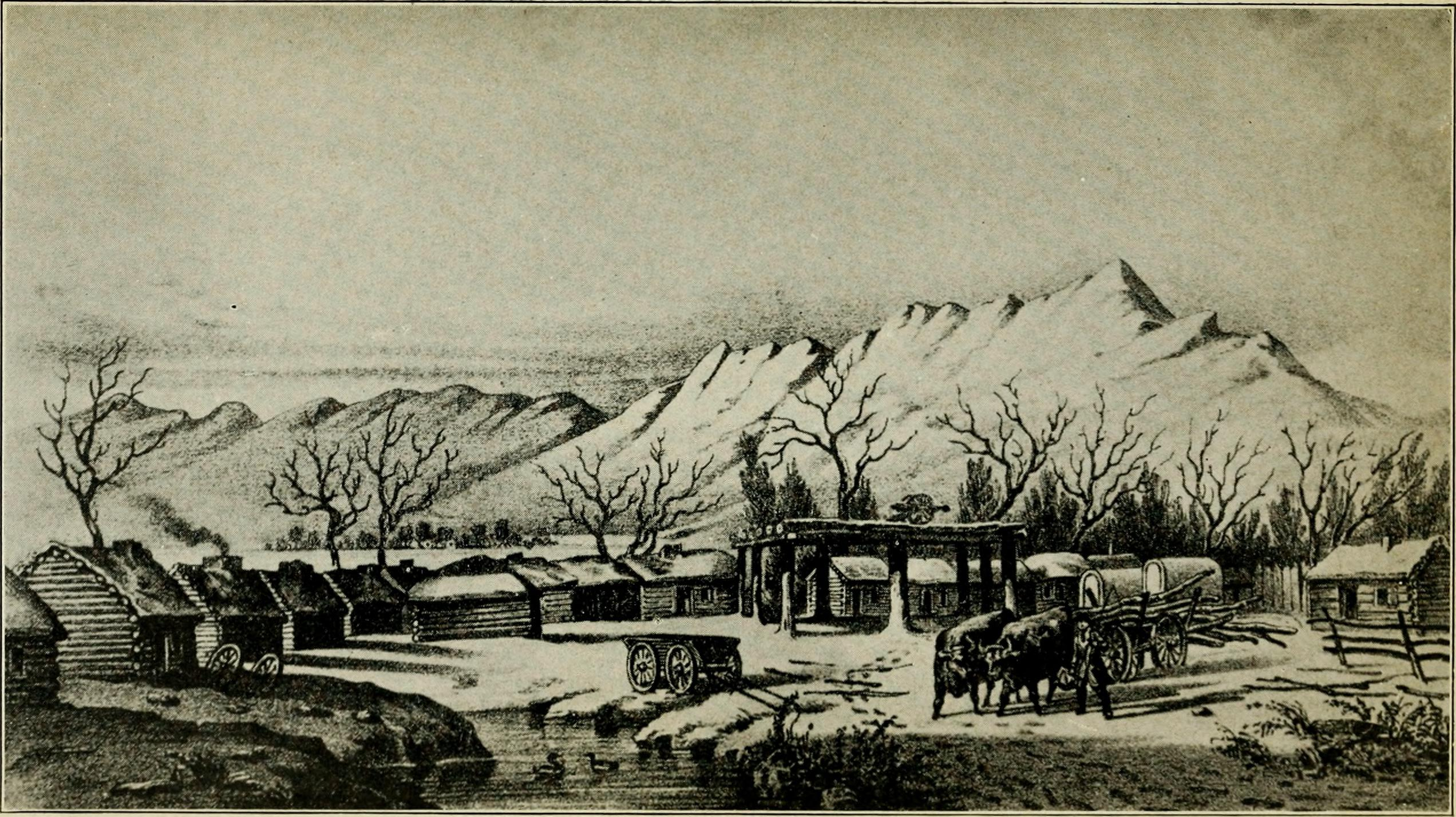
Fort Robidoux in the 1830s, as imagined in 1912 artist's impression

Robidoux successfully competed in the Uinta Basin region's fur trade against competition from Fort Davy Crockett, the American Fur Company, the Hudson's Bay Company, and traders out of Bent's Fort. Robidoux's business practices at Fort Robidoux included trapping and trading for furs from the Indians and from free trappers, horse trading, and the illegal practice of trading both guns and liquor to the Indians. There is some evidence that Robidoux was also involved in Indian slave trade.

During his years in business such notables as Kit Carson, Miles Goodyear, Marcus Whitman, Joe Meeks, Captain John C. Fremont, August Archambeaux, Rufus Sage, and the Reverend Joseph Williams all visited Fort Uintah.

As the beaver trade declined in the late 1830s and early 1840s, so too did Robidoux's business. In August 1844 Ute warriors attacked and burned both Fort Robidoux and Fort Uncompahgre to the ground. Causes for the attack could have included Robidoux's cheating of the Indians, involvement with the capture of Indian women and children for prostitution and slavery, and sales of guns and alcohol to the Utes. The attack and burning of Robidoux's forts were the only successful attack by Indians of a trading post in fur trade history.

== See also ==
- Cabanne's Trading Post
- Fort Buenaventura, another early trading post in present-day Utah
