= Naegle Winery =

- U.S. National Register of Historic Places
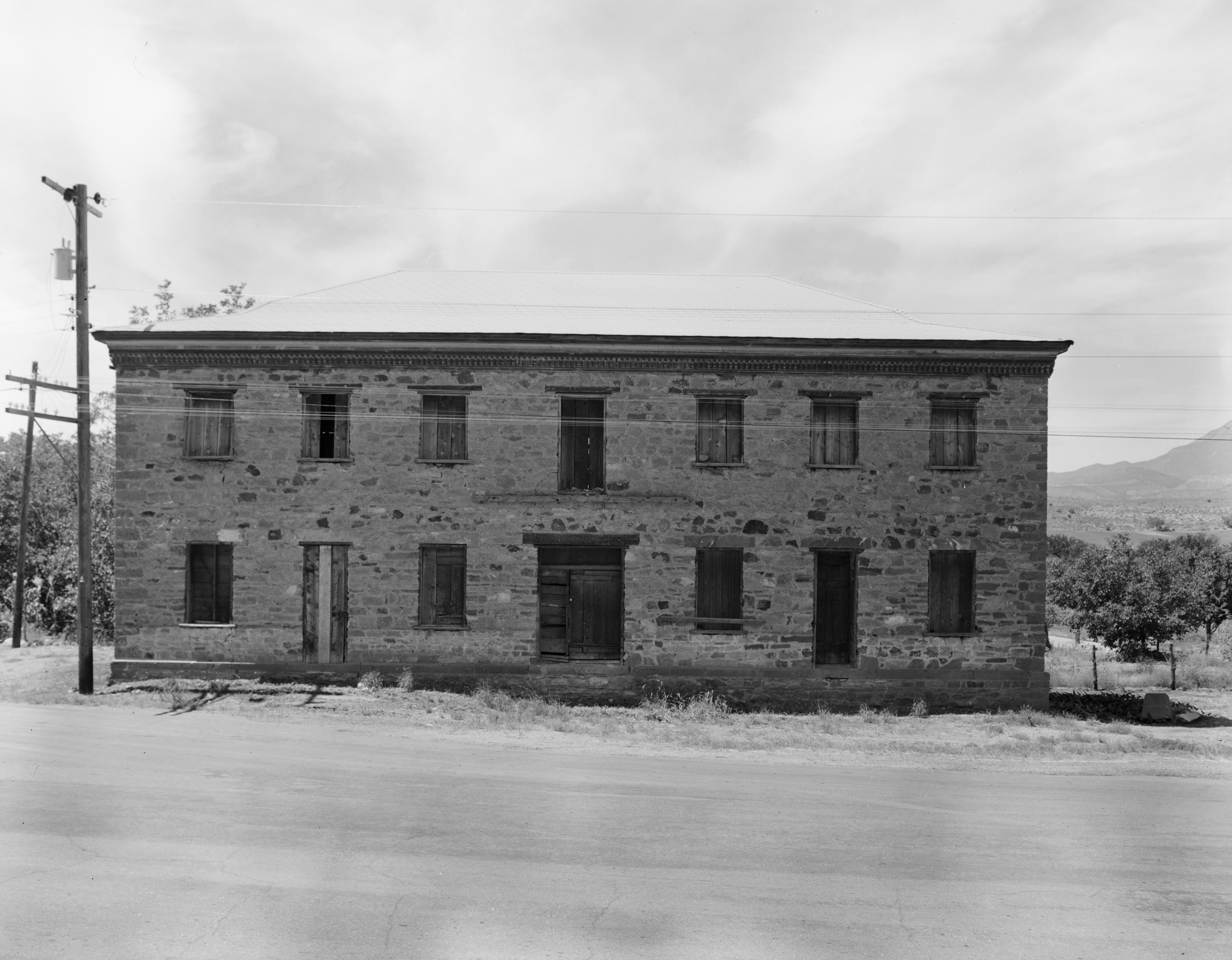
- The Naegle Winery in 1968

- Location within Utah Location within the United States
- Location: Main and 5th Sts., Toquerville, Utah
- Coordinates: 37.24888°N 113.28397°W
- Area: less than one acre
- Built: 1868
- Built by: Naegle, John C.
- NRHP reference No.: 80003990
- Added to NRHP: February 20, 1980

The Naegle Winery, also known as the Naile House, was built beginning in 1866 in Toquerville, Utah for German immigrant John C. Naegle, who moved to southern Utah after making a small fortune in gold panning in California. Naegle made sacramental wine for the Church of Jesus Christ of Latter-day Saints (LDS Church) until wine was discontinued by the church in the late 19th century. The wine industry declined and the winery was converted to can figs, and later to process peaches.

The rectangular two story sandstone building measures about 65 feet (20 m) by 33 feet (10 m). It has a full basement and a shallow-pitched hip roof. Walls are coursed rubble, with dressed stone lintels, quoins and a water table. The roof eaves have a bracketed wood cornice. As built, the structure may have also served as a residence.

The Naegle Winery was placed on the National Register of Historic Places on February 20, 1980.

== See also ==
Other historic Toquerville properties:

- Thomas Forsyth House
- John Steele House
