= Bullfrog Creek =

Stream in Garfield County, Utah, U.S.

Coordinates: 37.5949901°N 110.7834801°W

Bullfrog Creek is a stream in Garfield County, Utah, United States. It empties into the Bullfrog Basin and is part of the Colorado River watershed.

Bullfrog Creek was named from the bullfrogs who inhabited the creek.

== See also ==
- List of rivers of Utah
