= Sulphur Creek (Fremont River) =

Coordinates: 38°17′10″N 111°14′43″W

Sulphur Creek is a slot canyon canyoneering route found in Capitol Reef National Park in Utah, United States.

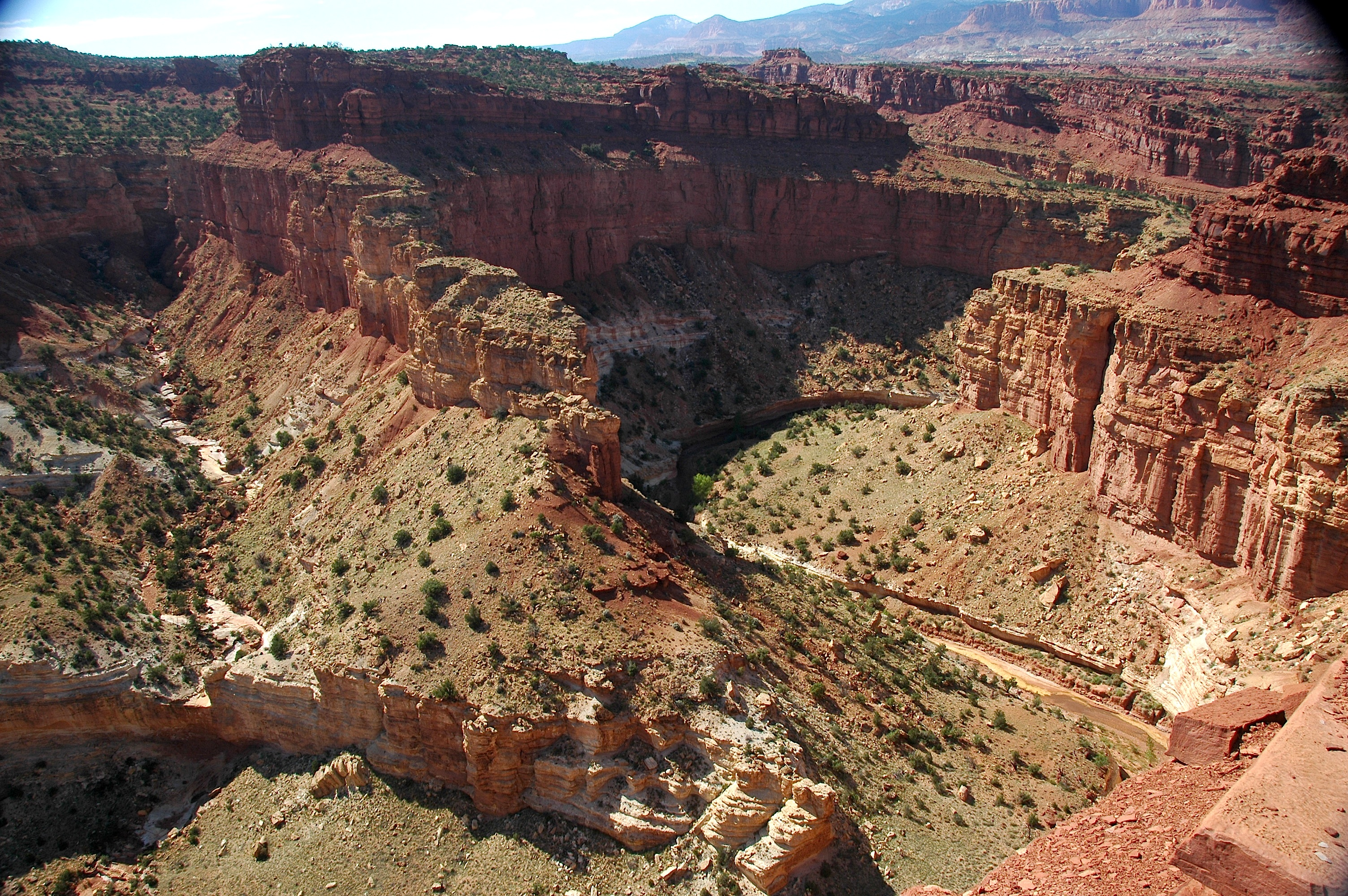
Canyons above the creek

It is a 6.25 mile hike one way and has been categorized by the state of Utah as an easy hiking trail. The canyon contains waterfalls, pools, overhangs and red sandstone, and a shallow stream that runs through it year-round. The route begins from near the Chimney Rock trailhead and ends at the Visitor Center. The rocks at Sulphur Creek are some of the oldest exposed rocks in Capitol Reef.

Sulphur Creek empties into the Fremont River at the town of Fruita, located within Capitol Reef National Park.

== History ==
During the building of the Transcontinental Railroad, David Kimball, Herber Kimball and W. Riley Judd sub-contracted to build part of the railroad along Sulphur Creek

== See also ==
- List of rivers of Utah
