= Dalton Creek =

Stream in Morgan County, Utah, U.S.

Coordinates: 41°05′25″N 111°44′43″W

Dalton Creek is a stream in Morgan County, Utah, United States. A tributary of the Weber River, it is located within the Uinta-Wasatch-Cache National Forest and its mouth is about 1.75 miles (2.82 km) southeast of Peterson.

The stream has two main tributaries: the Left Hand Fork Dalton Creek and the Right Hand Fork Dalton Creek. The headwaters of all three creeks are just east of the ridge of the Wasatch Range (a few miles north of Francis Peak), which is also the borderline with Davis County, and all three flow east. Dalton Creek empties into the Weber River (at a point just west of Interstate 84), which in turn flows roughly northwest to empty into the Ogden Bay of the Great Salt Lake.

Dalton Creek was named for Ted Dalton, a pioneer settler.

== See also ==
- List of rivers of Utah
