= Fort Uncompahgre =

- Trading post and fort
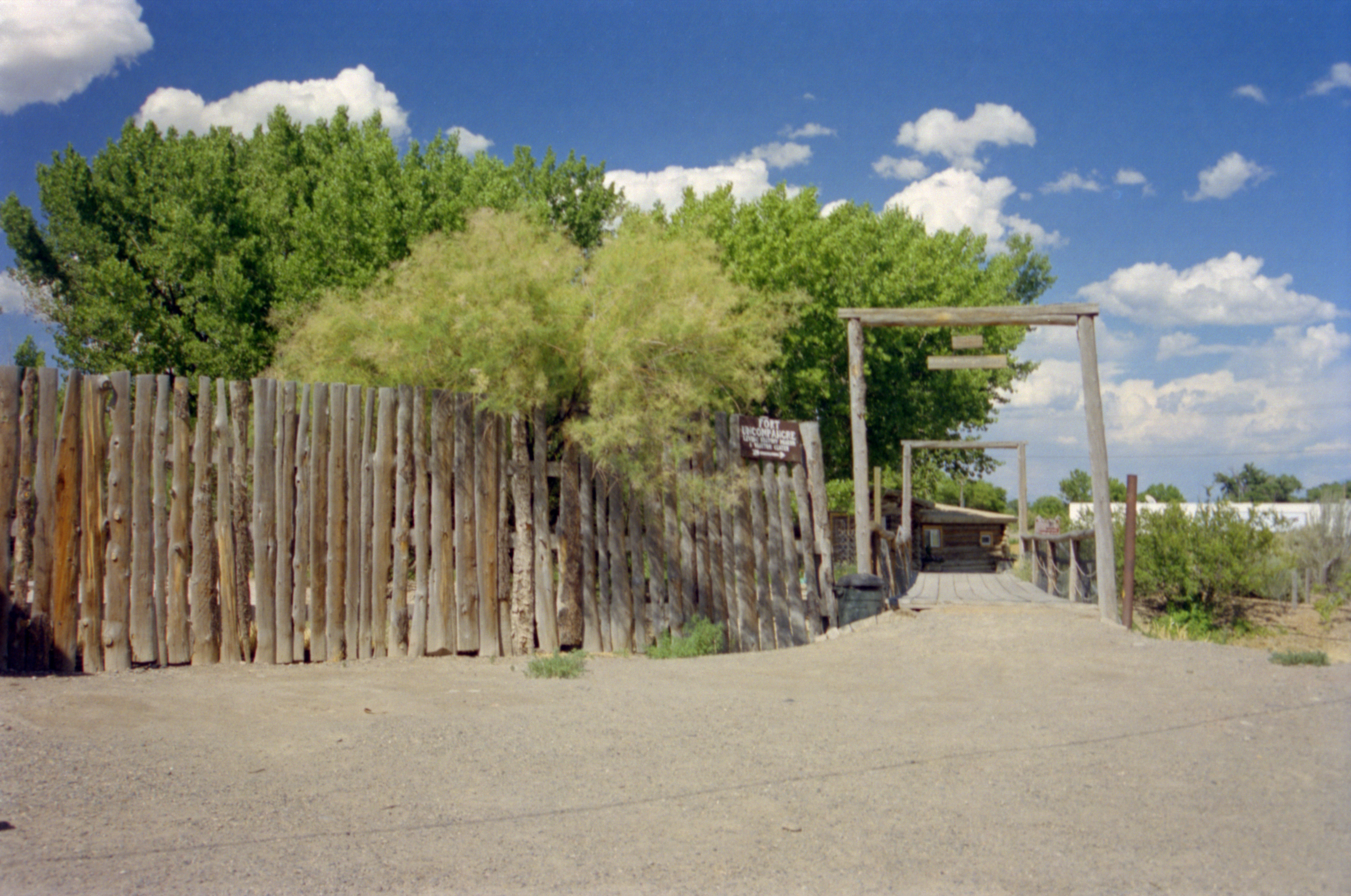
- The entrance to Fort Uncompahgre, originally built in 1828 and rebuilt in 1990
- Nickname: Fort Robidoux
- Location within Colorado
- Coordinates: 38.7494°N 108.0736°W
- Country: United States
- State: Colorado
- County: Delta
- Nearest town: Delta

Fort Uncompahgre was a fur trading post constructed in 1828 by Antoine Robidoux, a trader based out of Mexican Santa Fe. The post was situated about two miles down from the confluence of the Gunnison River and the Uncompahgre River, near the present day community of Delta, Colorado. Its design was more to secure goods and livestock than to be defensive, and was abandoned in 1844 when hostilities broke out between Ute and Mexicans.

In 1989–1990, local historian William Bailey headed up a group that reconstructed the fort. This reconstruction of the fur trading post is open to the public, although the precise location of the original site has been lost and little is known about the original construction or layout.

== See also ==
- History of Colorado
- Fort Robidoux, northeastern Utah
