= Crouse Creek =

Stream in Daggett County, Utah, U.S.

Coordinates: 40.8485714°N 109.0648447°W

Crouse Creek is a stream in the Uinta Mountains near the eastern edge of Daggett County, Utah, United States.

== Description ==
The creek is a distributary of the Pot Creek and branches off from that creek about 1.15 miles (1.85 km) due east of the Crouse Creek Dam and immediately east of the Uintah‑Daggett county line. From its source, the Crouse Creek flows north‑northeasterly through the Crouse Creek Canyon to empty into the Green River in Browns Park at the mouth of Swallow Canyon. (From the source of the Crouse Creek, the Pot Creek continues southeasterly to empty into the Green River in the Canyon of Lodore within the Dinosaur National Monument in northwest Colorado.)

Crouse Creek bears the name of Charles Crouse, an early rancher who settled at the stream's banks in 1880. However, the creek was previously known as Jimmie Reed Creek, named after a settler who built a cabin at the mouth of the stream in 1876.

== See also ==
- List of rivers of Utah
