= Uinta River =

Coordinates: 40°13′00″N 109°47′11″W

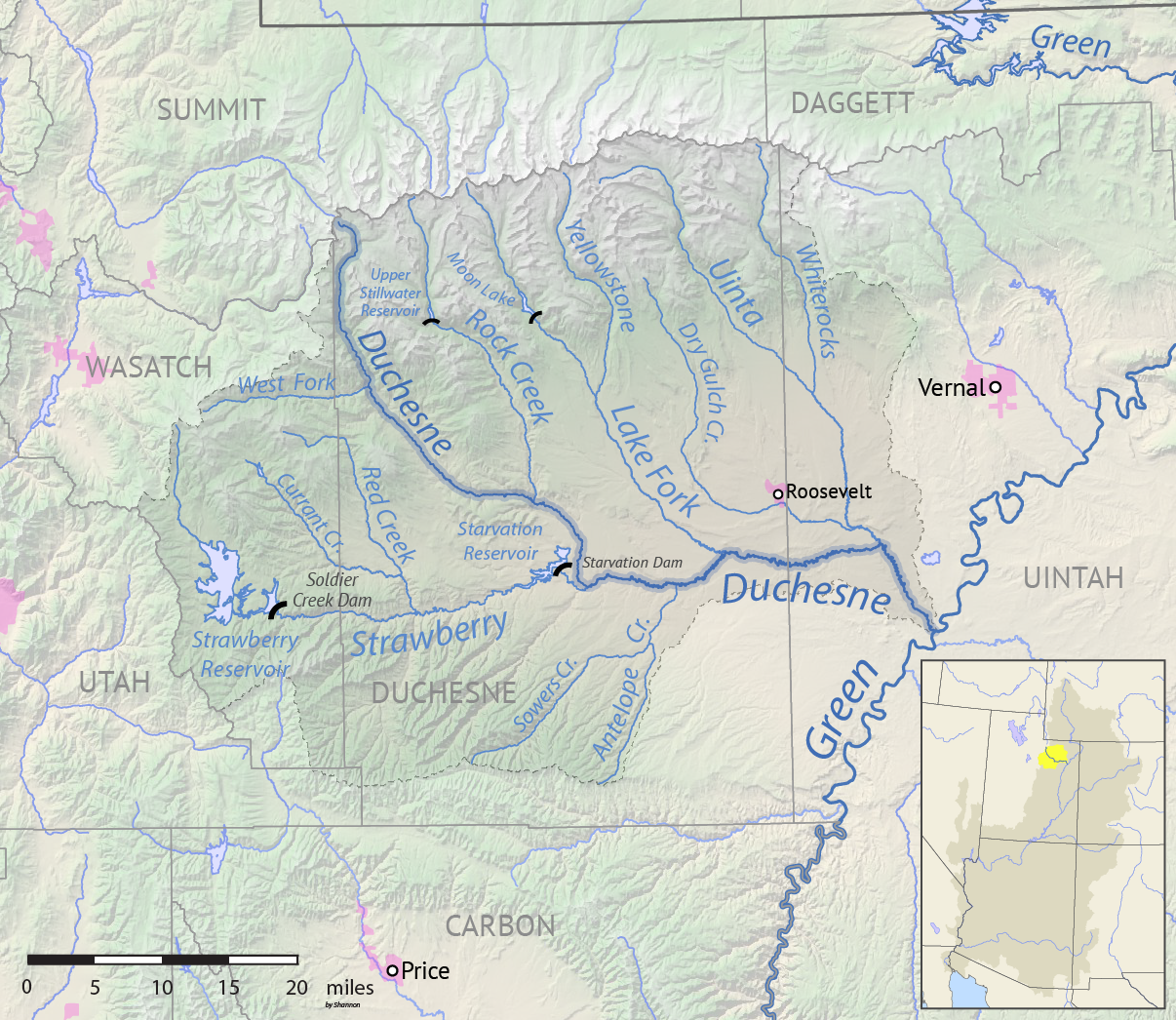
Map of the Duchesne drainage basin, with the Uinta River at right.

The Uinta River (historically also spelled Uintah River) is a tributary of the Duchesne River flowing through Duchesne and Uintah counties in Utah, United States. Originating in the Uinta Mountains, the river flows southeast for about 60 miles (97 km) to join the Duchesne near Randlett. The Uinta is an important source of water for local irrigation. Its tributaries include the Whiterocks River, which joins it near Whiterocks, and the Dry Gulch Creek near Fort Duchesne.

== See also ==
- List of rivers of Utah
- List of tributaries of the Colorado River
