= Ouray, Utah =

Unincorporated community in the state of Utah, United States

- Unincorporated community
- Location of Ouray within the State of Utah Ouray (the United States)
- Coordinates: 40°05′21″N 109°40′38″W
- Country: United States
- State: Utah
- County: Uintah
- Named for: Chief Ouray
- Elevation: 4,675 ft (1,425 m)
- Time zone: UTC-7 (Mountain (MST))
  - Summer (DST): UTC-6 (MDT)
- ZIP Code: 84026
- Area code: 435
- GNIS feature ID: 1431039

Ouray /ˈjʊəreɪ/ is an unincorporated community in west‑central Uintah County, Utah, United States.

== Description ==
The community is located primarily on the north bank of the confluence of the Duchesne and Green rivers at an elevation of 4,675 feet (1,425 m). (The confluence of the Green and White rivers is approximately 1.5 miles [2.4 km] further south.) Ouray is situated within the Uintah and Ouray Indian Reservation at the southern terminus of State Route 88, about 26.5 miles (42.6 km) south-southwest of Vernal.

The community is the second oldest modern settlement within the Uinta Basin and was named in honor of Chief Ouray, a Native American chief of the Uncompahgre band of the Ute tribe. In the Ute language, "Ouray" means arrow.

== History ==
The area was first settled by Europeans in the early 1830s when a trading post was established by French fur trader, Antoine Robidoux. The trading post was also known as Antoine Robidoux' Fort. Although he moved the trading post further north within a few years, the settlement remained in use and became known as Fort Kit Carson. (Some of the remains of structures from this earlier settlement still exist.)

Decades later, in 1881, an Indian agency for the Uncompahgre band of the Utes was established and included a post office for the area. At that time the settlement received its current name of Ouray. In response to the Meeker Massacre in Colorado in 1879, Fort Thornburgh was built in the area in 1886, but was moved to near the present day Vernal less than a year later. (However, the "new" Fort Thornburgh was abandoned several years after that when it was replaced by Fort Duchesne at the present site of Fort Duchesne.)

Even with the abandonment of the forts in the area, the community still prospered. However, by the late 1920s the population began to slowly decline. By December 1964, the post office finally closed.

== Climate ==
Ouray has a cold semi-arid climate (BSk) with short but cold winters and long, hot summers. Precipitation is sparse year round.

Climate data for Ouray, Utah, 1991–2020 normals, extremes 1941–present
Month	Jan	Feb	Mar	Apr	May	Jun	Jul	Aug	Sep	Oct	Nov	Dec	Year
Record high °F (°C)	62 (17)	68 (20)	82 (28)	90 (32)	100 (38)	106 (41)	108 (42)	105 (41)	101 (38)	90 (32)	81 (27)	63 (17)	108 (42)
Mean maximum °F (°C)	43.7 (6.5)	54.5 (12.5)	72.2 (22.3)	82.0 (27.8)	90.9 (32.7)	99.4 (37.4)	102.4 (39.1)	99.2 (37.3)	93.9 (34.4)	82.4 (28.0)	63.3 (17.4)	47.4 (8.6)	102.9 (39.4)
Mean daily maximum °F (°C)	28.7 (−1.8)	39.2 (4.0)	56.5 (13.6)	66.5 (19.2)	77.1 (25.1)	88.7 (31.5)	95.1 (35.1)	91.8 (33.2)	82.1 (27.8)	66.5 (19.2)	48.5 (9.2)	32.1 (0.1)	64.4 (18.0)
Daily mean °F (°C)	16.8 (−8.4)	26.2 (−3.2)	41.5 (5.3)	50.6 (10.3)	60.5 (15.8)	70.1 (21.2)	76.7 (24.8)	73.6 (23.1)	63.9 (17.7)	49.9 (9.9)	35.0 (1.7)	20.9 (−6.2)	48.8 (9.3)
Mean daily minimum °F (°C)	5.0 (−15.0)	13.1 (−10.5)	26.4 (−3.1)	34.8 (1.6)	43.9 (6.6)	51.6 (10.9)	58.3 (14.6)	55.4 (13.0)	45.6 (7.6)	33.3 (0.7)	21.5 (−5.8)	9.7 (−12.4)	33.2 (0.7)
Mean minimum °F (°C)	−13.2 (−25.1)	−6.5 (−21.4)	12.8 (−10.7)	22.5 (−5.3)	31.3 (−0.4)	40.0 (4.4)	49.1 (9.5)	45.9 (7.7)	33.3 (0.7)	20.0 (−6.7)	7.5 (−13.6)	−8.3 (−22.4)	−16.6 (−27.0)
Record low °F (°C)	−43 (−42)	−41 (−41)	−18 (−28)	6 (−14)	8 (−13)	30 (−1)	38 (3)	32 (0)	20 (−7)	−1 (−18)	−10 (−23)	−40 (−40)	−43 (−42)
Average precipitation inches (mm)	0.34 (8.6)	0.33 (8.4)	0.49 (12)	0.73 (19)	0.84 (21)	0.40 (10)	0.56 (14)	0.64 (16)	0.93 (24)	0.92 (23)	0.42 (11)	0.43 (11)	7.03 (178)
Average snowfall inches (cm)	4.4 (11)	3.1 (7.9)	1.1 (2.8)	0.5 (1.3)	0.0 (0.0)	0.0 (0.0)	0.0 (0.0)	0.0 (0.0)	0.0 (0.0)	0.4 (1.0)	1.3 (3.3)	4.7 (12)	15.5 (39.3)
Average precipitation days (≥ 0.01 in)	3.7	3.3	3.6	4.9	5.2	2.8	3.3	4.4	4.5	4.4	2.7	3.4	46.2
Average snowy days (≥ 0.1 in)	3.0	1.8	0.7	0.3	0.0	0.0	0.0	0.0	0.0	0.5	0.5	2.6	9.4
Source 1: NOAA
Source 2: National Weather Service
