= Whiterocks, Utah =

Whiterocks
- CDP
- Location in Uintah County and the state of Utah
- Coordinates: 40°28′3″N 109°55′47″W
- Country: United States
- State: Utah
- County: Uintah
- Founded: 1868
- Named for: Whiterocks River

Area
  - Total: 2.4 sq mi (6.1 km^{2})
  - Land: 2.4 sq mi (6.1 km^{2})
  - Water: 0 sq mi (0.0 km^{2})
- Elevation: 6,033 ft (1,839 m)

Population (2020)
  - Total: 221
  - Density: 94/sq mi (36/km^{2})
- Time zone: UTC-7 (Mountain (MST))
  - Summer (DST): UTC-6 (MDT)
- ZIP code: 84085
- Area code: 435
- FIPS code: 49-84160
- GNIS feature ID: 1434208

Whiterocks is a census-designated place (CDP) in Uintah County, Utah, United States. The population was 221 at the 2020 census, a decrease of the 2010 population of 289. In 1828, one of Utah's first European-American trading posts, Fort Robidoux, was established on the outskirts of modern Whiterocks.

== Geography ==
Whiterocks is located at 40°28′3″N 109°55′47″W (40.467560, -109.929607).

According to the United States Census Bureau, the CDP has a total area of 2.3 square miles (6.0 km^{2}), all land.

== Demographics ==
Historical population
Census	Pop.	Note	%±
1910	1,349		—
1920	232		−82.8%
1930	784		237.9%
1940	601		−23.3%
1950	481		−20.0%
1990	312		—
2000	341		9.3%
2010	289		−15.2%
2020	221		−23.5%
Source: U.S. Census Bureau

As of the census of 2000, there were 341 people, 92 households, and 78 families residing in the CDP. The population density was 145.1 people per square mile (56.0/km^{2}). There were 96 housing units at an average density of 40.8/sq mi (15.8/km^{2}). The racial makeup of the CDP was 5.57% White, 93.84% Native American, and 0.59% from two or more races. Hispanic or Latino of any race were 0.88% of the population.

There were 92 households, out of which 47.8% had children under the age of 18 living with them, 31.5% were married couples living together, 47.8% had a female householder with no husband present, and 15.2% were non-families. 10.9% of all households were made up of individuals, and 1.1% had someone living alone who was 65 years of age or older. The average household size was 3.71 and the average family size was 4.03.

In the CDP, the population was spread out, with 41.6% under the age of 18, 13.2% from 18 to 24, 25.8% from 25 to 44, 15.8% from 45 to 64, and 3.5% who were 65 years of age or older. The median age was 22 years. For every 100 females, there were 80.4 males. For every 100 females age 18 and over, there were 76.1 males.

The median income for a household in the CDP was $10,417, and the median income for a family was $15,156. Males had a median income of $21,750 versus $15,833 for females. The per capita income for the CDP was $3,920. About 63.4% of families and 70.9% of the population were below the poverty line, including 81.1% of those under age 18 and 90.0% of those age 65 or over.

== History ==
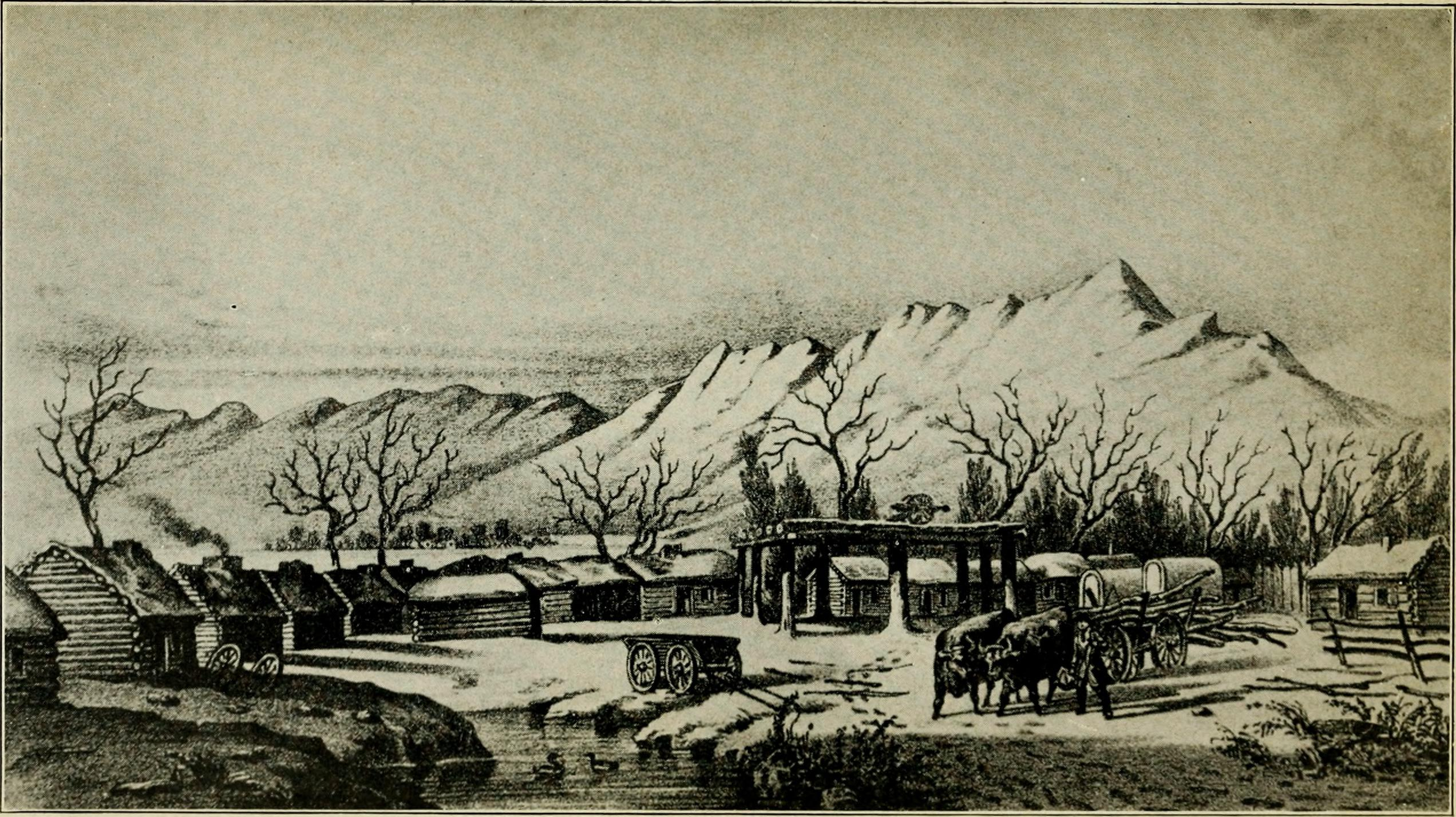
Fort Robidoux in the 1830s

1828 Four French traders from Kentucky -- William "Toopeechee" Reed, Jim Reed, Dennis Julien, and Augustus Archambeaux -- entered the Uintah Basin and set up a trading post near a spring of water just south and east of the present settlement of Whiterocks. The site was at a junction of trails used by the local Ute people. They brought in the first butcher knives, coffee beans, and other articles traded to the locals for fur. Antoine Robidoux (or Rubidoux) purchased the enterprise in 1832 and built a larger "fort" just east of the post named Fort Robidoux (or Fort Uinta). In 1844, Utes burned the trading post to the ground and it was not rebuilt.

October 3, 1861 By order of Abraham Lincoln and the secretary of the Interior the "Uintah Valley in the Territory of Utah, be set apart and reserved for the use and occupancy of Indian Tribes."

1868 Amos Reed, a government clerk in the employment of the Indian Service, made a trip to Whiterocks. His guide, Chief Antero, said that since he was to be moved to the Uintah Reservation he would choose Whiterocks for his home, and he suggested to Mr. Reed that the Indian Agency be established at that place. His reason for his choice was that Whiterocks was located in the center of the Basin. Here the local Utes were used to staying. Here traders and trappers had established posts and headquarters. Many trails led to and from it, and here the site had a lovely natural setting. On the recommendation of Chief Antero, the agency was moved from Rock Creek to Whiterocks on Christmas Day 1868.

== Archaeology ==
Whiterocks is near the site of the eponymous "Whiterocks Village," a Uinta Fremont village partially excavated in 1966 by Wayne F. Shields, assigned on the basis of architecture and radiocarbon dates to the Whiterocks Phase, A.D. 800-950. The excavated portion consisted of four round pithouses, 12-18 square feet in size, and a rectangular granary 25 by 29.5 feet in dimensions featuring coursed adobe walls. Of the four dwellings, two had masonry walls and central firepits, while the other two had single stone walls and no firepits. One fragmentary burial with two disarticulated skeletons was reportedly found but not described in the published report.

The site is notable for a high frequency of Uinta Gray pottery sherds; 5,675 potsherds were recovered, 5,540 of which were interpreted as Uinta Gray, a diagnostic style of the Uinta Fremont characterized by calcite temper. Other artifacts included chipped and ground stone tools, shells, nine corncobs, beans, and bone tools.

The site is on the National Register of Historic Places. Much of the surface of the site was under cultivation at the time of excavation and was presumed to have been largely destroyed by agricultural activity.

== See also ==
- List of census-designated places in Utah
