= Antoine Robidoux =

19th century French-Canadian fur trader

Antoine Robidoux (September 24, 1794 – August 29, 1860) was a fur trapper and trader of French-Canadian descent best known for his exploits in the American Southwest in the first half of the 19th century.

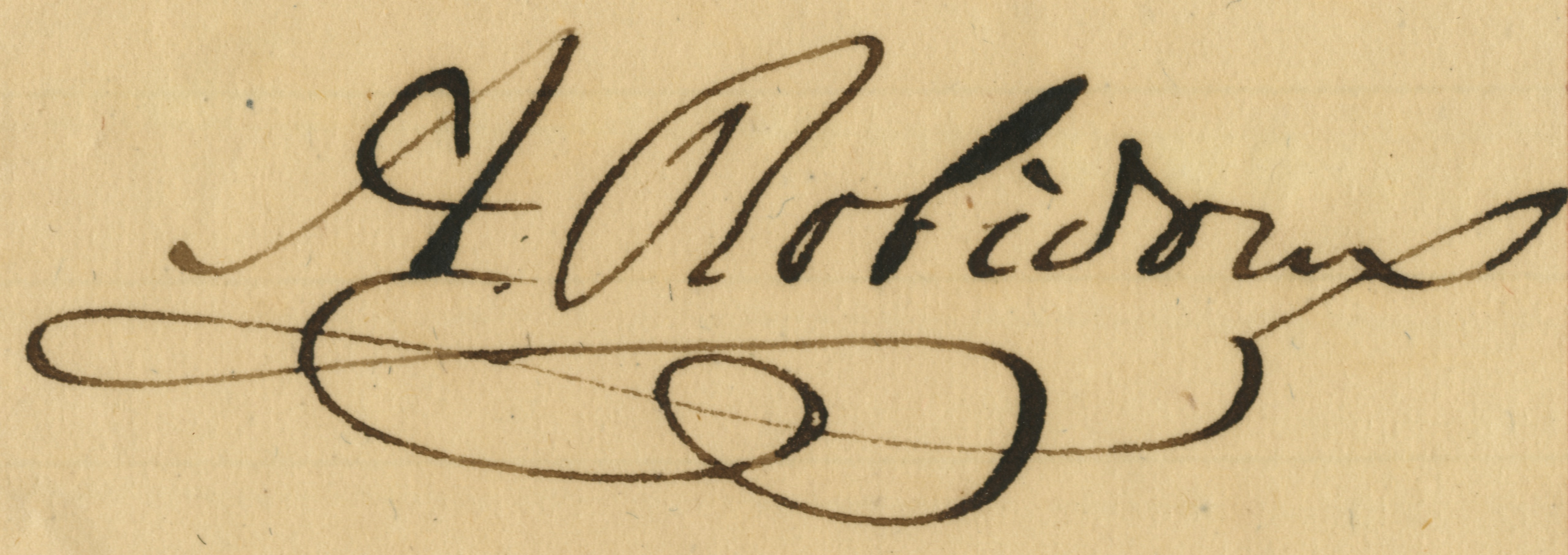
Signature of Antoine Robidoux in 1845

== Early life ==
Robidoux was born in 1794 in Saint Louis, the fourth of six sons of Joseph Robidoux III, the owner of a Saint Louis-based fur trading company, and his wife Catherine Marie Rollet dit Laderoute. The Robidoux family is strongly connected to the history of the North American fur trade, with all of Joseph Robidoux's sons having participated to one degree or another in the family business. One of Antoine's five brothers, Joseph Robidoux IV, established the Blacksnake Hills Trading Post that eventually became the town of St. Joseph, Missouri.

In his early years he helped his father extend his business westward, and by the 1820s was focused on developing trade routes in the intermountain corridors of what was at the time the Mexican province of Santa Fe de Nuevo México. In the summer of 1824, Antoine may have joined a party led by Etienne Provost that traveled to the Uinta Basin to trade for pelts. He eventually established a permanent residence in the capital city of Santa Fe, and in 1828, he took for his common-law wife Carmel Benevides (1812–1888), the daughter of a Spanish captain who was killed fighting the Comanche and subsequently the adopted daughter of the provincial governor. The couple adopted a girl, Carmelete, who married Isador Barada. Barada and his brother Edmund were arrested in 1849 for illegally operating a gaming house and fined $50 each. Their subsequent appeal to the Missouri Supreme Court resulted in a reversal of their conviction.

In 1829, Antoine and his younger brother Louis Robidoux petitioned for and were granted Mexican citizenship, which freed them to trade and settle in Mexican territory without having to worry about expensive tariffs and other international restrictions, as well as near-exclusive license to trap and trade in the Ute country of what is now western Colorado and eastern Utah. By 1830, Antoine had become a prominent citizen of Santa Fe in social and economic circles. He was even elected the first non-Mexican alcalde of the ayuntamiento (the municipal council), though his political career was short-lived.

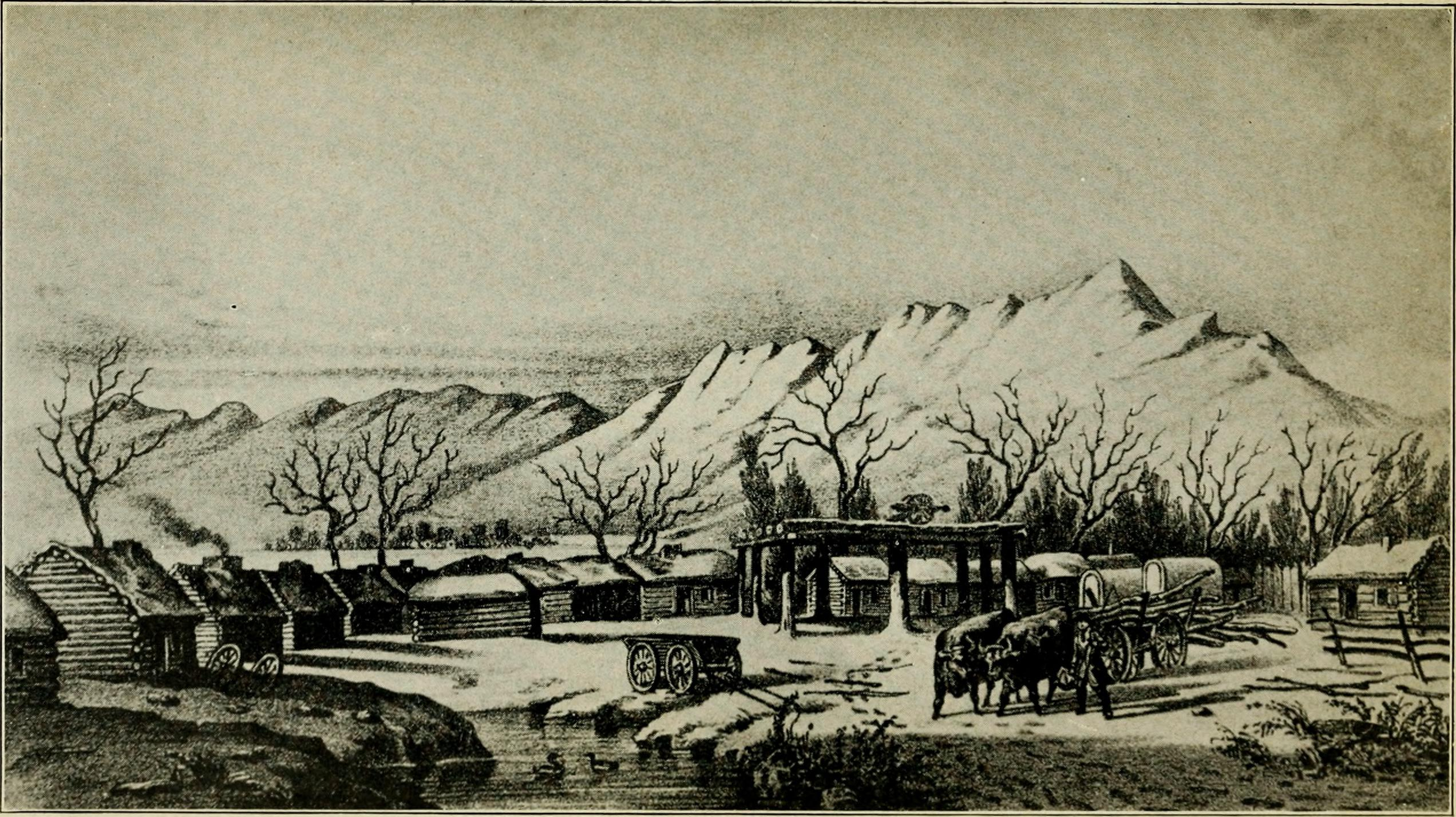
Fort Robidoux in the 1830s.

Around the same time, and possibly in partnership with Louis, Antoine established Fort Uncompahgre near the confluence of the Gunnison River (then known as the Río San Xavier) and the Uncompahgre River in west-central Colorado. Though the exact date of its completion is unknown, Robidoux's post was arguably the first permanent trading operation west of the continental divide. In 1832, Robidoux purchased the Reed Trading Post, a single cabin built by William Reed and Denis Julien four years earlier at the confluence of the Uinta and Whiterocks rivers in northeastern Utah, and rebuilt it much larger as Fort Robidoux, also called Fort Uintah and Fort Winty. The fort was visited by many well-known pioneers and mountain men during its years of operation, including Marcus Whitman, Miles Goodyear, and Kit Carson.

== Westwater Canyon inscription ==
Robidoux spent more than a decade managing both trading posts and exploring the Western interior. He is especially well known for having carved a famous rock inscription on a wall of Utah's Westwater Canyon during this time. Likely ascending a trapper's trail from the canyon's mouth on the Colorado River, Robidoux left the following record of his presence engraved on a sandstone bluff:

ANTOINE ROBIDOUX

PASSE ICI LE 13 NOVEMBRE

1837

POUR ETABLIRE MAISON

TRAITTE A LA

RV. VERT OUWIYTÉ

The inscription was not again brought to public attention until 1933, when Charles Kelly first photographed it. It has since yielded many interpretations in attempts to more accurately pinpoint the precise dates of Robidoux's operations in the area. The most direct translation from the French reads "Antoine Robidoux passed here 13 November 1837 to establish a trading post at the Green OUWIYTÉ River", but the accuracy of this translation has been a matter of controversy among historians.

Specifically, it has been suggested that the word "Wiyté" was actually intended to read "Winté", and that deterioration has made the appearance of the third letter ambiguous; though the Green and the White are both names for rivers in Utah, "Winté" may instead be a reference to the Uinta River, which was at the time commonly called the "Winty". If this alternative translation is correct, then the inscription appears to suggest that Robidoux had not yet established a trading post on the Uinta River by 1837. This contradicts evidence that he purchased and rebuilt the Reed Trading Post on the Uinta River in 1832, five years earlier.

A simple solution is that the year engraved in the inscription has also been misinterpreted, and that the original message reads "1831" instead of "1837"; this would be a logical fit with the notion that Robidoux may have been searching for a place to establish a new trading post in late 1831, shortly before he eventually did so when he bought the Reed Trading Post. Yet there is evidence that Antoine Robidoux was actually in Missouri selling furs and procuring supplies in November 1831, making it impossible for him to have carved the inscription at that time.

A third solution is that 1837 is actually correct and that Robidoux was, in fact, planning to build a third, unidentified trading post in a new location at the time, which either never materialized or was built and subsequently lost to history.

There's no space between the"OU" and the "WIYTÉ" words on the inscription they form only one word "OUWIYTÉ" reading in French pronunciation "Uweetah" or "Uintah" closest spelling in English writing. It also make sense as the Uintah River is the closest affluent on the green River ("RV. VERT" on the inscription).

1837 seems also the best date interpretation since the French Canadians and pioneers never wrote the number Ones like in France to avoid misinterpretation between Ones and Sevens. If Robidoux wanted to write 1831, he would have carved the first "1" exactly like the last "1" which is clearly not the case.

== Later life ==
Both Fort Uncompahgre and Fort Robidoux were evidently attacked and destroyed by Utes in 1844, just as the fur trade was declining with changes in the European market. These circumstances prompted Robidoux to quickly abandon his fur enterprise and return east to St. Joseph. Over the next decade, he worked in various capacities as an emigrant guide and a U.S. Army interpreter. In June 1846, Robidoux enlisted as an interpreter with General Stephen W. Kearny's expedition to California during the Mexican–American War. He was severely wounded at the Battle of San Pasqual in December, and later applied for a government pension.

Robidoux died in 1860 in St. Joseph, Missouri, at the age of 65.
