= Ashley Creek (Utah) =

Stream in Utah, U.S.

Coordinates: 40°20′30″N 109°21′53″W

Ashley Creek is a stream in the U.S. state of Utah. It is a tributary of the Green River.

Ashley Creek has the name of William Henry Ashley (1778–1838), a frontiersman, entrepreneur, and politician. A variant name was "Ashley's Fork".

== See also ==
- List of rivers of Utah
