= List of rivers of Utah =

This is a list of rivers in the U.S. state of Utah in the United States, sorted by watershed.

== Colorado River ==
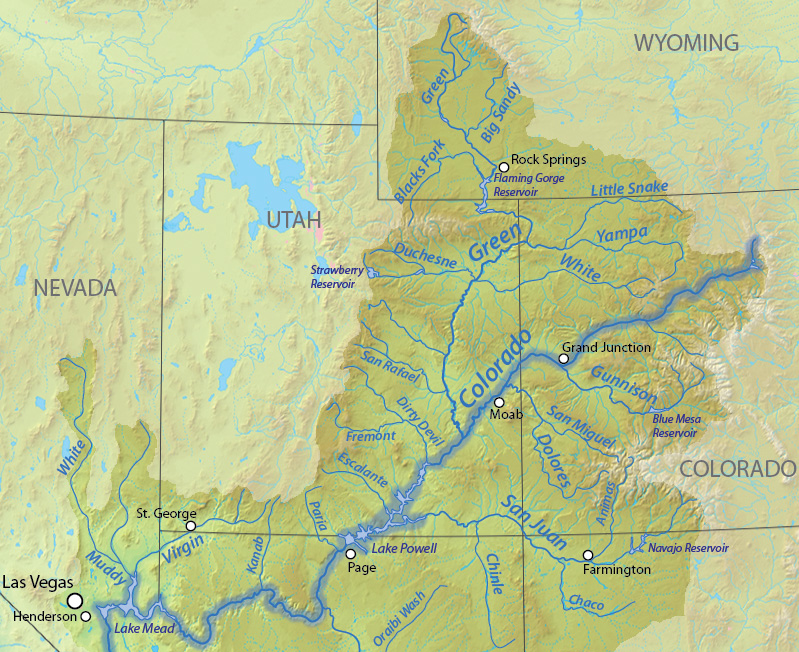
Watershed of the Colorado River

The Colorado River is a major river in the Western United States, emptying into the Gulf of California. Rivers are listed upstream by the point they empty into the Colorado.

- Meadow Valley Wash (located entirely in Nevada, but its watershed has several extremely small portions in Utah)
- Virgin River
  - Beaver Dam Wash
  - Santa Clara River
  - Ash Creek
  - Fort Pearce Wash
  - East Fork Virgin River
  - North Fork Virgin River
- Kanab Creek
- Paria River
  - Buckskin Gulch
- San Juan River
  - Chinle Creek
  - Montezuma Creek
  - McElmo Creek
- Escalante River
  - Coyote Gulch
- Bullfrog Creek
- Dirty Devil River
  - Fremont River
    - Sulphur Creek
      - Sand Creek
  - Muddy Creek
- Green River
  - San Rafael River
    - Huntington Creek
    - Cottonwood Creek
    - Ferron Creek
  - Price River
    - White River
  - Range Creek
  - Willow Creek
  - White River
  - Duchesne River
    - Uinta River
      - Whiterocks River
    - Lake Fork River
      - Yellowstone River (Utah)
        - Yellowstone Creek
        - Swift Creek (Utah)
    - Strawberry River
  - Ashley Creek
  - Brush Creek
  - Jones Hole Creek (Diamond Gulch)
  - Crouse Creek
  - Cart Creek
  - Carter Creek
  - Sheep Creek
  - Henrys Fork
  - Blacks Fork
    - Muddy Creek
- Kane Springs Creek
- Dolores River
  - La Sal Creek

== Great Salt Lake ==
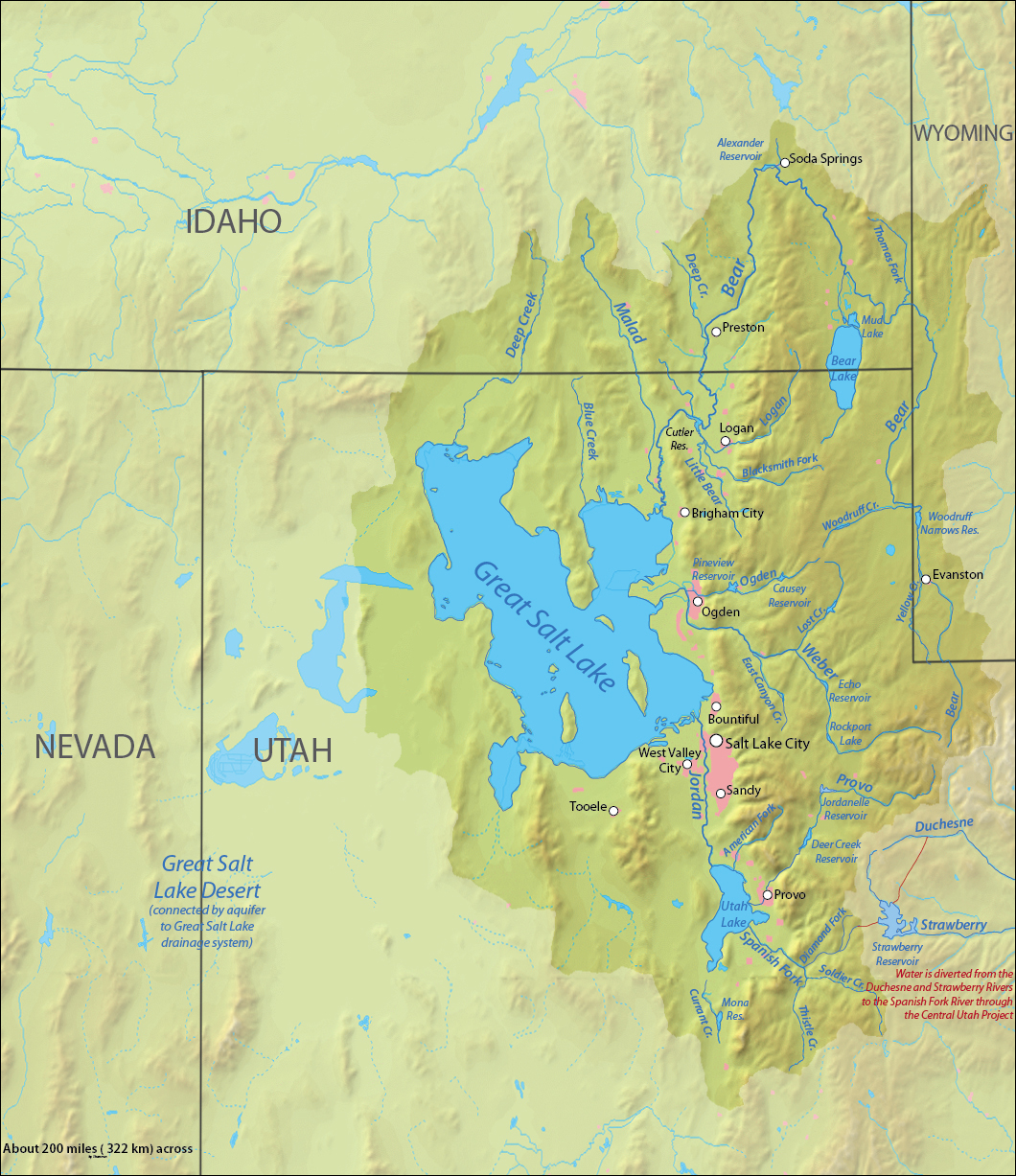
Watershed of the Great Salt Lake

The Great Salt Lake is the largest lake in the Great Basin. Rivers are listed in a clockwise direction.

- Bear River
  - Malad River
  - Little Bear River
    - Logan River
  - Cub River
  - Bear Lake
- Weber River
  - Mill Creek
  - Ogden River
  - Dalton Creek
  - East Canyon Creek
  - Cottonwood Creek
- Jordan River
  - City Creek
  - Red Butte
  - Emigration Creek
  - Parley's Creek
  - Mill Creek
  - Big Cottonwood Creek
  - Little Cottonwood Creek
  - Bingham Creek
  - Willow Creek
  - Midas Creek
  - Dry Creek
  - Utah Lake
    - Dry Creek
    - American Fork
    - Provo River
    - Hobble Creek
    - Dry Creek
    - Spanish Fork
    - Peteetneet Creek (no longer reaches Utah Lake)
    - Current Creek
      - West Creek
      - Kimball Creek

== Other Great Basin ==
A number of other drainage systems are located in the Great Basin.

- Curlew Valley
- Escalante Desert
- Great Salt Lake Desert
  - Miry Wash
    - Grouse Creek
      - Thousand Springs Creek
- Hamlin Valley
- Pilot Creek Valley
- Pine Valley
- Rush Valley
  - Harker Creek
- Sevier Lake
  - Sevier River
    - Beaver River
    - San Pitch River
    - Mammoth Creek
    - Clear Creek
    - East Fork Sevier River
- Skull Valley
- Snake Valley
- Tooele Valley
- Tule Valley
- Wah Wah Valley

== Snake River ==
The Snake River, which flows into the Pacific Ocean via the Columbia River, does not enter Utah, but some of its tributaries drain northwestern Utah.

- Death Creek
- Goose Creek
- Raft River

== See also ==
- List of rivers in the Great Basin
- List of rivers in the United States
- List of canyons and gorges in Utah
