= Unimpaired runoff =

Unimpaired runoff, also known as full natural flow, is a hydrology term for the natural runoff of a watershed or waterbody that would have occurred under current land use but without dams or diversions. Flow readings from river gauges are influenced by upstream diversions, impoundments, and many other alterations of the land that drains into a watershed or of alternatives of a river channel itself. Engineers estimate unimpaired or natural runoff by estimating all of the effects of human "impairments" to flow and then removing these effects. Since these calculations involve many assumptions, they tend to be more accurate for either smaller watersheds or when expressed as longer period averages.

Unimpaired runoff is important for legal and scientific reasons. Since human development continues to alter watersheds, unimpaired runoff provides fixed frames of references for flow rates. The reason unimpaired runoff is important is because long-term hydrologic records are often used to develop relationships between precipitation, runoff, and water supply. By removing changes in the timing between precipitation and runoff due to human influences, the long-term relationships will be more useful.

Calculating unimpaired runoff is also extremely important in identifying long-term climate change impacts. By subtracting the known water management influences on a long-term hydrologic record, the records may still show signs of a long-term change. These long-term signals may include long-term climate and land use change. It is still possible that the long-term climate signal is caused by larger scale anthropogenic sources.

== Examples of Use ==
Unimpaired runoff calculations are used extensively in western United States states such as California for water resources management applications, particularly in the calculation of water year classifications and river indexes.

The following is a list of some examples of use of unimpaired runoff calculations:

- Sacramento Valley 40-30-30 Index (California)
