= Whiterocks River =

Coordinates: 40°26′29″N 109°55′08″W

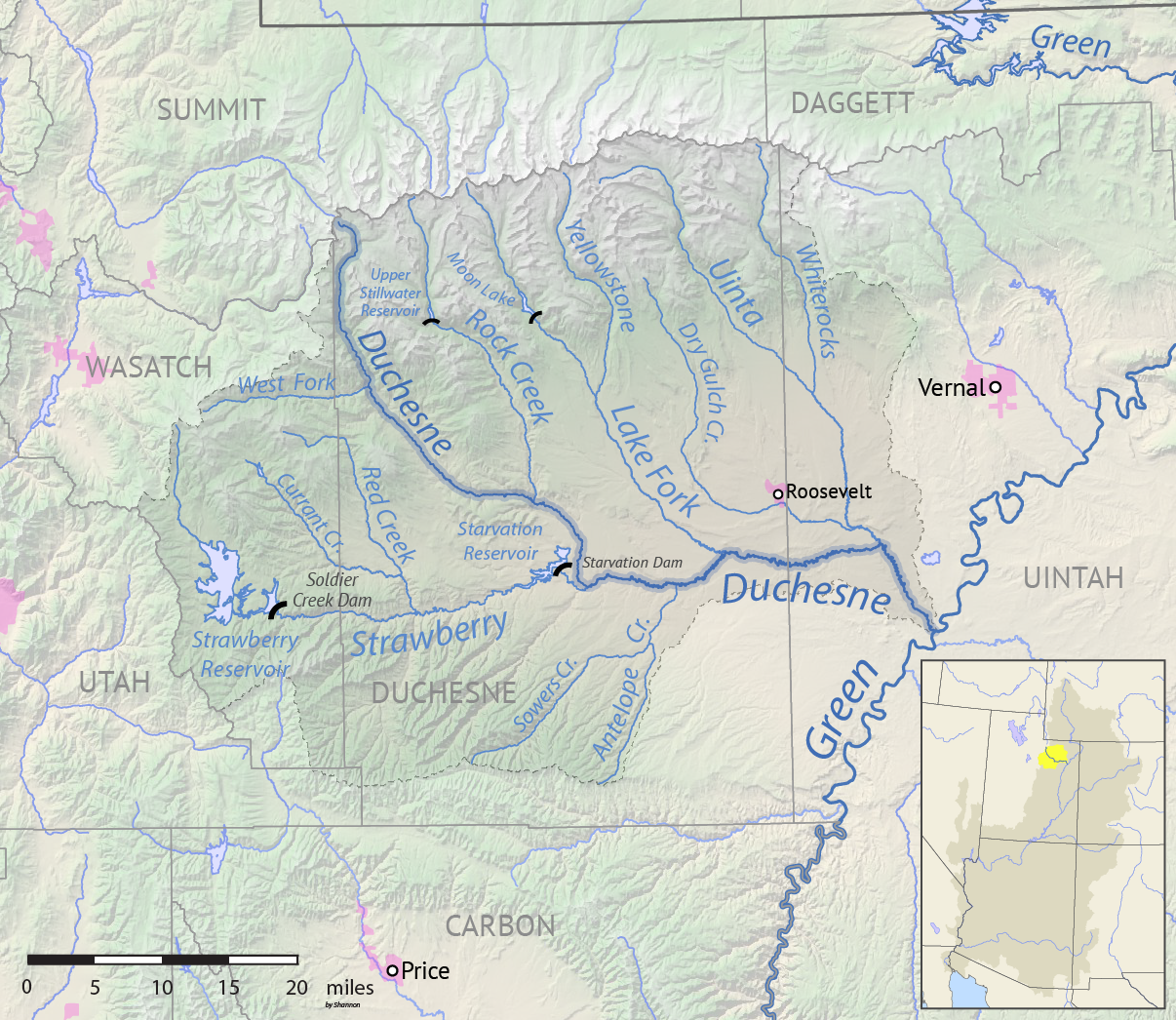
Map of the Duchesne drainage basin, showing the Whiterocks River joining the Uinta River at right.

The Whiterocks River is a river in Uintah and Duchesne counties in Utah, United States. It flows south for about 29 miles (47 km) from the Uinta Mountains to join the Uinta River, a tributary of the Duchesne River, near Whiterocks.

== See also ==
- List of rivers of Utah
- List of tributaries of the Colorado River
