= Ash Creek (Utah) =

Stream in northern Washington County, Utah, U.S.

Coordinates: 37°12′11″N 113°17′23″W

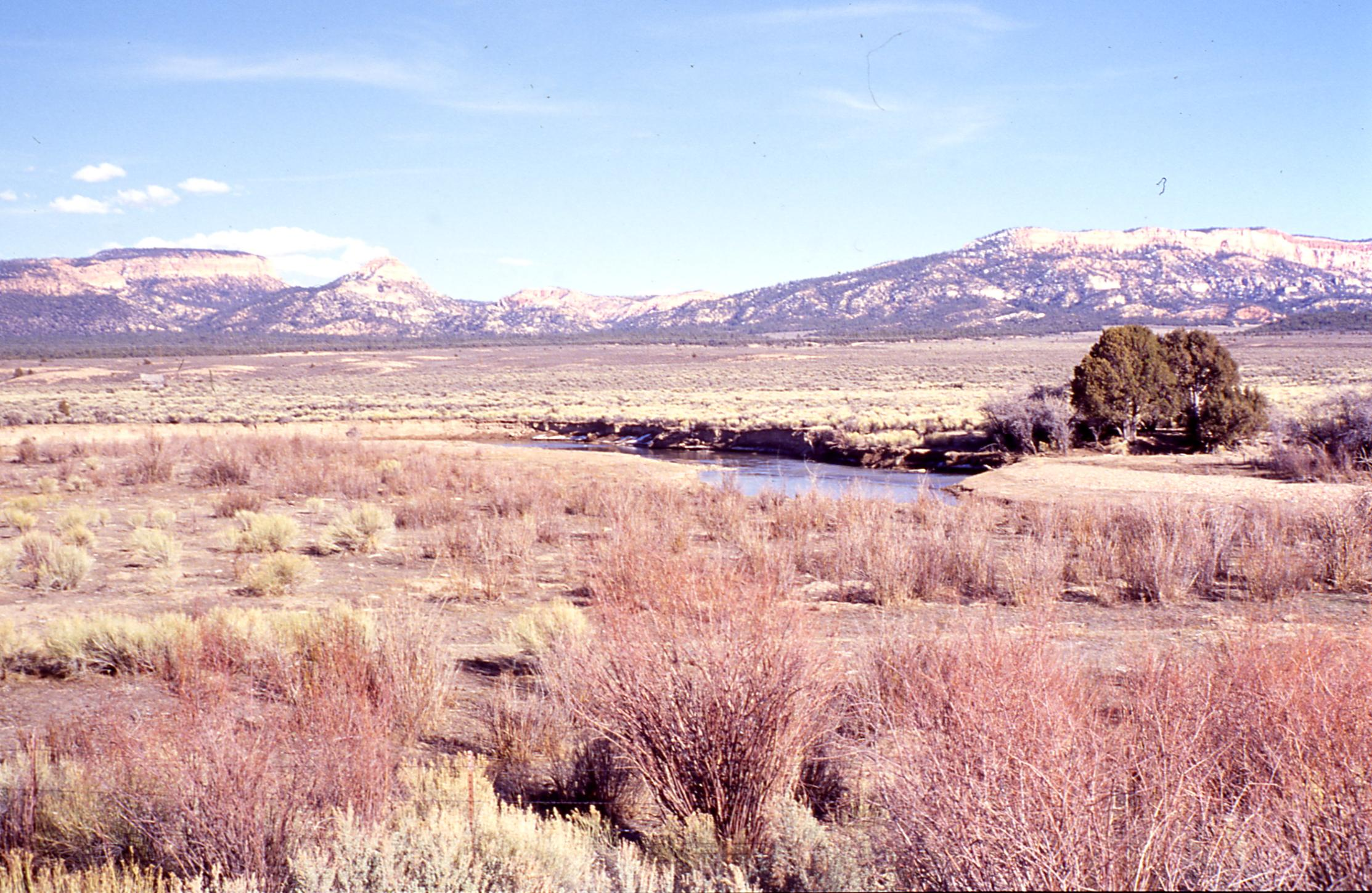
Looking east over Ash Creek in Pintura, with the Hurricane Cliffs in the distance, March 1990

Ash Creek is a stream in northern Washington County, Utah, United States. It is a tributary of the Virgin River. Ash Creek was named after the ash timber near its course.

== See also ==
- List of rivers of Utah
- List of tributaries of the Colorado River
