= Randlett, Utah =

- CDP
- Location in Uintah County and the state of Utah
- Coordinates: 40°14′2″N 109°49′21″W
- Country: United States
- State: Utah
- County: Uintah
- Settled: 1892
- Named for: James Randlett

Area
  - Total: 5.2 sq mi (13.5 km^{2})
  - Land: 5.2 sq mi (13.5 km^{2})
  - Water: 0 sq mi (0.0 km^{2})
- Elevation: 4,816 ft (1,468 m)

Population (2020)
  - Total: 184
  - Density: 35.3/sq mi (13.6/km^{2})
- Time zone: UTC-7 (Mountain (MST))
  - Summer (DST): UTC-6 (MDT)
- ZIP code: 84063
- Area code: 435
- FIPS code: 49-62910
- GNIS feature ID: 1431565

Randlett is a census-designated place (CDP) in west-central Uintah County, Utah, United States. In the 2000 census its population was 224, a 21% decrease from the 1990 figure of 283. By the 2020 census, the population further decreased to 184, which was also a decrease from the 2010 census result of 220 in addition.

Randlett began as the site of a school for Ute children in 1892.

== Geography ==
According to the United States Census Bureau, the CDP has a total area of 5.2 square miles (13.5 km^{2}), all land.

=== Climate ===
According to the Köppen Climate Classification system, Randlett has a semi-arid climate, abbreviated "BSk" on climate maps.

== Demographics ==
Historical population
Census	Pop.	Note	%±
1910	1,066		—
1920	765		−28.2%
1930	409		−46.5%
1940	389		−4.9%
1950	353		−9.3%
1990	283		—
2000	224		−20.8%
2010	220		−1.8%
2020	184		−16.4%
Source: U.S. Census Bureau

As of the census of 2000, there were 224 people, 63 households, and 57 families residing in the CDP. The population density was 43.0 people per square mile (16.6/km^{2}). There were 74 housing units at an average density of 14.2/sq mi (5.5/km^{2}). The racial makeup of the CDP was 4.02% White, 93.30% Native American, 1.34% from other races, and 1.34% from two or more races. Hispanic or Latino of any race were 8.48% of the population.

There were 63 households, out of which 33.3% had children under the age of 18 living with them, 39.7% were married couples living together, 38.1% had a female householder with no husband present, and 9.5% were non-families. 7.9% of all households were made up of individuals, and none had someone living alone who was 65 years of age or older. The average household size was 3.56 and the average family size was 3.67.

In the CDP, the population was spread out, with 35.3% under the age of 18, 12.5% from 18 to 24, 24.1% from 25 to 44, 21.4% from 45 to 64, and 6.7% who were 65 years of age or older. The median age was 26 years. For every 100 females, there were 82.1 males. For every 100 females age 18 and over, there were 81.3 males.

The median income for a household in the CDP was $16,591, and the median income for a family was $16,071. Males had a median income of $17,083 versus $13,750 for females. The per capita income for the CDP was $6,042. About 48.3% of families and 54.5% of the population were below the poverty line, including 64.9% of those under the age of eighteen and 64.7% of those 65 or over.

== See also ==
- List of census-designated places in Utah
- Ouray National Wildlife Refuge
