= Toquerville, Utah =

City in Utah, United States

- City
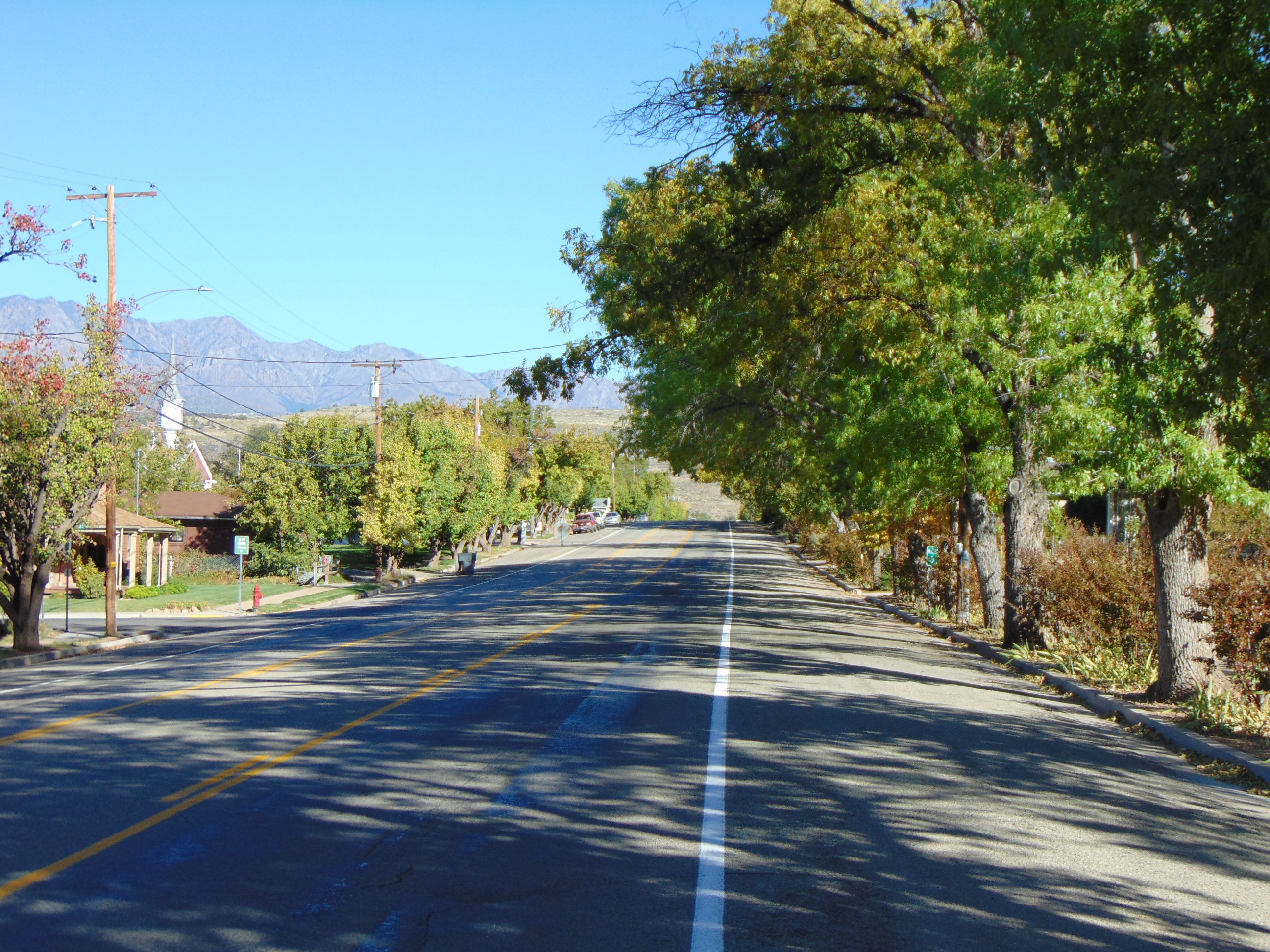
- North along Toquerville Boulevard (Utah State Route 17) in Toquerville, October 2016

- Location within Washington County and Utah
- Coordinates: 37°14′55″N 113°17′45″W
- Country: United States
- State: Utah
- County: Washington
- Settled: 1858
- Named for: Chief Toquer

Area
  - Total: 22.19 sq mi (57.48 km^{2})
  - Land: 22.19 sq mi (57.48 km^{2})
  - Water: 0 sq mi (0.00 km^{2})
- Elevation: 3,383 ft (1,031 m)

Population (2020)
  - Total: 1,870
  - Density: 88.7/sq mi (34.2/km^{2})
- Time zone: UTC-7 (Mountain (MST))
  - Summer (DST): UTC-6 (MDT)
- ZIP code: 84774
- Area code: 435
- FIPS code: 49-76900
- GNIS feature ID: 2413395
- Website: www.toquerville.utah.gov

Toquerville (/ˈtoʊkərvɪl/ TOH-kər-vil) is a city in east–central Washington County, Utah, United States. The population was 1,870 at the 2020 census.

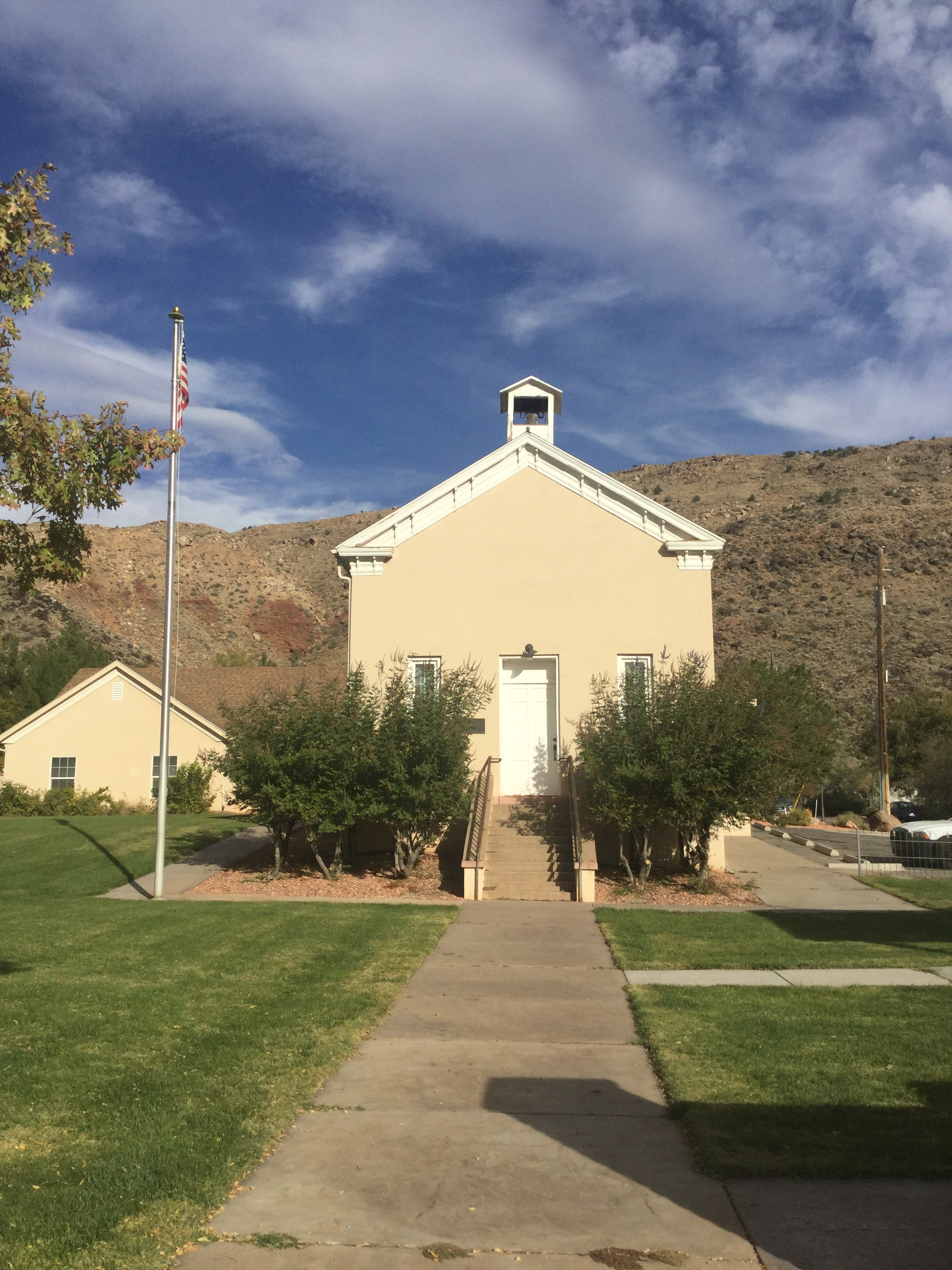
Toquerville Hall, October 2021

== History ==
Toquerville was named after an early Paiute chief. The population has grown from only 19 families in the late 1800s. Toquerville's proximity to Zion National Park has created a healthy tourism economy where the community traditionally had depended on agriculture.

From establishment to some time after 1882, Toquerville served as the county seat of Kane County, before the county's boundaries shifted eastward to their present location.

Although it was still a town at the 2000 census, Toquerville became a city at the end of 2000.

== Geography ==
According to the United States Census Bureau, the city has a total area of 14.2 square miles (37 km^{2}), all land. Ash Creek flows through the community. Utah State Route 17 passes through the community and connects with Interstate 15 2.5 miles north of the community.

== Demographics ==
Historical population
Census	Pop.	Note	%±
1860	79		—
1870	264		234.2%
1880	371		40.5%
1890	260		−29.9%
1900	144		−44.6%
1910	186		29.2%
1920	331		78.0%
1930	288		−13.0%
1940	263		−8.7%
1950	219		−16.7%
1960	197		−10.0%
1970	185		−6.1%
1980	277		49.7%
1990	488		76.2%
2000	910		86.5%
2010	1,370		50.5%
2020	1,870		36.5%
2023 (est.)	1,970		5.3%
U.S. Decennial Census

=== 2020 census ===
As of the 2020 census, Toquerville had a population of 1,870. The median age was 40.7 years. 26.1% of residents were under the age of 18 and 23.6% of residents were 65 years of age or older. For every 100 females there were 103.0 males, and for every 100 females age 18 and over there were 99.1 males age 18 and over.

7.7% of residents lived in urban areas, while 92.3% lived in rural areas.

There were 596 households in Toquerville, of which 36.4% had children under the age of 18 living in them. Of all households, 73.5% were married-couple households, 11.7% were households with a male householder and no spouse or partner present, and 12.2% were households with a female householder and no spouse or partner present. About 11.4% of all households were made up of individuals and 7.2% had someone living alone who was 65 years of age or older.

There were 648 housing units, of which 8.0% were vacant. The homeowner vacancy rate was 0.2% and the rental vacancy rate was 16.9%.

Racial composition as of the 2020 census
Race	Number	Percent
White	1,699	90.9%
Black or African American	2	0.1%
American Indian and Alaska Native	25	1.3%
Asian	17	0.9%
Native Hawaiian and Other Pacific Islander	1	0.1%
Some other race	41	2.2%
Two or more races	85	4.5%
Hispanic or Latino (of any race)	93	5.0%

=== 2000 census ===
As of the 2000 census, there were 910 people, 282 households, and 236 families residing in the town. The population density was 64.3 people per square mile (24.8/km^{2}). There were 325 housing units at an average density of 23.0 per square mile (8.9/km^{2}). On July 12, 2007, the City Council approved the development of 3000 households. The racial makeup of the town was 97.03% White, 0.11% African American, 0.88% Native American, 0.11% Asian, 0.11% Pacific Islander, 0.77% from other races, and 0.99% from two or more races. Hispanic or Latino of any race were 2.86% of the population.

There were 282 households, out of which 36.9% had children under the age of 18 living with them, 72.0% were married couples living together, 9.6% had a female householder with no husband present, and 16.3% were non-families. 14.2% of all households were made up of individuals, and 4.6% had someone living alone who was 65 years of age or older. The average household size was 3.23 and the average family size was 3.56.

In the town the population was spread out, with 32.9% under the age of 18, 9.3% from 18 to 24, 19.6% from 25 to 44, 24.6% from 45 to 64, and 13.6% who were 65 years of age or older. The median age was 34 years. For every 100 females, there were 101.8 males. For every 100 females age 18 and over, there were 97.1 males.

The median income for a household in the town was $34,038, and the median income for a family was $36,146. Males had a median income of $26,964 versus $20,938 for females. The per capita income for the town was $12,713. About 10.7% of families and 14.6% of the population were below the poverty line, including 17.1% of those under age 18 and 2.5% of those age 65 or over.

== See also ==
- List of municipalities in Utah
