= List of colleges and universities in Utah =

The following is a list of accredited colleges and universities in the U.S. state of Utah.

== Public institutions ==
All public institutions in the state of Utah are managed by the Utah System of Higher Education, which consists of eight public colleges and universities and eight technical colleges.

=== Four-year institutions ===
School	Location	Control	Carnegie Classification	Enrollment (fall 2024)	Founded	Branches and campuses
Southern Utah University	Cedar City	Public	Master's university	15,444	1897	
University of Utah	Salt Lake City	Public	R1: Very high Doctoral/Research university	36,894	1850	Asia (Incheon), Sandy, and St. George
Utah State University	Logan	Public	R1: Very high Doctoral/Research university	28,904	1888	Regional campus: USU Eastern (Price); Statewide campuses: Brigham City, Tooele, and Uintah Basin (Roosevelt and Vernal)
Utah Tech University	St. George	Public	Baccalaureate college	13,167	1911	Hurricane
Utah Valley University	Orem	Public	Master's university	46,807	1941	Lehi and Wasatch (Heber City)
Weber State University	Ogden	Public	Master's university	32,701	1889	Center for Continuing Education (Clearfield), Community Education Center (Ogden), Davis (Layton), Downtown (Ogden), Farmington Station, and Morgan Center

=== Two-year institutions ===
==== Associate's colleges ====
- Salt Lake Community College, various locations in Salt Lake County
- Snow College, Ephraim and Richfield

==== Technical colleges ====
- Bridgerland Technical College, Logan
- Davis Technical College, Kaysville
- Dixie Technical College, St. George
- Mountainland Technical College, Lehi
- Ogden–Weber Technical College, Ogden
- Southwest Technical College, Cedar City
- Tooele Technical College, Tooele
- Uintah Basin Technical College, Roosevelt

== Private institutions ==
=== Four-year institutions ===
School	Location	Control	Carnegie Classification	Enrollment (fall 2024)	Founded	Branches and campuses
Brigham Young University	Provo	Private (not for profit)	R1: very high research/doctoral production	35,873	1875	BYU-Hawaii, BYU-Idaho, Jerusalem, Salt Lake City
Eagle Gate College	Murray & Layton	Private (for profit)	Baccalaureate / Associates Colleges	636	1979	Layton, Salt Lake City
Ensign College	Salt Lake City	Private (not for profit)	Faith-related institution	7,594	1886	
Fortis College	Millcreek	Private (for profit)	Baccalaureate / Associates Colleges	383	2008	
Joyce University of Nursing and Health Sciences (formerly Ameritech College)	Draper	Private (not for profit)	Baccalaureate / Associates Colleges	2,073	1979	
Mount Liberty College	Murray	Private (not for profit)	unaccredited	20	2019	
Neumont College of Computer Science	Salt Lake City	Private (for profit)		476	2003	
Newlane University	Lehi	Private (not for profit)	Baccalaureate / Associates Colleges (Nationally Accredited)		2017	
Provo College	Provo	Private (for profit)	Baccalaureate / Associates Colleges	669	1984	
Rocky Mountain University of Health Professions	Provo	Private (for profit)	Doctoral university	1,686	1998	
Rocky Vista University	Ivins	Private (for profit)	Doctoral university	1039	2006	
Roseman University of Health Sciences	South Jordan	Private (not for profit)	Doctoral university		1999	
Salt Lake Baptist College / Salt Lake Bible College	Taylorsville	Private (not for profit)	Faith-related institution			
Western Governors University	Millcreek	Private (not for profit)	Masters university	210,208	1996	
Westminster University	Salt Lake City	Private (not for profit)	Masters university	1,155	1875	

== Defunct institutions ==
School	Location	Control	Founded	Closed
Broadview College	West Jordan	Private (for profit)	1977	2024
Church University	Salt Lake City	Private	1892	1894
George Wythe University	Draper	Private (Not for profit)	1992	2016
Independence University	Salt Lake City	Private (for profit)	1978	2021
ITT Technical Institute	Murray	Private (for profit)	1969	2016
Stevens-Henager College	Ogden	Private (for profit)	1891	2021

== See also ==
- Utah System of Higher Education
- Utah College of Applied Technology
- Higher education in the United States
- List of college athletic programs in Utah
- List of American institutions of higher education
- List of recognized higher education accreditation organizations
- List of colleges and universities
- List of colleges and universities by country
