= Utah System of Higher Education =

Education organization in Utah, United States

- Seal of the Utah Board of Higher Education
- Type: Public university system
- Established: March 21, 1969; 57 years ago
- Commissioner: Geoffrey Landward
- Students: 234,526 students (Fall 2023)
- Location: Salt Lake City, Utah, United States
- Campus: 16 campuses
- Website: ushe.edu

The Utah System of Higher Education (USHE) is the public university system of the state of Utah. It includes each of the state's sixteen public institutions of higher education, including its eight technical colleges.

== History ==
On March 21, 1969, the Utah State Legislature passed the Utah Higher Education Act of 1969, establishing the Utah System of Higher Education and its governing body, the State Board of Higher Education, to govern Utah's (at the time) nine institutions of higher learning, as well as administer the federal Higher Education Act of 1965.

In 1977, an amendment was passed to rename the board to the Utah State Board of Regents, as well as increase its membership to sixteen, with provisions for appointing of a student member. Subsequently, a 1981 amendment further increased this number to seventeen, with the seventeenth member being the lieutenant governor of Utah.

In 2020, the Utah System of Technical Colleges was subsumed into USHE, with the Utah State Board of Regents being renamed to the Utah Board of Higher Education.

Today, the board consists of 10 Utah citizens, all of whom are appointed by the governor of Utah, one of whom is a Student Board member. Each board member is appointed to six-year staggered terms, with the exception of student board members, who are appointed to one-year terms.

Some notable current and past board members include Patricia W. Jones, Nolan Karras, Aaron Skonnard, Steve Starks, and Cydni Tetro.

== Colleges and universities ==
Utah System of Higher Education locations.
Black: Colleges and universities; Red: Community colleges; Yellow: Technical colleges.

=== Public colleges and universities ===
Campus	Location	Founded	Enrollment	Endowment	Athletics	
Campus	Location	Founded	Enrollment	Endowment	Affiliation	Nickname
Southern Utah University	Cedar City	1897	15,444 (fall 2024)	$29.9 million (2019)	NCAA Div I WAC	Thunderbirds
University of Utah	Salt Lake City	1850	36,970 (fall 2024)	$1.64 billion (2023)	NCAA Div I Big 12	Utes
Utah State University	Logan	1888	28,900 (fall 2024)	$538.4 million (2023)	NCAA Div I Mountain West	Aggies
Utah Tech University	St. George	1911	13,167 (fall 2024)	$16.3 million (2019)	NCAA Div I WAC	Trailblazers
Utah Valley University	Orem	1941	46,809 (fall 2024)	$100 million (2023)	NCAA Div I WAC	Wolverines
Weber State University	Ogden	1889	32,701 (fall 2024)	$219.5 million (2022)	NCAA Div I Big Sky	Wildcats

=== Regional campuses ===
- Utah State University-Brigham City – Brigham City
- Utah State University Eastern – Price
- Utah State University–Tooele – Tooele
- Utah State University-Uintah Basin – Roosevelt & Vernal

=== Community colleges ===
- Salt Lake Community College — Salt Lake City
- Snow College — Ephraim

=== Technical colleges ===
- Bridgerland Technical College — Logan
- Davis Technical College — Kaysville
- Dixie Technical College — St. George
- Mountainland Technical College — Lehi
- Ogden–Weber Technical College — Ogden
- Southwest Technical College — Cedar City
- Tooele Technical College — Tooele
- Uintah Basin Technical College — Roosevelt
