= Laurens Smith =

American university provost

Laurens H. Smith

Utah State University Provost
- In office July 1, 2022 – June 30, 2026
- Preceded by: Frank Galey
- Succeeded by: Chris D. Corcoran

VP of Statewide Campuses

Personal details
- Born: Laurens H. Smith
- Education: Eastern Connecticut State University (B.S.); University of Kansas (M.S.); University of Maryland (Ph.D)
- Profession: University Administrator

Laurens H. "Larry" Smith was the Provost of Utah State University. He previously served as the VP of Statewide Campuses for Utah State. He has held many administrative roles at USU, including interim and permanent roles in Research, Graduate Programs, and other including holding the same position as Provost for 18 months from 2016 to 2018. He has previously been faculty, in a teaching and research role at the Idaho State University.

== Personal life and education ==
Larry Smith received his undergraduate degree in biology from Eastern Connecticut State University, where he has continued to stay involved as a donor and alumnus, recently being distinguished as an "Eastern Fellow." While at ECSU, he worked under professors Barry Wulff and Mike Gable. He received his master's degree in physiology from Kansas, before getting his doctorate in the same at Maryland.

== Career ==
After some post grad work at various med schools and universities, Smith began teaching and conducting research at Idaho State University. During his 14 years at ISU, he was the founding director of the ISU Molecular Research Core Facility.

In 2003, he took his initial role at USU as the associate graduate dean. He later described to student his decision to switch from research to administration “Your passion may change...I was in my 40s when mine changed and I realized I wanted to work in administration. Right now, you may not know your passion, and that’s okay.” He continued to work with graduate students as the interim dean for the School of Graduate Studies (2004-2006) and then took on a larger role at the university as the senior vice provost.

After then provost Noelle Cockett was appointed as the new Utah State University President, he took on the role of interim provost for eighteen months from 2016 to 2018, until his (now) predecessor Frank Galey could be hired. Notably, as interim provost he was put over the committee investigating the USU piano department amidst sexual abuse allegations. He was appointed interim VP for Research from 2018 to 2019, which lead to further appointment to a position on the board of trustees for USU's Space Dynamics Laboratory.

In 2019, he became Vice President of Statewide Campuses (first as interim, then officially appointed in August 2020.) That position placed him over the state of Utah's land-grant university system, a total of 31 statewide campuses, including two residential campuses USU Eastern and USU Blanding. Statewide also includes formerly named "Regional Campuses" with faculty, including Brigham City, Tooele, and Uintah. As VP statewide campuses, he oversaw the expansion of many campuses including a new campus for USU Moab.

He was announced as the choice to replace Frank Galey as provost of USU in spring of 2022, while Galey's other title, Executive Vice President would be separated and given to Robert W. Wagner in an expansion of university administration. He took office July 1 of the same year.

== Published works ==
- Wang, Z., Raifu, M., Howard, M., Smith, L., Hansen, D.R, Goldsby, R., Ratner, D., (2000). Universal PCR amplification of mouse immunoglobulin gene variable regions: the design of degenerate primers and an assessment of the effect of DNA polymerase 3' to 5' exonuclease activity. Journal of immunological methods, 233:1-2, 167–77.
- Smothers, J.F, von Dohlen, C.D, Smith, L., Spall, R.D, (1994). Molecular evidence that the myxozoan protists are metazoans. Science, 265, 1719-1721

== Recognitions ==
- Eastern Fellow '20 (Eastern Connecticut State University)
