= Marlon O. Snow =

American politician (1948–2025)

Marlon Snow

Member of the Utah House of Representatives
- In office 1998–2000

Personal details
- Born: Marlon Olsen Snow; March 9, 1948 Roosevelt, Utah, U.S.
- Died: August 22, 2025 (aged 77) Orem, Utah, U.S.
- Party: Republican
- Spouse: Ann Perkins (m. 1970)
- Relatives: Gordon E. Snow (brother)
- Education: Dixie College; Utah State University

Marlon Olsen Snow (March 9, 1948 – August 22, 2025) was an American politician. A member of the Republican Party, he served in the Utah House of Representatives from 1998 to 2000.

== Early life and career ==
Snow was born in Roosevelt, Utah, the son of Alva Crosby Snow and Jean Olsen. He was the brother of Gordon E. Snow, a Utah representative. He attended Union High School, graduating in 1966. After graduating, he worked as a missionary for The Church of Jesus Christ of Latter-day Saints from 1967 to 1969, which after his missionary service, he attended Dixie College and Utah State University.

Snow served in the Utah House of Representatives from 1998 to 2000.

== Personal life and death ==
In 1970, Snow married Ann Perkins. Their marriage lasted until Snow's death in 2025.

Snow died in Orem, Utah, on August 22, 2025, at the age of 77.
