= Ridge Career Center =

School in Winter Haven, Florida, US

Coordinates: 28.0766°N 81.6651°W

- Former name: Ridge Vocational-Technical Center
- Type: public vocational school
- Established: 1978
- Director: Lisa B. Harden
- Faculty: 84
- Students: 560
- Undergraduates: 560
- Location: Winter Haven, Florida, United States
- Campus: Suburban

Ridge Career Center is on the northeast edge of Winter Haven, Florida. Its street address is 7700 State Road 544, Winter Haven, Florida 33881. However, it is actually a short distance south of Road 544 and it can be reached via Brenton Manor Avenue, where all entrances to the school are located.

== History ==
This school got its start in 1974, when planning for it started. Construction began on the current site in 1977 and was finished in late 1978. The school opened in 1978 as the Ridge Vocational-Technical Center and the name later changed to the current name. Classes were held at various area locations while the campus was built. In January 1979 all school activities were moved to the completed campus.

== Statistics ==
According to information from the U.S. Department of Education Institute of Education Sciences, National Center for Education Statistics, Ridge Career Center has 560 students, all vocational or undergraduate. The same source says the school has a 20 to 1 student to teacher ratio. This source lists a graduation rate of 82%.

Faculty are listed as follows:

- Total 84
  - Instructional and research personnel 49
  - Executives and administrators 4
  - Other professional personnel 4
  - Nonprofessional personnel 27

== Career offerings ==
This school offers day, evening, short-term and online programs, according to its website. Specific offerings include:

- Approximately 35 career programs in various business, medical, construction and other fields.
- Apprenticeship program in automobile mechanics.
- Short-term programs to provide training in computer software and upon the request of certain industries.
- GED program.

== Student assistance ==
Several items are available to assist the students, according to the Polk County Public Schools website.

- The school has a library system.
- Various financial aid programs are available for students.
- A school advisory council operates at Ridge Career Center.

== Accreditation ==
Accreditation for Ridge comes from various sources. The Commission of the Council on Occupational Education lists this school as accredited. Another agency accrediting the school is the Southern Association of Colleges and Schools Council on Accreditation and School Improvement. The School Board of Polk County, Florida, on whose website Ridge is described, accredits this institution. Various individual programs are approved by agencies of the State of Florida and some programs are approved by various professional groups.
