= Galey (surname) =

Galey is a surname of French origin. Notable people with the surname include:

- Amy Galey, American politician from North Carolina
- Frank Galey, American academic
- Geneviève Galey (born 1944), French journalist
- Iris Galey (born 1936), Swiss trauma therapist and author
- Jean-Claude Galey (born 1946), French anthropologist and ethnologist
- Jean-Marie Galey (born 1947), French actor
- Louis-Émile Galey (1904–1997), French filmmaker
- Marcel Galey (1905–1991), French footballer
- Marie Galey (born 1975), French singer and dubbing artist
- Matthieu Galey (1934–1986), French author and critic
- Thomas Galey (1949–2010), German artist and teacher

== See also ==
- Galey (disambiguation)
