= Duchesne High School =

Duchesne High School may refer to:

- Duchesne Academy of the Sacred Heart (Nebraska)
- Duchesne High School (Missouri)
- Duchesne High School (Utah)
