= UCAT =

UCAT may refer to:

- Ulster County Area Transit, a transit operator in New York
- Utah College of Applied Technology, a college in Utah
- University of Chester Academies Trust, England
- University Clinical Aptitude Test, an admissions test used in the United Kingdom, Australia and New Zealand
