= Galey (disambiguation) =

Galey is a commune in Occitanie, France. It may also refer to:

== Media ==
- Galey Tzahal, Israeli radio station operated by the IDF

== People ==
- Galey (surname), a list of people with the surname

== Places ==
- Galey-Buzat, a village in Bashkortostan, Russia

== Sport ==
- Galey Bay Regatta, an annual yachting regatta held from 1872 until 1913
