= Duchesne County School District =

School district in Utah, United States

Duchesne County School District (DCSD) is a school district headquartered in Roosevelt, Utah. It serves all of Duchesne County, and had about 5,300 students in the 2025-26 school year.

By 1995 the district began using a fiber optic tele-learning system to teach foreign languages in addition to standard in-person classes, and each high school had courses in at least one foreign language.

== Schools ==
K-12 schools

- Tabiona School

7-12 schools

- Altamont High School
- Duchesne High School

High schools (9-12)

- Union High School

Junior high schools (6-8)

- Roosevelt Junior High School
  - In 1995 teachers began incorporating foreign language lessons into non-foreign language core classes.

Elementary schools

- Altamont Elementary School (K-6)
- Centennial Elementary School (K-5)
- Duchesne Elementary School (K-6)
- East Elementary School (K-5)
- Kings Peak Elementary School (K-5)
- Myton Elementary School (K-5)
- Neola Elementary School (K-5)

Special education

- Con Amore School (K-12) - It is a school for special education, established in 1975.

Adult education

- District Learning Center

== See also ==
- List of school districts in Utah
