= Ogden Military Academy =

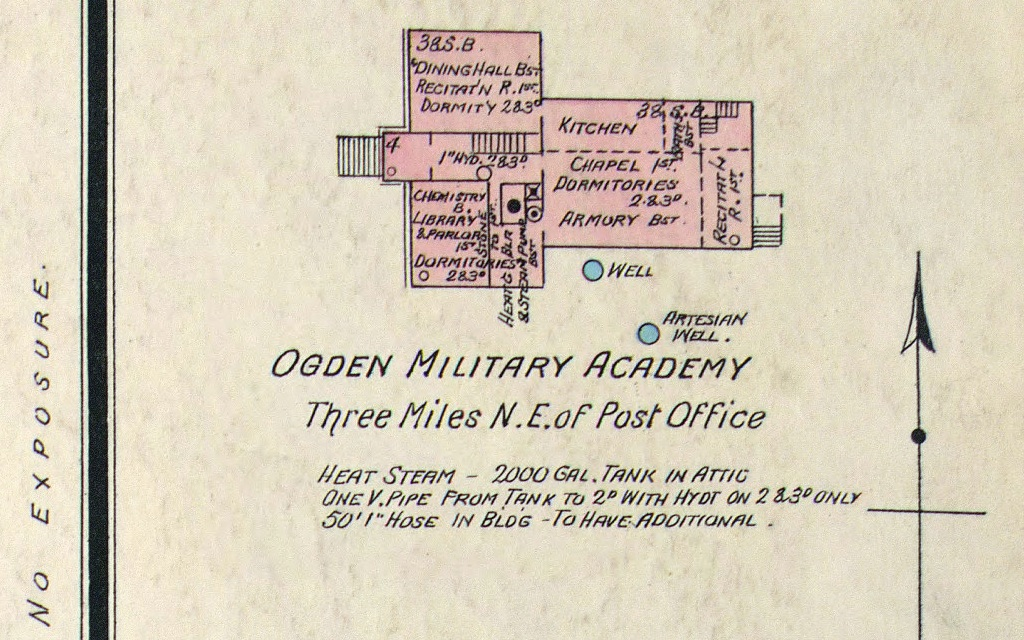
- 1890 fire insurance map of the academy
- 200 North Washington Boulevard; Ogden, Utah; United States

Information
- Type: Private military boarding school
- Opened: October 1, 1889 — 1896

The Ogden Military Academy was a private boarding school and military academy that operated in Ogden, Utah from 1889 to 1896.

== History ==
The academy was opened on October 1, 1889, with 70 resident students and 50 cadets. The annual fee of $750 covered tuition, room and board. Some of the academic courses at the school were instructed by United States Army officers.

In 1896, the Utah State Industrial School (later renamed Youth Development Center) took over the site until 1984, when the Ogden–Weber Technical College (formerly known last the Ogden–Weber Applied Technology College) moved its campus to this location. The collected records of the academy from September 1890 to 1893 were transferred from the archives of Brigham Young University to the Stewart Library at Weber State University.

== Notable cadets ==
- Frederick C. Loofbourow - U.S. Representative from Utah

== See also ==
- List of defunct United States military academies
