= Nancy A. Leatherwood =

American club woman

Nancy Rebecca Albaugh Leatherwood (November 19, 1872 – September 1961) was an American clubwoman who was director for Utah of the General Federation of Women's Clubs and wife of U.S. Representative from Utah, Elmer O. Leatherwood.

== Early life and education ==
Nancy Rebecca Albaugh was born on November 19, 1872, in Warrensburg, Missouri, the daughter of Henry Albaugh (1845-1911) and Mary Longenecker (1842-1923). She had 5 siblings: Stanley L. Albaugh (1873-1957), Myra Irene Willock (1876-1975), Clarence Jacob Albaugh (1878-1968), Mary Edna Albaugh (1880-1920), Ralph Emerson Albaugh (1882-1984).

Albaugh graduated from Kingman High School and then attended Kansas State Normal School, class 1894; she then obtained a Ph.B. from University of Wisconsin-Madison, her honor thesis being Populist Legislation in Kansas (1901).

== Career ==
Nancy A. Leatherwood was interested in historical, literary and civic activities, and history, art, philosophy, economics.

She was National chairman of Historical and Literary Reciprocity Committee of the Daughters of the American Revolution, vice-president for Utah of the League of American Pen women, president of Utah Federation of Women's Clubs and Director for Utah of the General Federation of Women's Clubs, president of the College Club.

She taught at Sunday-school and helped to secure a loan fund to assist girls through college. She was in favor of woman suffrage.

In 1949 she compiled the Albaugh, Leatherwood, Longnecker and allied families.

She was member of: Ladies' Library Club of Salt Lake City, American Association of University Women, Congressional Club, Wasaleti Club.

== Personal life ==
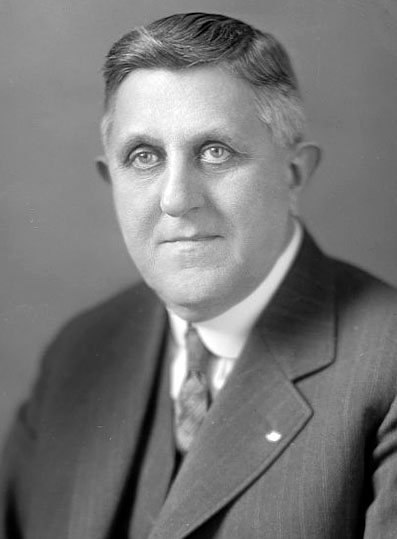
Elmer O. Leatherwood

In 1894 in Kingman, Kansas, Nancy Albaugh married Elmer O. Leatherwood (1872-1929), U.S. Representative from Utah, and they had one daughter, Margaret Jane Bourgerie (1912-2003). Elmer Leatherwood was a lawyer with the firm Staup, Nibley, and Leatherwood. He was district attorney for the Third Judicial District Court from 1908 to 1916 and served as a Republican Congressman from 1921–26. He was also prominent in the business community as president of the Olympus Mining and Milling Company, the Learly and Warren Stockyards, and the Western Company.

After living in Wisconsin and Kansas, Nancy A. Leatherwood moved to Utah in 1902 and lived at 1237 East 1st St. South, Salt Lake City, Utah. The house was built for them in 1911 and is currently included in the University Neighborhood Historic District (Salt Lake City, Utah), a National Register of Historic Places listings in Salt Lake County, Utah.

She liked china painting, long tramps through the mountains, cards, dancing, theatre.

Leatherwood died in September 1961 and is buried at Mount Olivet Cemetery (Salt Lake City).
