= Elmer O. Leatherwood =

American politician

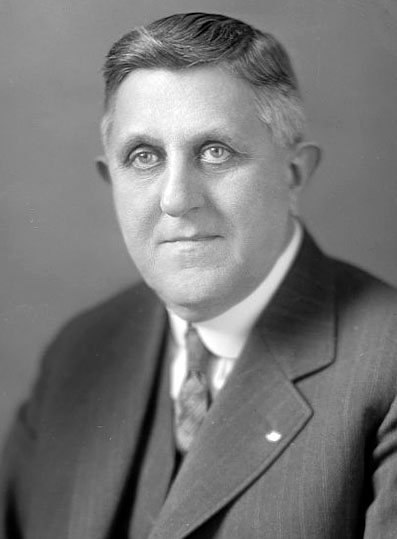

Member of the U.S. House of Representatives from Utah's 2nd district
- In office March 4, 1921 – December 24, 1929
- Preceded by: James Henry Mays
- Succeeded by: Frederick C. Loofbourow

Personal details
- Born: September 4, 1872 Waverly, Ohio, US
- Died: December 24, 1929 (aged 57) Washington, D.C., US
- Resting place: Mount Olivet Cemetery, Salt Lake City
- Party: Republican
- Spouse: Nancy Rebecca Albaugh
- Children: 1
- Education: Kansas State Normal School; University of Wisconsin

Elmer O. Leatherwood (September 4, 1872 – December 24, 1929) was an American politician and attorney who served five terms as a U.S. representative from Utah from 1921 until his death in 1929.

== Biography ==
Born on a farm near Waverly, Ohio, Leatherwood attended the public schools. He moved to Emporia, Kansas, in 1888. He was graduated from the Kansas State Normal School at Emporia, Kansas, in 1894. He engaged in public school work from 1894 to 1898.

He studied law and was admitted to the bar at Hiawatha, Kansas, in 1898. He graduated from the law department of the University of Wisconsin–Madison in 1901 and was admitted to practice.

=== Early career ===
He moved to Salt Lake City, Utah, the same year and continued the practice of his profession.

Leatherwood served as district attorney for the third judicial district of Utah from 1908 to 1916. He served as delegate to the Republican National Convention in 1924. He served as president of the Western Powder Co., Leary & Warren Stockyards, Hellgate Mining & Milling Co., and the Olympus Mining & Milling Co.

=== Congress ===
Leatherwood was elected as a Republican to the Sixty-seventh and to the four succeeding Congresses and served from March 4, 1921, until his death.

He served as chairman of the Committee on Expenditures on Public Buildings (Sixty-eighth and Sixty-ninth Congresses).

=== Death and burial ===
He died in Washington, D.C., on December 24, 1929 and was interred in Mount Olivet Cemetery, Salt Lake City, Utah.

== Electoral history ==
1920 United States House of Representatives elections
Party	Candidate	Votes	%
Republican	Elmer O. Leatherwood	39,239	54.82
Democratic	Mathonihah Thomas	28,201	39.40
Farmer–Labor	Marvin P. Bales	2,437	3.40
Socialist	C.T. Stoney	1,696	2.38
Total votes		71,573	100.0
Republican gain from Democratic			

1922 United States House of Representatives elections
Party	Candidate	Votes	%
Republican	Elmer O. Leatherwood (Incumbent)	28,591	50.43
Democratic	David C. Dunbar	26,145	46.12
Farmer–Labor	E. G. Locke	1,959	3.45
Total votes		56,695	100.0
Republican hold			

1924 United States House of Representatives elections
Party	Candidate	Votes	%
Republican	Elmer O. Leatherwood (Incumbent)	41,888	56.66
Democratic	James H. Waters	32,045	43.34
Total votes		73,933	100.0
Republican hold			

1926 United States House of Representatives elections
Party	Candidate	Votes	%
Republican	Elmer O. Leatherwood (Incumbent)	42,073	60.18
Democratic	William R. Wallace Jr.	27,006	38.63
Socialist	Otto E. Parsons	835	1.19
Total votes		69,914	100.0
Republican hold			

1928 United States House of Representatives elections
Party	Candidate	Votes	%
Republican	Elmer O. Leatherwood (Incumbent)	46,866	50.22
Democratic	Joshua H. Paul	46,025	49.31
Socialist	T. F. Eynon	439	0.47
Total votes		93,330	100.0
Republican hold			

== See also ==
- List of members of the United States Congress who died in office (1900–1949)

== Sources ==
- United States Congress. "Elmer O. Leatherwood (id: L000181)". Biographical Directory of the United States Congress.

U.S. House of Representatives
Preceded by James H. Mays	Member of the U.S. House of Representatives from Utah's 2nd congressional district March 4, 1921 - December 24, 1929	Succeeded by Frederick C. Loofbourow
