= Davis Technical College =

Public college in Kaysville, Utah, US

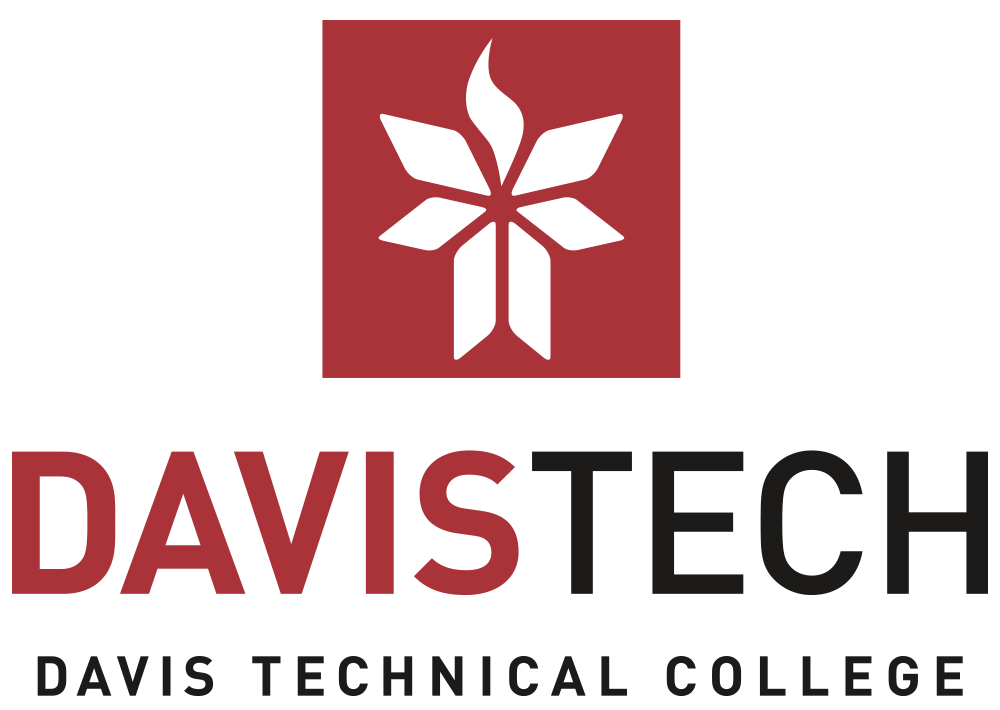
- Type: Public technical college
- Established: 1978
- Parent institution: Utah System of Higher Education
- Accreditation: Council on Occupational Education
- Affiliations: Utah College of Applied Technology
- President: Darin Brush
- Location: Kaysville, Utah, United States; 41°1′44″N 111°55′30″W
- Campus: Urban
- Colors: Red and Black
- Website: www.davistech.edu

Davis Technical College (Davis Tech) is a public technical college in Kaysville, Utah. It provides competency-based education in an open-entry, open-exit environment which prepares over 6,000 high school and adult students with career and technical skills. Generally, students may start or end at any time during the year and progress at their own pace.

Training is provided at the Kaysville, Utah campus, in local high schools, and at Davis Tech Freeport in Clearfield, Utah. The college is accredited by the Commission of the Council on Occupational Education.

== History ==
DTC Campus Life

Davis Technical College had its genesis in the early 1970s. To meet the demands of training immigrants in English and vocational skills, Davis School District started the Davis Vocational Center. It was located in a former elementary school in Layton, Utah.

The Davis Vocational Center began by offering classes in English as a Second Language (ESL), Basic English, Basic Math, and business classes. The classes were open to both adults and high school students. Agencies such as departments of rehabilitation and other division in the Department of Labor requested additional training.

The Utah State Board of Education realized the need for a larger vocational training facility in the future and purchased 68 acres (280,000 m^{2}) east of Davis High School in Kaysville, Utah. On this site, two buildings were constructed to house expanding technical programs. ESL and business classes remained at the Layton site.

In 1978, Davis School District officials were successful in their request to make the Center a state vocational school under the jurisdiction of the Utah State Board of Education. The Davis Area Vocational Center was established to serve Davis and Morgan counties.

For the first five years, the Center operated out of the two original existing buildings and temporary classrooms as well as leased, rented and borrowed space. Beginning in 1983, the State constructed an additional 155,000 sq ft (14,400 m^{2}). of space in three phases which were completed in 1987.

In 1991, the Davis Area Vocational Center’s name changed to Davis Applied Technology Center. This change signaled the importance of technological applications in the workplace and technology training through applied principles.

In 1998, the Center expanded its current facility by 34,000 sq ft (3,200 m^{2}) to accommodate new health programs and open additional space for existing programs.

In June 2001, a special session of the Legislature passed House Bill 1003, creating the Utah College of Applied Technology (UCAT), the state's 10th newest institution of higher education. The new legislation changed the institution’s name from Davis Applied Technology Center to Davis Applied Technology College.

With a $2.2 million gift from the Roy and Elizabeth Simmons Family Foundation and other donations, Davis Tech opened an entrepreneurship center on the school’s main campus in 2006. The 16,000 sq ft (1,500 m^{2}). facility houses the Davis Business Alliance, a small business development office, the Davis Chamber of Commerce, Service Corp of Retired Executives (SCORE), Utah Bid Development Solutions (UBiDS), and Grow Utah Ventures.

In 2009, Davis Tech added a 64,000 sq ft (5,900 m^{2}). building to its campus. Named after the founder of technical education, the Haven J. and Bonnie Rae Barlow Technology Building houses the manufacturing, information technology, and transportation programs.
