= Frederick C. Loofbourow =

American politician

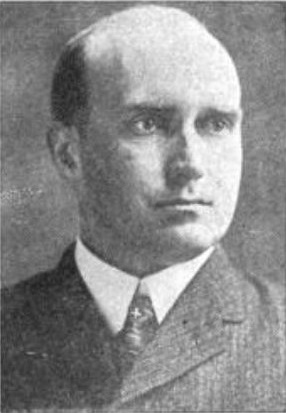
- Utah Independent (Salt Lake City, UT), April 13, 1911

Member of the U.S. House of Representatives from Utah's 2nd district
- In office November 4, 1930 – March 3, 1933
- Preceded by: Elmer O. Leatherwood
- Succeeded by: J. W. Robinson

Personal details
- Born: Frederick Charles Loofbourow; February 8, 1874 Atlantic, Iowa
- Died: July 8, 1949 (aged 75) Salt Lake City Utah
- Party: Republican
- Education: University of California at Berkeley
- Profession: Lawyer

Frederick Charles Loofbourow (February 8, 1874 – July 8, 1949) was an American lawyer and politician who served as a U.S. representative from Utah from 1930 to 1933.

== Biography ==
Born in Atlantic, Iowa, Loofbourow was educated in the common schools of Iowa. He moved with his parents to Utah in 1889. He graduated from the Ogden Military Academy, Ogden, Utah, in 1892, and from the law department of the University of California at Berkeley in 1896.

=== Early career ===
He was admitted to the bar the same year and commenced practice in Salt Lake City, Utah. He served as district attorney of the third judicial district of Utah from 1905 to 1911, and district judge from 1911 to 1916. He resumed the practice of law.

=== Congress ===
Loofbourow was elected as a Republican to the 71st United States Congress to fill the vacancy caused by the death of Elmer O. Leatherwood and on the same day was elected to the Seventy-second Congress and served from November 4, 1930, to March 3, 1933. He was an unsuccessful candidate for reelection in 1932 to the 73rd United States Congress and for election in 1934 to the 74th United States Congress.

=== Later career and death ===
He resumed the practice of law in Salt Lake City, until his retirement.

He died in Salt Lake City, July 8, 1949. His remains were cremated and the ashes scattered.

== Electoral history ==
1930 Utah's 2nd congressional district special election
Party	Candidate	Votes	%
Republican	Frederick C. Loofbourow	35,349	44.13
Democratic	Joshua H. Paul	33,915	42.34
Liberty	George N. Lawrence	10,591	13.22
Socialist	Otto E. Parsons	253	0.32
Total votes		80,108	100.0
Republican hold			

1930 United States House of Representatives elections
Party	Candidate	Votes	%
Republican	Frederick C. Loofbourow	35,106	44.29
Democratic	Joshua H. Paul	33,618	42.41
Liberty	George N. Lawrence	10,303	13.00
Socialist	Otto E. Parsons	239	0.30
Total votes		79,266	100.0
Republican hold			

1932 United States House of Representatives elections
Party	Candidate	Votes	%
Democratic	J. W. Robinson	62,400	57.08
Republican	Frederick C. Loofbourow (Incumbent)	46,919	42.92
Total votes		109,319	100.0
Democratic gain from Republican			

1934 United States House of Representatives elections
Party	Candidate	Votes	%
Democratic	J. W. Robinson (Incumbent)	58,175	62.30
Republican	Frederick C. Loofbourow	34,007	36.42
Communist	Carl Bjork	788	0.84
Socialist	A. L. Porter	405	0.43
Total votes		93,375	100.0
Democratic hold			

U.S. House of Representatives
Preceded by Elmer O. Leatherwood	Member of the U.S. House of Representatives from Utah's 2nd congressional district November 4, 1930 - March 3, 1933	Succeeded by J. W. Robinson
