= William A. Dawson =

American politician

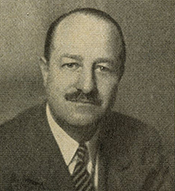

Member of the U.S. House of Representatives from Utah's 2nd district
- In office January 3, 1947 – January 3, 1949
- Preceded by: J. W. Robinson
- Succeeded by: Reva B. Bosone
- In office January 3, 1953 – January 3, 1959
- Preceded by: Reva B. Bosone
- Succeeded by: David S. King

Member of the Utah Senate
- In office 1940–1944

Personal details
- Born: November 5, 1903 Layton, Utah
- Died: November 7, 1981 (aged 78) Salt Lake City, Utah
- Resting place: Kaysville Cemetery, Kaysville, Utah
- Party: Republican
- Education: University of Utah
- Profession: Lawyer

William Adams Dawson (November 5, 1903 – November 7, 1981) was a U.S. representative from Utah.

== Biography ==
Born in Layton, Utah, Dawson attended the public schools. He graduated from the law department of the University of Utah in 1926. He was admitted to the bar the same year and commenced practice in Salt Lake City, and was County attorney of Davis County from 1926 to 1934, and mayor of Layton 1935–1939. He served as member of the Utah State Senate from 1940 to 1944.

=== Congress ===
Dawson was elected as a Republican to the Eightieth Congress (January 3, 1947 – January 3, 1949), defeating a seven-term Democrat. He was an unsuccessful candidate for reelection in 1948 to the Eighty-first Congress. In 1950 he sought nomination for the United States Senate, but placed fourth in the nominating convention.

Dawson was elected to the Eighty-third, replacing the woman who had unseated him in 1948, and reelected to the Eighty-fourth and Eighty-fifth Congresses (January 3, 1953 – January 3, 1959). Dawson voted in favor of the Civil Rights Act of 1957. He was an unsuccessful candidate for reelection in 1958 to the Eighty-sixth Congress.

Legislatively, Dawson served on the Interior and Insular Affairs Committee and sponsored three laws in that field. One failure was a proposal to build a storage project on the upper Colorado River. House Speaker Joseph W. Martin, Jr. pulled the bill in 1954 as too controversial, but the Glen Canyon project was approved by the following Democratic congress.

=== Later career and death ===
He served as vice president of Zions First National Bank from 1959 to 1969. He was a resident of Salt Lake City, Utah, until his death on November 7, 1981. He was interred in Kaysville Cemetery, Kaysville, Utah.

== Electoral results ==
1946 United States House of Representatives elections
Party	Candidate	Votes	%
Republican	William A. Dawson	56,402	52.71
Democratic	J. W. Robinson (Incumbent)	50,598	47.29
Total votes		107,000	100.0
Republican gain from Democratic			

1948 United States House of Representatives elections
Party	Candidate	Votes	%
Democratic	Reva Beck Bosone	92,770	57.46
Republican	William A. Dawson (Incumbent)	68,693	42.54
Total votes		161,463	100.0
Democratic gain from Republican			

1952 United States House of Representatives elections
Party	Candidate	Votes	%
Republican	William A. Dawson	105,296	52.55
Democratic	Reva Beck Bosone (Incumbent)	95,084	47.45
Total votes		200,380	100.0
Republican gain from Democratic			

1954 United States House of Representatives elections
Party	Candidate	Votes	%
Republican	William A. Dawson (Incumbent)	90,864	57.16
Democratic	Reva Beck Bosone	68,090	42.84
Total votes		158,954	100.0
Republican hold			

1956 United States House of Representatives elections
Party	Candidate	Votes	%
Republican	William A. Dawson (Incumbent)	119,683	57.64
Democratic	Oscar W. McConkie Jr.	87,970	42.36
Total votes		207,653	100.0
Republican hold			

1958 United States House of Representatives elections
Party	Candidate	Votes	%
Democratic	David S. King	91,213	51.11
Republican	William A. Dawson (Incumbent)	87,234	48.89
Total votes		178,447	100.0
Democratic gain from Republican			

U.S. House of Representatives
Preceded by J. W. Robinson	Member of the U.S. House of Representatives from Utah's 2nd congressional district 1947–1949	Succeeded by Reva B. Bosone
Preceded by Reva B. Bosone	Member of the U.S. House of Representatives from Utah's 2nd congressional district 1953–1959	Succeeded by David S. King
