= Intermountain Indian School =

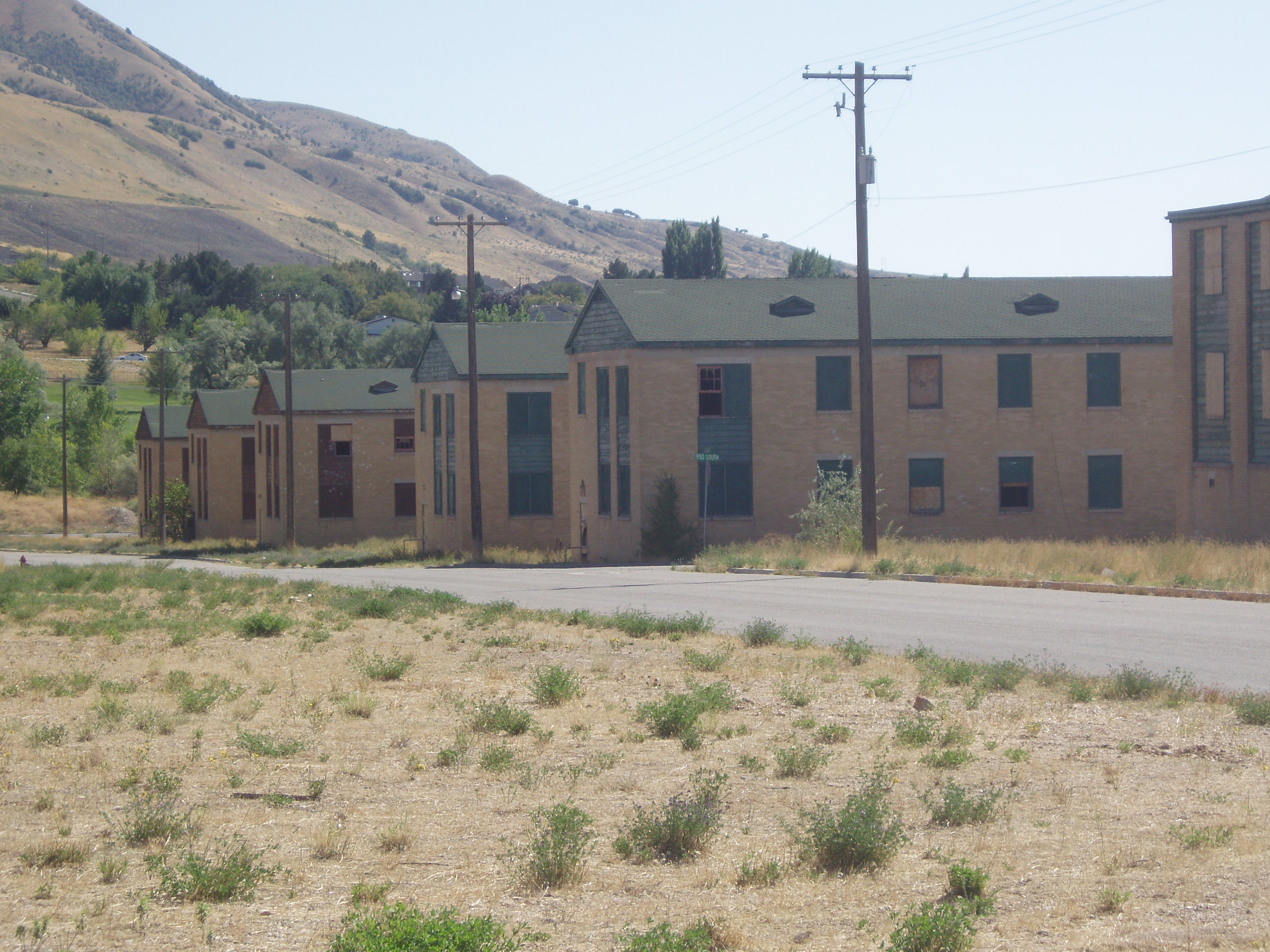
- A few vacant buildings at the Intermountain Indian School, 2008

Location
- Brigham City, Box Elder County, Utah 84302; United States
- 41.491047°N 112.0102233°W

Information
- School type: Native American boarding school
- Established: 1949
- Closed: 1984
- Grades: Elementary through high school
- Enrollment: 2,150

The Intermountain Indian School (1950–1984) was a Native American boarding school in Brigham City, Utah.

== History ==
This was originally the site of Bushnell Army Hospital. It operated from 1942 to 1946 and served wounded soldiers of World War II. Brigham City had donated the land to the Federal government in order to get a hospital constructed. Doctors, nurses, military personnel, wounded patients, and their families arrived in Brigham City to work at Bushnell. The first patient was admitted on 10 October 1942. After the hospital's closure following the end of the war, the buildings sat empty for a short period. The city considered what should be done with the land. The last patient was discharged 22 June 1946. At its peak, the hospital was a community of some 6,000 inhabitants, including patients, assigned military personnel, and civilian employees.

In 1948, Brigham City got a proposal for an Indian school. The estimate for remodeling, new construction, and equipment was $3.75 million. President Harry Truman signed the bill allocating the money in May 1949. The superintendent and a few assistants began working on June 4, 1949, and by January 1950, 542 students were accepted at the federally run Intermountain Indian School. Since that time, the school was authorized to enroll 2,150 students. The school served Navajo children, grades 1–12, and was designed to assimilate them. They were bused from Arizona. The school had its own medical facility and printing press.

In 1954, 24 students graduated from the school, and by 1955 that number jumped to 188. By 1981, 5,319 students had graduated.

By the early 1970s, enrollment was down. Native American activism had risen and many families wanted their children to be educated closer to home and to have more control over their education. The school enlarged its scope beyond the Navajo and was renamed as the Intermountain Inter-Tribal School for the 1974–1975 school year. It ultimately enrolled students from nearly 100 tribes.

In 1971, a group of students filed a lawsuit to shut the school down. They alleged administrators drugged students with Thorazine to sedate them, illegally segregated students, and provided an inferior education. The lawsuit was ultimately dismissed.

A year later, a student died by suicide in a Brigham City jail after being arrested for public intoxication.

The school eventually had students from many tribes and encouraged cultural activities. "When BIA officials planned on shutting down the school due to limited funding and declining enrollment, students rallied to keep it open. They organized a 24-mile run from Brigham City to the Federal Building in Ogden to speak with Utah’s federal delegates, including Republican Sen. Orrin Hatch and Republican Rep. James Hansen. None of them showed up." https://www.kuer.org/race-religion-social-justice/2021-08-06/some-lost-their-lives-some-found-their-lives-remembering-the-intermountain-indian-school

The school finally closed in 1984. City officials submitted a master plan for the site to the government in order to regain its 17 acres (69,000 m^{2}) along U.S. Route 91. It agreed to maintain the land as open space and not use it for anything other than recreation. The government deeded it back to the city.

Notable faculty at this school included Allan Houser. Notable alumni of the school included Robert Chee and Robert Draper.

== The school today ==
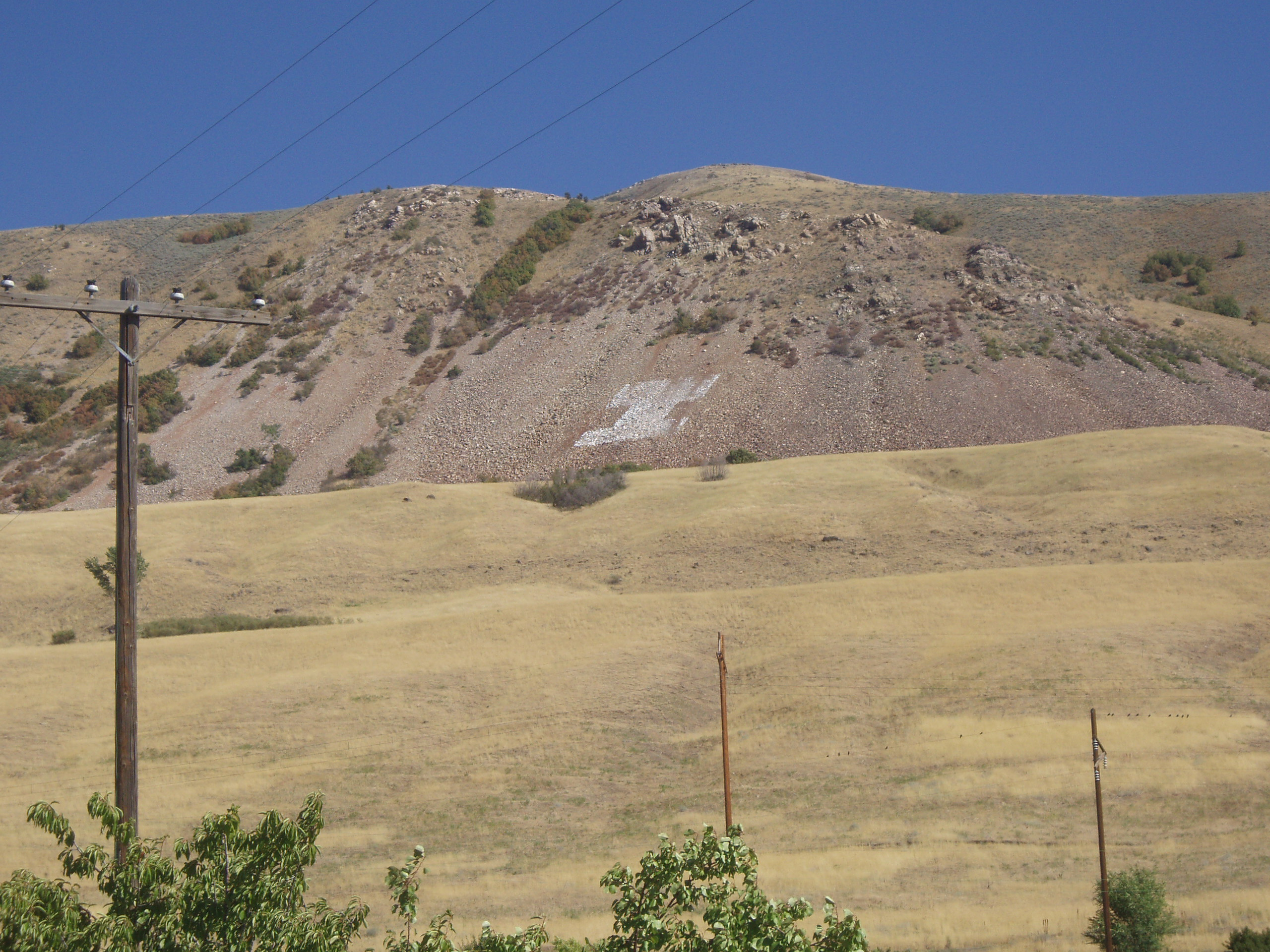
The letter I representing the school is still visible on the mountainside.

Brigham City turned the open land into a golf course and sold the rest to fund the golf course. Objects from the buildings were sold for $100,000, and property was sold for $2.5 million. The dormitories have been turned into townhouses called "Eagle Village". A furniture store, a consulting firm, a martial arts company, and various churches all house their businesses in the former home of the Intermountain Indian School. For several decades many of the buildings stood vacant, but in early 2013 these buildings were demolished to make way for an extension of the Brigham City campus of Utah State University.

For the past 20 years, former students of Intermountain have held an annual reunion the third week of July at Wheatfields Lake near Navajo, New Mexico.

== See also ==
- USU-Brigham City
