= Robert Chee =

Diné/Navajo artist, painter, printmaker (c.1937–1971)

- Hashke-Yil-Cale
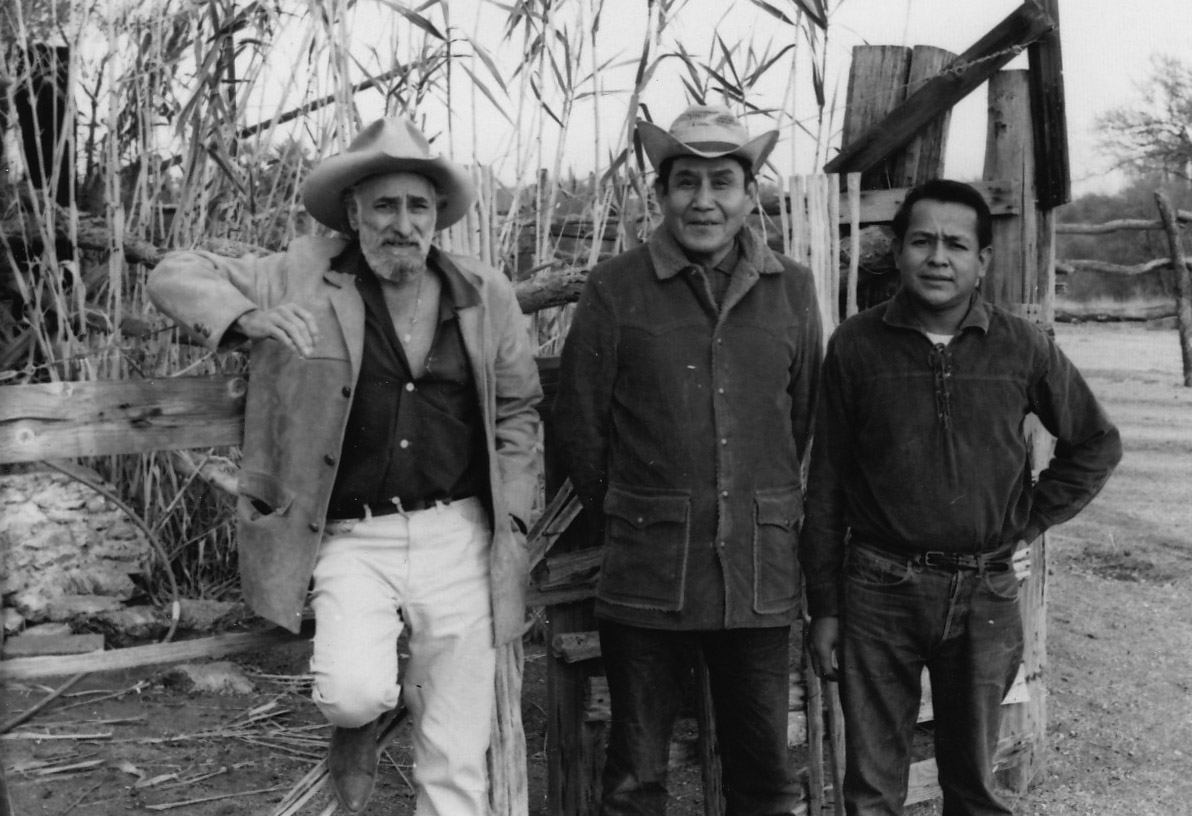
- Ettore DeGrazia, Harrison Begay, and Robert Chee (circa 1960) in Tucson, Arizona
- Born: December 14, 1937; St. Michaels, Arizona, U.S.
- Died: 1971; St. Michaels, Arizona, U.S.
- Other name: Hashke-Yil-E-Cale
- Spouse: Louise
- Children: 2

Robert Chee, also known as Hashke-Yil-Cale (1937–1971) was a Navajo contemporary artist and author. He is best known for his painting and serigraphy, but he also worked as an illustrator, and weaver.

== Early life and education ==
Robert Chee was born on December 14, 1937, in St. Michaels, Arizona. In early age, he attended school in Bellemont. His artistic talent was recognized in childhood, he started painting at age 10. Chee was enrolled in the Intermountain Indian School, where he studied under Allan Houser. He had been a member of Tewa Enterprises (around 1951), the Native American printmaking group.

== Career ==
From 1958 to 1961, Chee served in the United States Army and painted murals at army bases including one in Mainz, Germany. In 1959 and 1960, Chee won first prize at the Navajo Tribal Fair, and the Gallup Ceremonials in 1966. In 1963, Chee won first prize at the Philbrook Art Center (now known as the Philbrook Museum of Art).

Chee's favorite medium to work in was watercolor, and he often used darker-colored paper (typically black or blue papers) as a background. He was known for his distinct flatstyle painting, which was in part a reflection of the earlier "studio-style" of painting taught at Dorothy Dunn's art classes in the Santa Fe Indian School's Studio School. His later work shows the suggestion of a foreground with hills or the sprigs of plants coming from the earth. In 1969, Chee started using lighter colored paper (grey or white papers), which changed the feeling of many of his works.

== Death and legacy ==
Chee died in late 1971. His work can be found in public museum collections including the Minneapolis Institute of Art, Museum of Northern Arizona, Fred Jones Jr. Museum of Art, Arizona State Museum, Herbert F. Johnson Museum of Art, the Penticton Gallery, and the National Museum of the American Indian.

== See also ==
- List of Native American artists
