= Utah System of Technical Colleges =

The Utah System of Technical Colleges (formerly the Utah College of Applied Technology) was a system of public technical colleges in Utah. It was governed by a board of trustees appointed by the Governor and confirmed by the Utah State Senate. In 2020, it was subsumed into the Utah System of Higher Education.

== History ==
The Utah College of Applied Technology (UCAT) was a system of eight regional applied technology college (ATC) campuses in the state of Utah. UCAT was a public post-secondary institution and is governed by an 18-member Utah College of Applied Technology Board of Trustees. The UCAT president was the chief executive officer of the board of trustees and carried out the day-to-day business of the college. Each regional applied technology college campus had a board of directors composed of business and education leaders from the region who provide advice about the current needs of employers for technically skilled workers. Each regional applied technology college campus was led by a campus president who served as chief administrative officer.

During the 2012–13 academic year UCAT served over 35,000 part-time and full-time students. About 25% of UCAT's students are high school-age students who spend part of their day learning technical skills at regional applied technology college campus. About 75% of UCAT's students are adults who are seeking new skills to obtain employment or are upgrading their current employability skills. UCAT students who complete their training programs are awarded certificates that indicate the mastery of specific employability competencies in their area of study.

Another feature of UCAT was its Custom Fit program which served approximately 14,000 students during the 2012–13 academic year. Custom Fit works with Utah companies to address their identified need for increasing the skills of incumbent employees. Utah companies utilizing the Custom Fit program provide a 50% or more company cash contribution to the cost of the program.

Each regional campus of the Utah College of Applied Technology is accredited by the Council on Occupational Education. This national accrediting body specializes in accrediting career and technical education institutions that focus on a technically trained workforce.

In 2017, the Utah state legislature replaced the Utah College of Applied Technology with the Utah System of Technical Colleges. Each of the former regional applied technology colleges were renamed as "technical colleges."

In 2020, the Utah System of Technical Colleges was subsumed into the Utah System of Higher Education.

== Former member colleges ==
Utah System of Technical Colleges member institutions
- Bridgerland Technical College, Logan
  - President, Chad Campbell
- Davis Technical College, Kaysville
  - President, Darin Brush
- Dixie Technical College, St. George
  - President, Kelle Stephens
- Mountainland Technical College, Lehi
  - President, Clay Christensen
- Ogden–Weber Technical College, Ogden
  - President, James Taggart
- Southwest Technical College, Cedar City
  - President, Brennan Wood
- Tooele Technical College, Tooele
  - President, Scott Snelson
- Uintah Basin Technical College, Roosevelt
  - President, Aaron Weight
