= Mountainland Technical College =

Public technical college in Lehi, Utah, United States

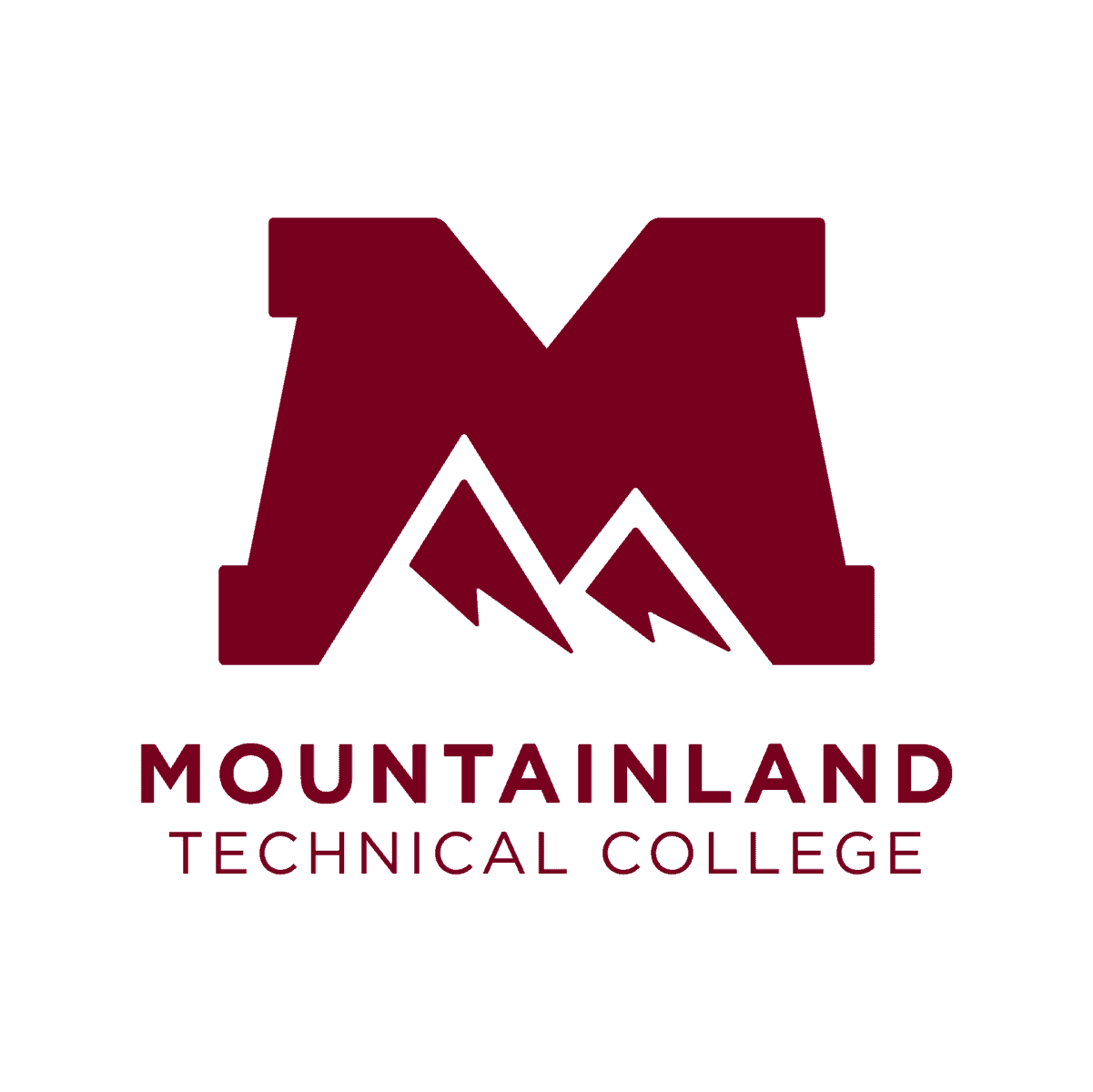
- Type: Technical College, Trade School
- Established: 1989; 37 years ago
- Parent institution: Utah System of Higher Education
- Accreditation: COE
- President: Clay Christensen
- Location: Lehi, Utah, U.S. 40°25′12″N 111°53′8″W
- Campus: Multiple Sites
- Colors: Maroon, grey, black, white
- Website: www.mtec.edu

Mountainland Technical College (MTECH) is a public community college in Lehi, Utah with additional campuses in Orem, Spanish Fork, and Provo. MTECH also offers courses in cooperation with Utah Valley University at UVU's Wasatch campus in Heber.

== Mountainland Applied Technology College ==
In 2017, the Utah State Legislature replaced the Utah College of Applied Technology with the Utah System of Technical Colleges (USTC). Each of the former regional applied technology colleges was renamed as a "technical college." Thus, Mountainland Applied Technology College (MATC) was renamed to Mountainland Technical College (MTECH).

== Mountainland Technical College ==
In May 2019, MTECH broke ground on a second building at their Lehi campus. This building would house their automated manufacturing, machining, information technology, and other programs. It would be 89,000 square feet, two stories high, and was projected to open in the fall of 2020.

The college began construction of a campus in Payson in September 2023. classes at the new campus are expected to begin in 2025.

In late 2023, the college announced a five-million dollar capital campaign, On the Rise, that was to officially begin on the first of January 2024.

Transferable course programs are in the following fields: Automotive Technology, Diesel Technology, Medical Billing, Medical Coding, Medical Billing and Coding, Medical Assisting, Welding Technology, and Web Programming & Development.
