= J. W. Robinson =

American politician

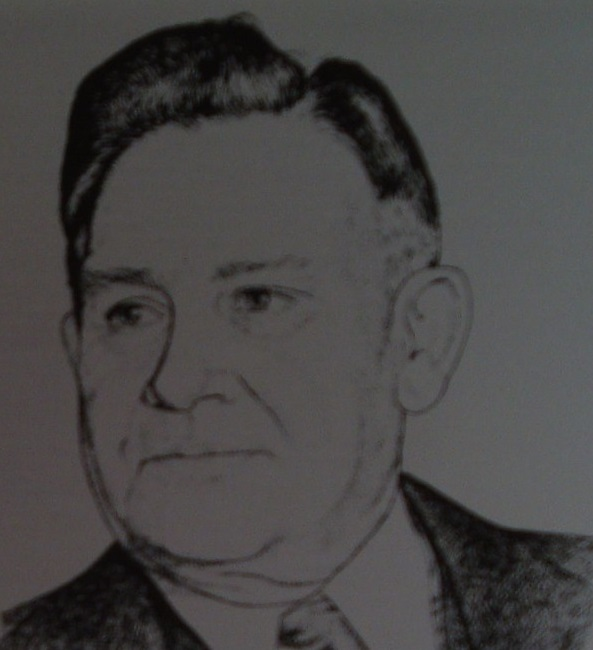
- From lobby plaque on display in J. Will Robinson Federal Building, Provo, UT

Member of the U.S. House of Representatives from Utah's 2nd district
- In office March 4, 1933 – January 3, 1947
- Preceded by: Frederick C. Loofbourow
- Succeeded by: William A. Dawson

Personal details
- Born: January 19, 1878 Coalville, Utah Territory
- Died: December 2, 1964 (aged 86) Escondido, California, U.S.
- Party: Democratic
- Education: Brigham Young University (BA); University of Chicago (JD)

James William Robinson (January 19, 1878 – December 2, 1964) was an American attorney and politician who served as a member of the United States House of Representatives for Utah's 2nd congressional district from 1933 to 1947.

== Early life and education ==
Born in Coalville in the Utah Territory, Robinson attended public schools. He graduated from Brigham Young University with a Bachelor of Arts degree in 1908 and received his J.D. from the University of Chicago Law School in 1912.

== Career ==
While attending college and law school. Robinson served as principal of Uinta Academy in Vernal, Utah, and Wasatch High School in Heber, Utah. He was admitted to the bar in 1912 and practiced law in Utah County, Utah from 1912 to 1933.

Robinson served as county attorney of Utah County from 1918 to 1921 and was the Democratic candidate for attorney general of Utah in 1924. He served as member of the board of regents of the University of Utah from 1925 to 1935.

Robinson was elected as a Democrat to the Seventy-third and to the six succeeding Congresses (March 4, 1933 – January 3, 1947). He served as chairman of the Committee on Public Lands (Seventy-sixth and Seventy-seventh Congresses), Committee on Roads (Seventy-eighth and Seventy-ninth Congresses).

He was an unsuccessful candidate for reelection in 1946 to the Eightieth Congress. He served as director of grazing in the Bureau of Land Management from January 3, 1947, to January 31, 1949. He then returned to Salt Lake City, Utah.

== Personal life ==
Robinson died in Escondido, California, December 2, 1964 and is buried in Provo City Cemetery, Provo.

== See also ==
- List of members of the House Un-American Activities Committee

== Sources ==
- United States Congress. "J. W. Robinson (id: R000341)". Biographical Directory of the United States Congress.

U.S. House of Representatives
| Preceded by Frederick C. Loofbourow | Member of the U.S. House of Representatives from Utah's 2nd congressional district 1933-1947 | Succeeded by William A. Dawson |
