= Utah State Industrial School =

Coordinates: 41°14′45″N 112°00′27″W

- 200 N. Washington Blvd. Ogden, Utah 84404; United States

Information
- Type: Reform school
- Established: 1888
- Enrollment: 350

Utah State Industrial School was a juvenile reform school that operated in Ogden, Utah from October 31, 1889 to 1983.

== History ==
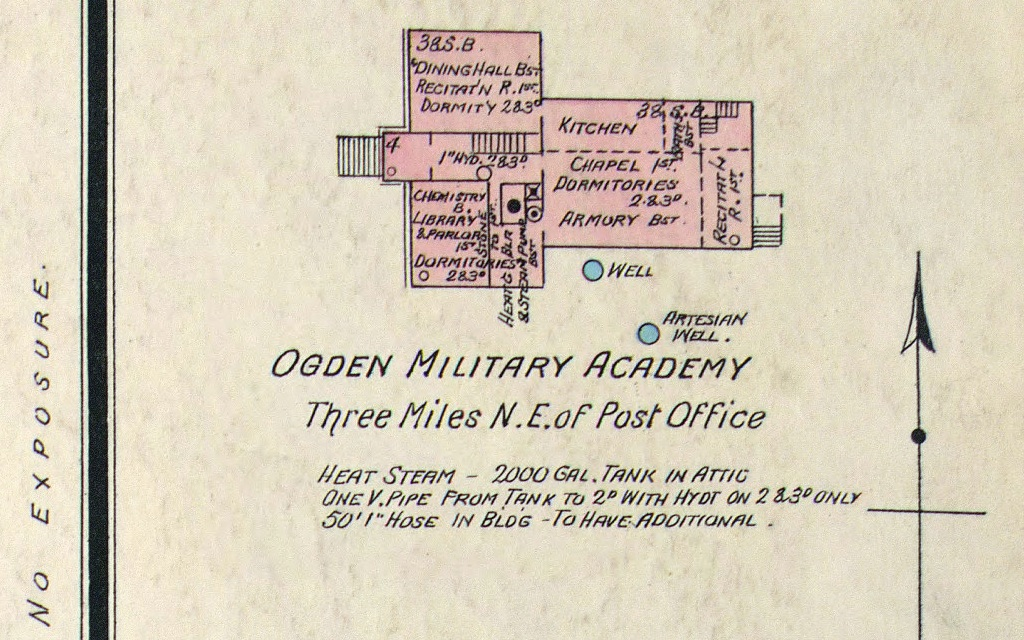
In 1896, the school took over the former site of the Ogden Military Academy.

In 1888, the Utah Territorial Assembly passed the Reform School bill, at the initiative of Salt Lake City attorney James Moyle, to help juvenile delinquents by teaching new skills and improving habits. In May 1888, a committee researched schools around the United States to determine which model would be best for the Utah Territory.

The Utah Territorial Reform School opened in Ogden on October 31, 1889. Boys and girls lived in the same dormitories during the first ten years, but daily activities, were divided by gender. Discipline was an ongoing concern deemed necessary to keep children in line at the school. Punishment ranged from deprivation of meals and privileges, to solitary confinement, whipping, and the use of restraints. Youths were confined at the school by the order of juvenile court judges.

On June 24, 1891, a fire destroyed most of the building, including the resident halls. The Ogden Military Academy offered its vacant buildings to operate in while the school was to be rebuilt. In 1896, the school permanently took over the site of the old military academy. With Utah becoming a state, the school was officially renamed the Utah State Industrial School.

=== Investigations ===
The school was placed under repeated scrutiny over the course of the 20th century. In 1909, it was investigated for graft. In October 1963, political pressure was brought upon the state after a rash of escapes by internees culminated in the shooting death of Detective Sergeant Marshall N. White. In 1973, the state considered closing the school because of overcrowding and a lack of adequate facilities. In 1977, it was renamed the Youth Development Center.

The Utah affiliate of the American Civil Liberties Union brought suit against the center in the 1980s, charging it with inhumane conditions of confinement. The center was finally closed in 1983 and replaced by two newer facilities in Ogden and Salt Lake City as Utah moved towards community-based treatment and rehabilitation instead of incarceration of juvenile offenders. In 1984, the site became the present-day location of Ogden–Weber Technical College.

== Notable internees ==
- Jack Abbott - Author and career criminal who claimed he was scarred for life by the school guards.
- Ronnie Lee Gardner - Robber and double murderer who was later executed by firing squad.
