= Reva Beck Bosone =

American attorney and politician (1895–1983)

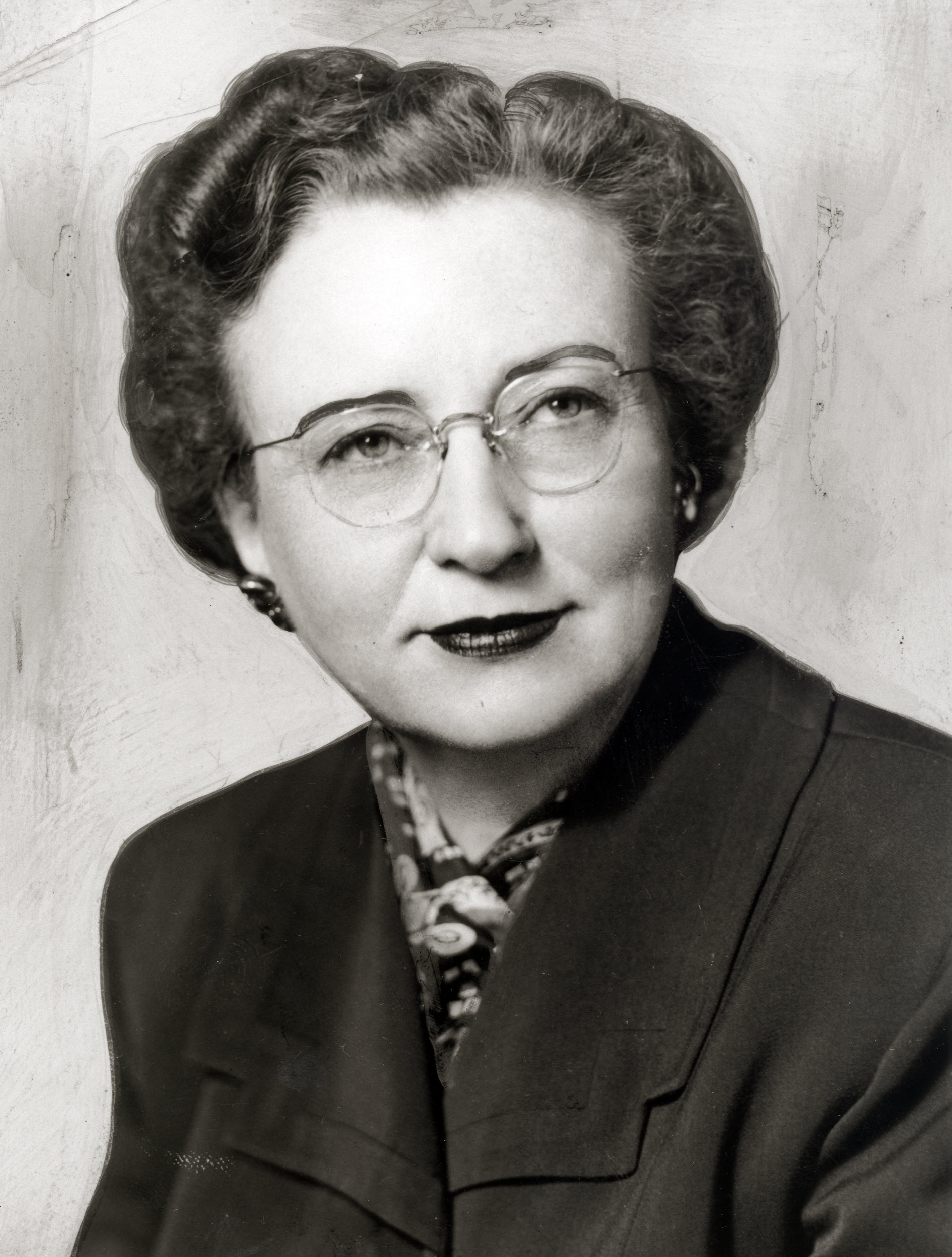

Member of the U.S. House of Representatives from Utah's 2nd district
- In office January 3, 1949 – January 3, 1953
- Preceded by: William A. Dawson
- Succeeded by: William A. Dawson

Member of the Utah House of Representatives
- In office 1933-1935

Personal details
- Born: April 2, 1895 American Fork, Utah Territory
- Died: July 21, 1983 (aged 88) Vienna, Virginia
- Party: Democratic
- Spouse(s): Harold G. Cutler (m. 1920–1921); Joseph Bosone (m. 1929–1940)
- Children: 1
- Education: Westminster Junior College; University of California at Berkeley; University of Utah College of Law
- Profession: Lawyer

Reva Zilpha Beck Bosone (April 2, 1895 – July 21, 1983) was an American attorney and politician. She was a U.S. representative from Utah for two terms from 1949 to 1953.

She was the first woman elected to Congress from Utah.

== Early life and education ==
Born in American Fork in the Utah Territory, the daughter of a Danish immigrant father, Bosone attended public schools and graduated from high school in 1915. She graduated from Westminster Junior College in 1917 and from the University of California at Berkeley in 1919. She taught high school 1920–1927. She graduated from the University of Utah College of Law at Salt Lake City in 1930 and was admitted to the bar the same year. Bosone was the 14th woman admitted to the Utah State Bar.

== Career ==
She then practiced law in Helper, Utah, from 1931 to 1933 and Salt Lake City from 1933 to 1936. She served as member of the State house of representatives 1933–1935, serving as floor leader in 1935.

Bosone was elected Salt Lake City judge in 1936 and served until elected to Congress. During the Second World War, she was chairman of Women's Army Corps Civilian Advisory Committee of the Ninth Service Command. In the 1940s, Bosone hosted her own weekly radio show on KDLY called Her Honor, the Judge, in which she presented legal case studies. She served as official observer at the United Nations Conference at San Francisco in 1945 and as the first director of Utah State Board for Education on Alcoholism in 1947 and 1948.

=== Congress ===
Bosone was elected as a Democrat to the Eighty-first and Eighty-second Congresses (January 3, 1949 – January 3, 1953). While in office, Bosone advocated for social welfare programs including extending Social Security for military personnel, and voted against the Subversive Activities Control and Communist Registration Act. In 1949–1951 Bosone served on the Public Lands Committee, and in 1951–1953 she also served on the House Administration Committee. She was an unsuccessful candidate for reelection in 1952 to the Eighty-third Congress and for election in 1954 to the Eighty-fourth Congress.

=== Later career ===
She served as delegate to Democratic National Conventions in 1952 and 1956. She resumed the practice of law in Salt Lake City from 1953 to 1957 and was legal counsel to Safety and Compensation Subcommittee of House Committee on Education and Labor 1957–1960. She was also a judicial officer of the Post Office Department in 1961–1968. Bosone was awarded an honorary doctorate by the University of Utah in 1977.

== Death ==
She was a resident of Vienna, Virginia, until her death there July 21, 1983.

== See also ==
- List of first women lawyers and judges in Utah
- Women in the United States House of Representatives

U.S. House of Representatives
Preceded by William A. Dawson	Member of the U.S. House of Representatives from Utah's 2nd congressional district 1949-1953	Succeeded by William A. Dawson
