= Frank Galey =

American academic

Utah State University Provost
- In office August 1, 2019 – June 30, 2022
- Preceded by: Noelle E. Cockett
- Succeeded by: Larry Smith

Personal details
- Born: Francis D. Galey Big Horn, Wyoming
- Spouse: Donna Brown
- Education: Colorado State University(B.A.), (DVM); University of Illinois (Ph.D)
- Profession: Veterinarian

Francis D. "Frank" Galey is the former Provost of Utah State University. A notable scholar and author in the veterinary sciences, he has written or edited over 17 books. Previously the Dean of The University of Wyoming College of Agriculture and Natural Resources, and has previously been employed at the UC Davis School of Veterinary Medicine. It was announced he would retire effective July 1, 2022. He will be replaced by current VP of Statewide Campuses, Larry Smith.

== Personal life ==
Galey is married to Donna Brown and the couple has four adult children.

== Published works ==
- Galey FD: Effective use of an analytical laboratory for toxicology problems. In: (Kirk RW, ed.) Current Veterinary Therapy XI. W.B. Saunders, Philadelphia, 168-172, 1992.
- Galey FD: Invited Section Editor, Toxicology Section. In: (Robinson NE, ed.) Current Therapy in Equine Medicine 3rd ed. W.B. Saunders, Philadelphia, (10 Cptrs) 337-380, 1992.
- Galey FD: Diagnostic toxicology. In: (Robinson NE, ed.) Current Therapy in Equine Medicine 3rd ed. W.B. Saunders, Philadelphia, 337-340, 1992.
- Galey FD, Beasley VR, Twardock AR, Whiteley HE, Goetz TE, Hall JO, Manual R: Pathophysiologic effects of an aqueous extract of black walnut (Juglans nigra) when administered via nasogastric tube to the horse. In: Poisonous Plants, Proceedings of the 3rd International Symposium on Poisonous Plants. 630-635, 1992.
- Galey FD: Arsenic. In: (Howard J, ed.) Current Veterinary Therapy: Food Animal Practice 3rd ed. W.B. Saunders, Philadelphia, 394-396, 1992.
- Galey FD, Holstege DM, Richardson E, and Whitehead G: Poisonous plant diagnostics in California. In: (Colegate SM & Dorling PR, eds) Plant-Associated Toxins: Agricultural, Phytochemical, & Ecological Aspects. CAB Int'l, Wallingford, UK, 101-106, 1994.
- Galey FD: Disorders caused by toxicants (also invited Section Editor). In: (Smith BP, ed) Large Animal Internal Medicine 2nd ed. CV Mosby, Philadelphia, 1874–1876 1995.
- Galey FD: Plants and other natural toxicants. In: (Smith BP, ed) Large Animal Internal Medicine 2nd ed. CV Mosby, Philadelphia, 1877–1902, 1995.
- Galey FD: Invited Section Editor, Toxicology Section. In: (Robinson NE, ed.) Current Therapy in Equine Medicine 4th ed. W.B. Saunders, Philadelphia, (8 Cptrs) 649-673, 1997.
- Galey FD: Diagnostic toxicology. In: (Robinson NE, ed.) Current Therapy in Equine Medicine 4th ed. W.B. Saunders, Philadelphia, 652-655, 1997.
- Mostrom MS, Coppock RW, Campbell CAJ, Johnson CI, Khan AA, Galey FD, and Stair EL: Diagnostic and monitoring procedures to determine poisoning by contaminants from the petroleum industry. In: (Chalmers GE, ed) A Literature Review and Discussion of the Toxicological Hazards of Oilfield Pollutants in Cattle. Alberta Research Council, Vegreville, AB, 271-326, 1997.
- Galey FD: Mycotoxins and mycotoxicoses. In: (Hirsch DC & Zee, eds) Reviews of Veterinary Microbiology 2nd ed. Blackwell Scientific Publications, In press, 1998.
- Galey FD: Tremorgenic Mycotoxins. In: (Howard JL & Smith R, eds) Current Veterinary Therapy 4: Food Animal Practice 4th ed. WB Saunders, Philadelphia, 260, 1999.
- Galey FD: Oleander (Nerium oleander) Toxicosis. In: (Howard JL & Smith R, eds) Current Veterinary Therapy 4: Food Animal Practice 4th ed. WB Saunders, Philadelphia, 275-276, 1999.
- Osweiler GD, Galey FD: Guest editors for Toxicology: Vet Clin N Am: Food Anim Practice 16:Preface xi-xii; November, 2000.
- Galey FD: Approach to Diagnosis and Initial Treatment for the Toxicology Case in (Peterson and Talcott, eds) Small Animal Toxicology, WB Saunders, Philadelphia, 99-113, 2001.
- Galey FD: Guest editor for Toxicology: Vet Clin N Am: Equine Practice 17:Preface xi-xii; December, 2001.

== Selected awards ==
- 2012: Guardian of the Grasslands for service to the state, from the Wyoming Stock Growers Association
- 2012: Amigo award for service to the industry and state, from the Wyoming Wool Growers
