= Duchesne High School (Utah) =

Location
- 175 West Main Street; Duchesne, Utah 84021; United States; 40°09′50″N 110°24′15″W

Information
- Type: Public, senior high school
- School district: Duchesne County School District
- Principal: Darron Gatherum
- Grades: 7-12
- Enrollment: 410 (2023-2024)
- Color
- Mascot: Eagle
- Website: dhs.dcsd.org/o/dhs

Duchesne High School is a grade 7-12 secondary school in Duchesne, Utah, United States, and is part of the Duchesne County School District. The school serves all of Duchesne City as well as the communities of Bridgeland, Utahn, Strawberry, and Fruitland.

== Name ==
Duchesne High School is named after its city and the city's river. The river was probably named by trappers in the 1820s after Saint Philippine Duchesne.

== Facilities ==
The current structure was built in 2004-2005. The facility has two gymnasiums, one college sized basketball court and one smaller gymnasium left from the 1965 structure. It has an English department with classrooms and separate writing lab. The science department has classrooms and a separate lab. Utah State University provides distance education classes at the school so all students have the opportunity to graduate from high school with an associate degree. The school also has wood and metal shops, an auditorium, lunch room, and administrative offices.

== Sports ==
Duchesne High school colors are navy blue, white, and gray; its mascot is the eagle.

The school sponsors a men's football team, men's and women's basketball teams, men's wrestling, women's volleyball, track and field team and cross country team. Duchesne High competes in the 1A division of the UHSAA. Men's teams have won state titles in basketball (1989), football (2006, 2010, 2011, 2012, 2013, 2016), wrestling (1981, 2008, and 2015), and track and field (1993, 2004, 2005, 2011, 2012). Duchesne has sponsored athletes who have achieved all-region, all-state, all-American, and even a finalist for the High School Heisman in 2007. During the 2010-2014 seasons, the football team set an all-classification state record of 48 consecutive victories.

== History ==
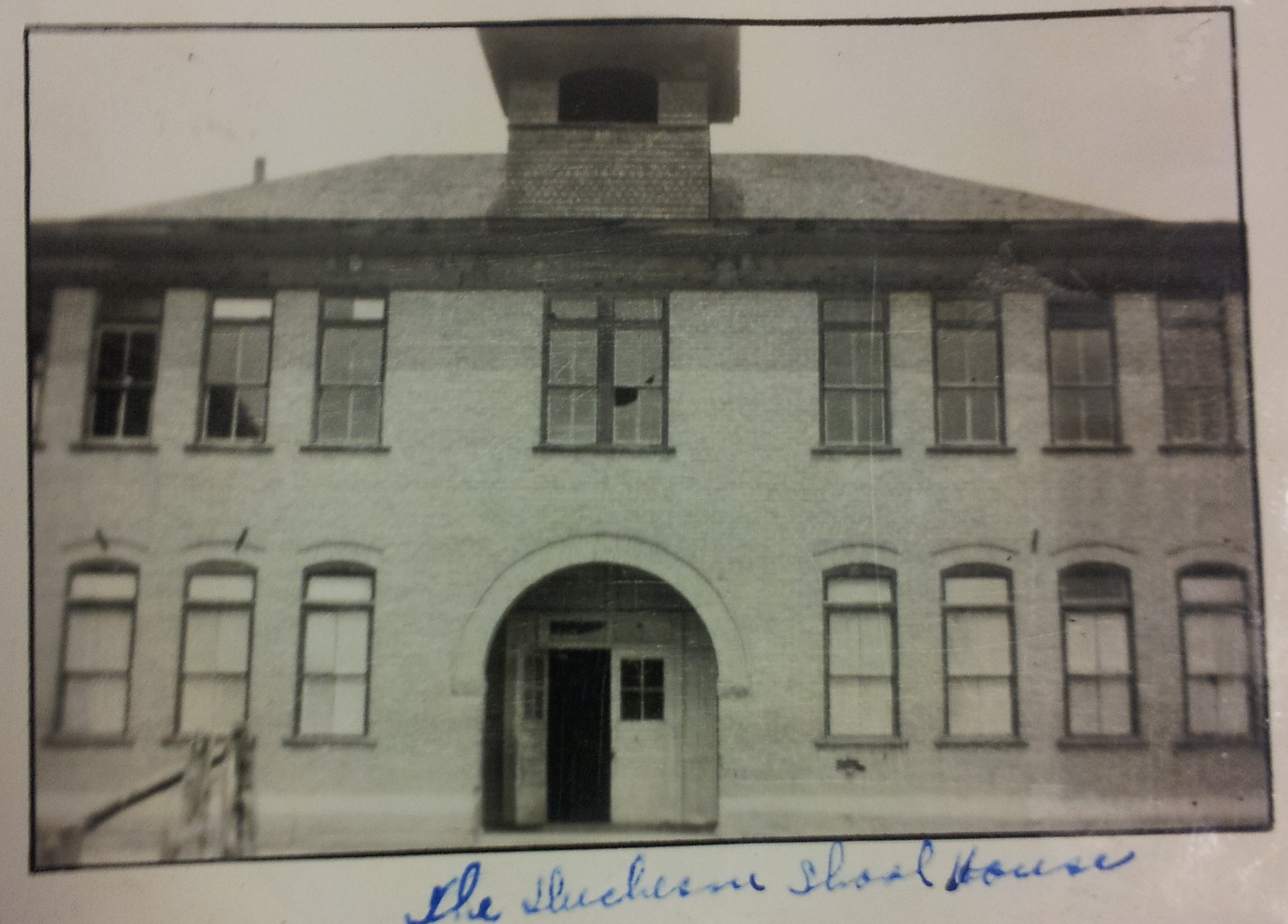
1907 Duchesne Public School

1905 – Duchesne city has hosted grades 1–8 since 1905.

1907-08 – The first official school building was built.

1921- – Ninth grade curriculum was added. More curriculum on the 10th grade level was added through the late 1920s.

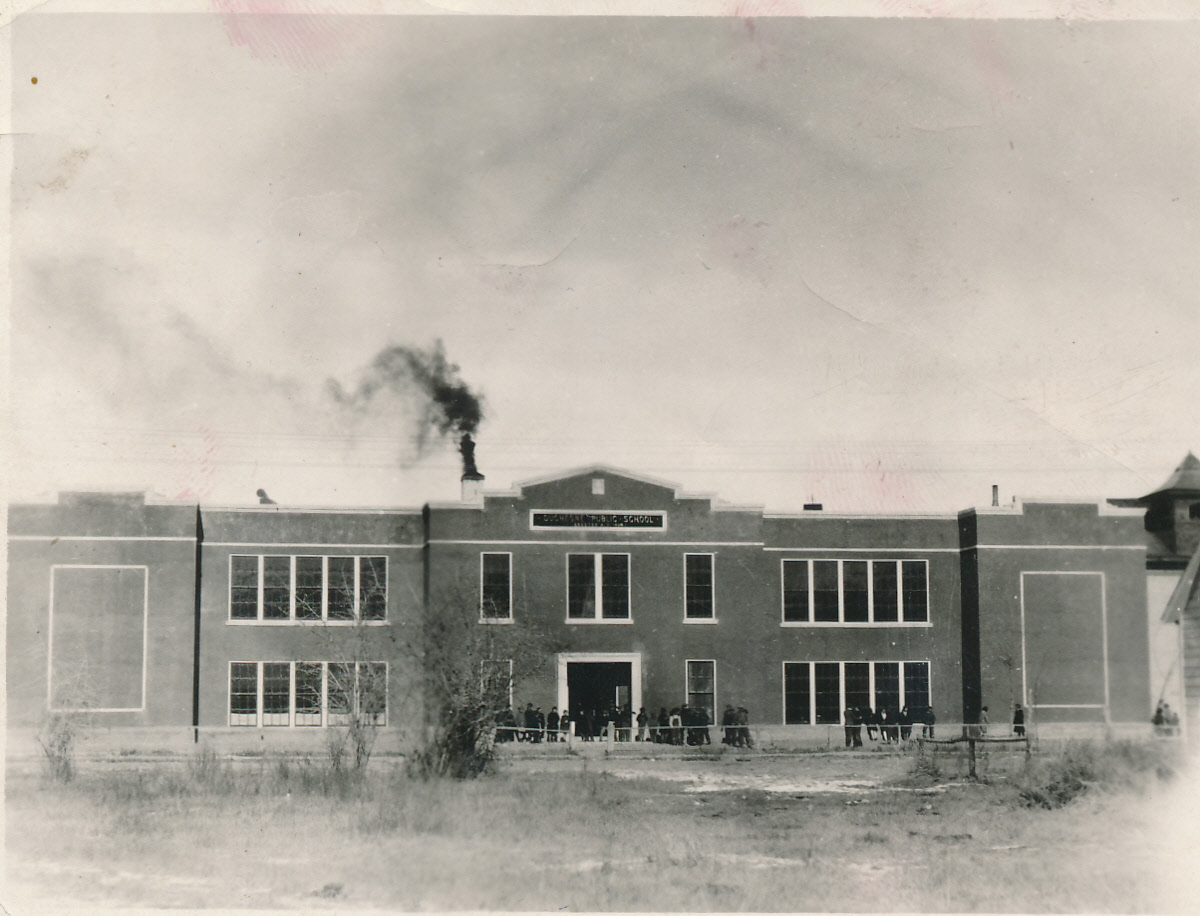
Duchesne School 1926

1926 – The original 1907 building was abandoned and a new Duchesne Public School was built that housed Kindergarten - 10th grades.

1931 – On May 17, 1931 the Duchesne Public school held a graduation ceremony for four students that composed the first senior class.

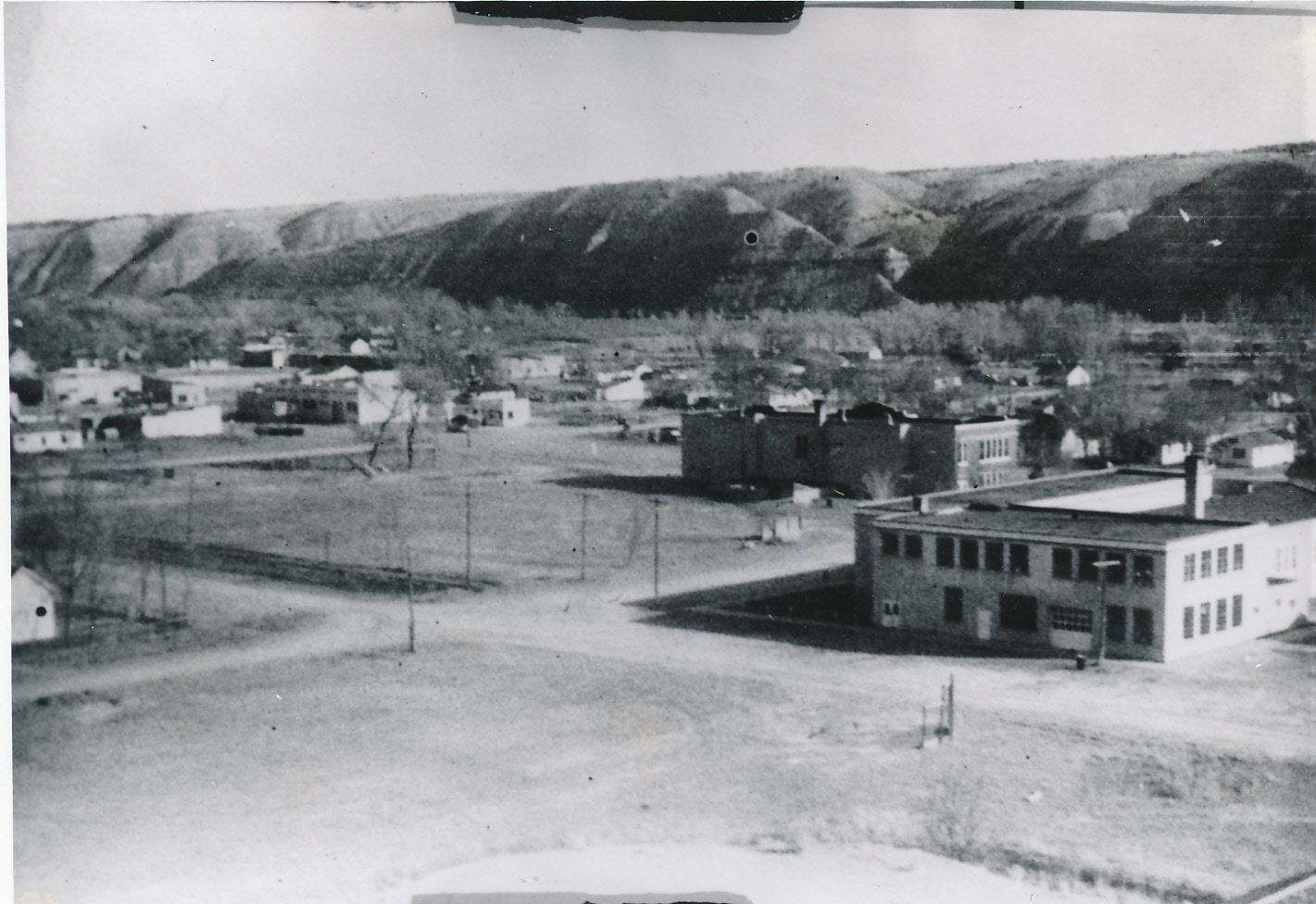
Duchesne Utah Schools circa 1940

1936–1937 – After acquiring land on the corner of 200 West and 100 North, construction started on a separate high school building in June 1936. Ground water issues caused problems with pouring the foundation; these were alleviated by installing tiles and channeling the ground water to the basement of the 1912 building, where it was pumped out to the street. The high school was finished in the late fall of 1936 and final payment was made to the Tolboe and Tolboe company for construction. The 1907 structure was torn down and materials used to construct the 40' × 60' Manual Arts building just west of the new high school.

1965 – 100 North Street was closed down between 200 West and 400 West. A gymnasium, class rooms, science labs, and administrative offices expanded the old 1935 structure. The old 1926 building was torn down that hosted the elementary school. A new elementary school was built north of the new high school, and is still in use today. The new high school building included science labs, classrooms, library, and a gymnasium. The old track was moved to the west of the high school.

1980~ – The old 1936 structure was torn down and replaced with a wrestling gymnasium, art room, wood and metal shop, more classrooms, and an auditorium.

1981 – The wrestling team of 1981 won for Duchesne High its first ever athletic State Championship.

2004 – 200 West Street was closed between Main Street and 100 North Street. Most of the 1965 structure was torn down, except for the gymnasium, and replaced by the current two-story structure.

2011 – Houses along Main Street and 300 West Street were purchased and demolished to make way for the reconfiguration of the athletic field from an east–west to a north–south configuration.
