= Tooele Technical College =

Public technical college in Tooele, Utah, United States

Coordinates: 40°31′51″N 112°18′01″W

- Type: Public technical college
- Parent institution: Utah System of Higher Education
- President: Kent Thygerson (Interim President)
- Students: 325 undergraduates
- Location: Tooele, Utah, United States
- Website: www.tooeletech.edu

Tooele Technical College is a public technical school in Tooele, Utah. It is part of the Utah System of Technical Colleges. Tooele Technical College offers high school students and adults living in Tooele County programs in Business, Health Care, Information, Manufacturing, Transportation, and Service Industry Technologies.
