= Galey-Buzat =

Galey-Buzat Галей-Бузат
- Village
- Location within Bashkortostan Location within Russia
- Coordinates: 53°14′N 54°42′E
- Country: Russia
- Region: Bashkortostan
- District: Sterlibashevsky District
- Time zone: UTC+5:00

Galey-Buzat (Russian: Галей-Бузат; Bashkir: Ғәли-Буҙат, Ğäli-Buźat) is a rural locality (a village) in Buzatovsky Selsoviet, Sterlibashevsky District, Bashkortostan, Russia. The population was 8 as of 2010. There is 1 street.

== Geography ==
Galey-Buzat is located 55 km southwest of Sterlibashevo (the district's administrative centre) by road. Starolyubino is the nearest rural locality.
