= Dixie Technical College =

Technical training school in southern Utah

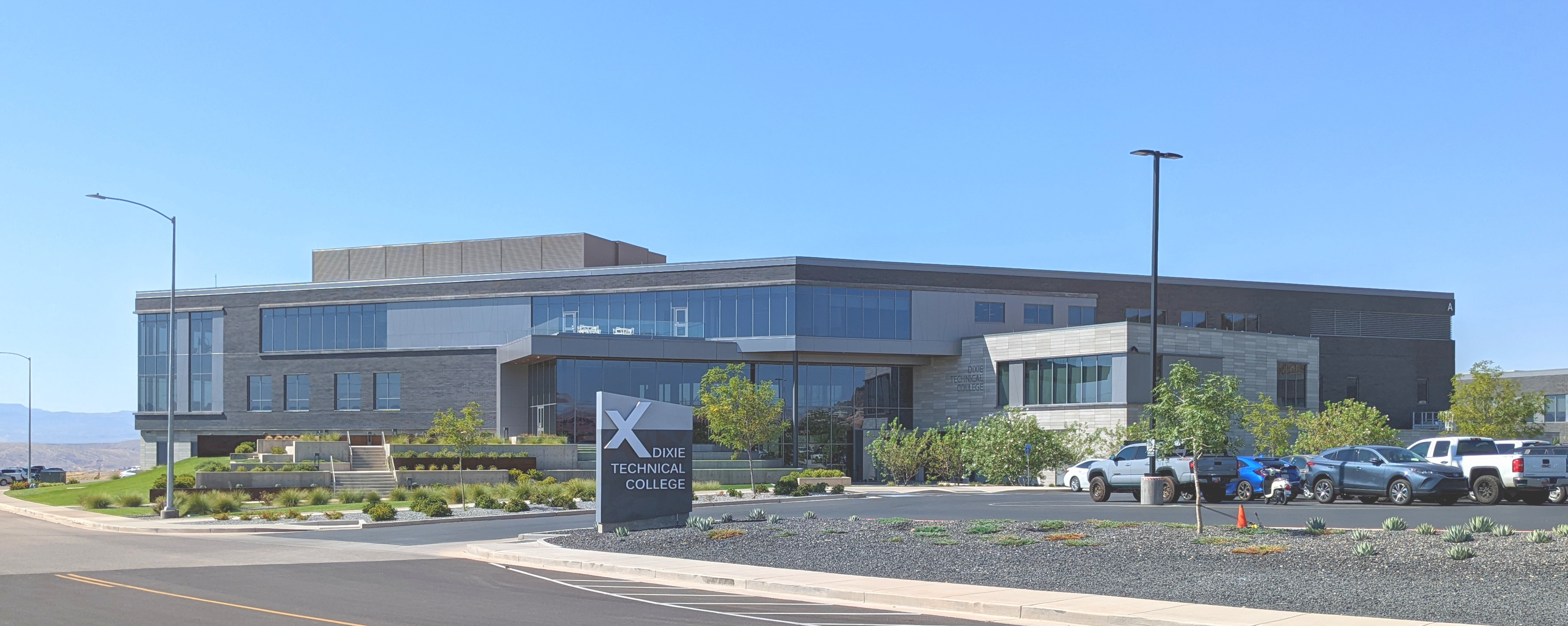
- Dixie Technical College campus
- Other names: Dixie Tech
- Former names: Dixie Applied Technology College
- Type: Public technical college
- Established: 2001
- Parent institution: Utah System of Higher Education
- Accreditation: Council on Occupational Education
- President: Jordan Rushton
- Location: St. George, Utah, United States; 37.0993°N 113.5915°W
- Website: www.dixietech.edu

Dixie Technical College (Dixie Tech) is a public technical college in St. George, Utah, United States. It is part of the Utah System of Higher Education. Dixie Tech was established in 2001 by the Utah State Legislature and offers certificate programs accredited by the Council on Occupational Education.

== History ==
Dixie Tech was established on September 1, 2001, by the Utah State Legislature. It moved to its current campus on St. George's Tech Ridge in 2018. Before that, it was called Dixie Applied Technology College or DXATC, but that was changed when all institutions of the now defunct Utah System of Technical Colleges took on "Technical College" in their names. In 2020, the Utah System of Technical Colleges was subsumed into the Utah System of Higher Education.
