= Bridgerland Technical College =

Public community college in Logan, Utah

- Type: Public community college
- Established: September 17, 1971; 54 years ago (as Bridgerland Area Vocational Center)
- Parent institution: Utah System of Higher Education
- Accreditation: Council on Occupational Education
- President: Chad K. Campbell
- Students: 1,534 (Fall 2023)
- Location: Logan, Utah, United States; 41°45′20″N 111°51′02″W
- Colors: Red and gray
- Website: www.btech.edu

Bridgerland Technical College (BTECH), formerly Bridgerland Applied Technical college (BATC), is a public community college in Logan, Utah. It is part of the Utah System of Higher Education. The main campus is located in Logan with two satellite campuses in Brigham City and Woodruff, Utah.

== Campuses ==
The campuses located in Logan are the Main campus, which provides the majority of courses offered, a cafeteria and bookstore; and the West campus, an extension of the Main campus, which provides courses which are entirely new, or transferred from the main campus.

The Brigham City and Rich County campuses offer scaled-down versions of main campus offerings.

== Dual enrollment ==
The Logan campus offers classes to high school juniors and seniors who are enrolled in a high school in the Cache County School District, the Logan School District, and the Box Elder School District. Almost all classes are free to take, with the exception of lab fees in some of the classes.
