= Southwest Technical College =

Public college in Cedar City, Utah, US

Coordinates: 37°39′51″N 113°04′12″W

- Type: Public technical college
- Parent institution: Utah System of Technical Colleges
- President: Brennan Wood
- Administrative staff: 200 employees
- Location: Cedar City, Utah, United States
- Website: www.stech.edu

Southwest Technical College (Southwest Tech) is a public technical college in Cedar City, Utah. It serves Beaver, Garfield, Iron and Kane counties. In addition to its campus in Cedar City, Southwest Tech also operates a campus in Kanab, Utah. Southwest Tech focuses on certificate programs and is accredited by the Council on Occupational Education. It is one of eight regional technical colleges in Utah in the Utah System of Technical Colleges.

== History ==
Southwest Tech was founded in the late 1990s. Dana Miller was the college's president in the early 2000s. He was succeeded by Brennan Wood who was appointed in 2014 following Miller's retirement. A new $19.3 million building was constructed and completed in 2016. In the summer of 2015, Southwest Tech received a $200,000 grant from the George S. and Dolores Dore Eccles Foundation to purchase classroom and lab equipment for the new campus, especially in support of the new Health Professions and Trades Building. In fall of 2016, Southwest Tech launched the Utah Aerospace Pathway Initiative. This initiative is a partnership between Southwest Tech, the Government Office of Economic Development, Iron County School District, and MSC Aerospace.

== Accreditations ==
- Council on Occupational Education
