= Ogden–Weber Technical College =

Technical college in Ogden, Utah, US

Ogden-Weber Technical College
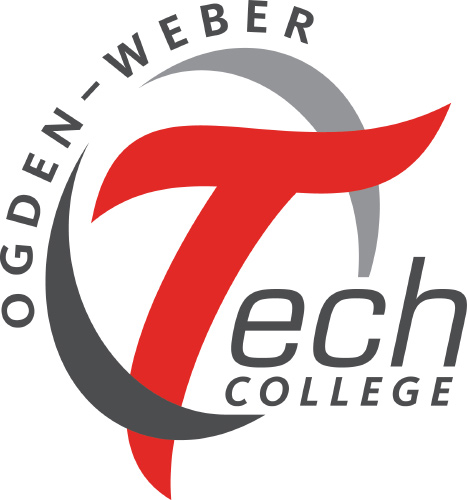
- Type: Public, two-year technical college
- Established: 1971
- Affiliations: USTC, Utah System of Higher Education
- President: James R. Taggart
- Location: Ogden, Utah, United States; 41°15′51″N 111°57′53″W
- Campus: Urban
- Colors: Red and black
- Website: www.otech.edu

Ogden–Weber Technical College (also referred to as OTECH, Ogden-Weber Tech or OWTC) is a public technical college in Ogden, Utah. It is one of the largest of the eight technical colleges within the Utah System of Higher Education (USHE). The college offers open-entry, open-exit, competency-based education targeted at technical skills and job placement (also called career and technical education). The college provides technical training in 32 different programs. Primary career clusters include Business and IT, Construction, Health, Manufacturing and Service occupations.

== History ==
The college opened its doors in April 1971. At that time it was known as Skills Center North. The institution helped adult students learn new job skills to attain employment. The student body consisted of 100 students. By 1975, the Utah Board of Regents incorporated Skills Center North as part of Weber State College. Within several years the Center's training programs had received full state and regional accreditation which opened the door to allowing high school students to attend the Center while completing their high school graduation requirements. The student body grew to exceed 750 adult and high school students (both full-time and part-time). In 1982, the Center was moved under the auspices of the Utah State Office of Education and was renamed the Ogden-Weber Area Vocational Center. The student body grew to over 1,200 students. In 1984, the Center moved its campus to its present-day location, formerly the site of the Utah State Industrial School and Ogden Military Academy, to accommodate the need for more classrooms with a steadily increasing student body. The name was changed to the Ogden-Weber Applied Technology Center in the early 1990s.

The then center celebrated its 30-year anniversary in 2001. During that year the Utah State Legislature created the Utah College of Applied Technology (UCAT) and identified Ogden-Weber as the regional campus of UCAT serving Weber County. The center was renamed the Ogden–Weber Applied Technology College. In 2017, the Utah State legislature renamed the institution as the Ogden–Weber Technical College. The college is an independent member of the Utah System of Technical Colleges. With an annual enrollment of more than 7,500 students, the college provides technical training in thirty-two different high-demand programs.

== Location ==
Ogden–Weber Technical College is located in Ogden, Utah, with an extension campus at Business Depot Ogden.
