= Provo College =

Private for-profit college in Utah, United States

- Type: Private for-profit college
- Established: 1984
- Parent institution: Unitek Learning
- Affiliations: Eagle Gate College
- Location: Provo, Utah, United States
- Campus: Single campus (Provo)
- Website: www.provocollege.edu

Provo College is a private for-profit institution in the United States. Founded in 1984, Provo College maintains a campus in the Utah Valley. The college is affiliated with Eagle Gate College and is part of Unitek Learning, a healthcare education group. Provo College programs focus on Nursing and Physical therapy.

== History ==
Provo College was founded in 1984 under the name Dental Careers Institute and was later changed to Advanced Careers Institute. In December 1989, the institution adopted the name Provo College to reflect a broadened program scope.

In 1992, Provo College was acquired by the Center for Professional Studies, Inc. and relocated to its current location. In 2005, the school changed its degree offering from Associate of Applied Science to Associate of Science. By 2013, Provo expanded to offer bachelor's degrees.

In 2019, the college opened a non-main campus in Idaho Falls, Idaho, accredited by ABHES. This location was later renamed Eagle Gate College. By 2020, both Provo College and Eagle Gate College had become part of the Unitek Learning network.

== Academics ==
As of 2025, Provo College offers programs in Practical Nursing, a Bachelor of Science in Nursing (BSN), and a Physical Therapist Assistant (PTA) program.

== Accreditation ==
Provo College is institutionally accredited by the Accrediting Bureau of Health Education Schools (ABHES), which accredits its diploma, associate, and baccalaureate programs.

- The PTA associate degree program is accredited by the Commission on Accreditation in Physical Therapy Education (CAPTE).
- The BSN degree is accredited by the Commission on Collegiate Nursing Education (CCNE).

== Campus ==
Provo College operates a single campus in Provo, Utah.

== Student demographics ==
In 2024, 88% of Provo College’s students were women. By ethnicity, 64.1% were White/Caucasian, 16% Hispanic, 11.5% unknown, 1.8% Asian, 0.9% Black or African American, 1.2% American Indian or Alaska Native, 1.9% Native Hawaiian or Pacific Islander, and 2.5% two or more races.
