= Union High School (Utah) =

Location
- 135 N Union; Roosevelt, Utah 84066; United States; 40.3010°N 109.9765°W

Information
- Type: Public high school
- School district: Duchesne County School District
- CEEB code: 450345
- NCES School ID: 490024000171
- Principal: Benjamin Felder
- Faculty: 36 (2013–2014)
- Grades: 09 - 12
- Enrollment: 1,155 (2023-2024)
- Campus type: Rural
- Colors: Black and gold
- Mascot: Cosmo the Cougar
- Newspaper: The Cougar Chronicle
- Website: uhs.dcsd.org/o/uhs

Union High School is a public high school in Roosevelt, Utah, United States. As of 2025, the school had a student population of 1,155. The school serves both Duchesne County and Uintah County, which is the source of the name. The school is a part of the Duchesne County School District.

In 2013 the school's football coach Matt Labrum chose to suspend the entire football program in response to pervasive behavioral problems amongst the team members, such as cyberbullying and skipping classes. Labrum was supported by the school, and no parents complained about the decision. Players in the program were required to complete community service and improve attendance and grades before being allowed to play again.
