= Uintah Basin Technical College =

Coordinates: 40°17′56″N 109°58′33″W

- Type: Public technical college
- Established: 1968
- Affiliations: UTech, Utah System of Higher Education
- President: Aaron K. Weight
- Location: Roosevelt, Utah, United States
- Website: www.ubtech.edu

Uintah Basin Technical College (UBTech) is a public technical college in Roosevelt, Utah with an additional campus in Vernal. It serves high school students and adults in Daggett, Duchesne, Uintah counties. UBTech is a part of the Utah System of Technical Colleges and offers certificate programs in Business & Industry, Medical, Energy Services, and Trades.
