= Utah State University-Uintah Basin =

Coordinates: 40°18′02″N 109°58′35″W

USU Uintah Basin
- Type: Public
- Affiliations: Utah State University
- Location: Roosevelt & Vernal, Utah, U.S.
- Campus: Statewide Campus
- Website: uintahbasin.usu.edu

Utah State University Uintah Basin is a part of the Utah State University (USU) Statewide Campuses system located in Roosevelt, Utah, with an additional campus in Vernal. The Uintah Basin campus was the first USU regional campus. USU Uintah Basin offers more than 60 degrees, ranging from associates through doctorates, as well as certificate programs.

== Roosevelt Campus ==
USU opened the Uintah Basin campus in Roosevelt after funding was secured by the Utah State Legislature in 1967. The campus grew with the addition of concurrent enrollment courses. In 1989, the Roosevelt campus added a 25,000 sq. foot administrative and educational building, funding for which was supported by the city of Roosevelt, and Duchesne and Uintah counties. The building's design is similar to that of an LDS Church and is commonly referred to as "The Church". In 1993, First Security Bank donated an administrative building, now referred to as "The Bank".

In 2001, the Roosevelt site opened up "The Barn", a $5 million building which houses classrooms, computer labs, student services, and a gymnasium.

== Vernal Campus ==
USU Uintah Basin in Vernal began in high school classrooms, with courses being taught at night. In 1991, USU purchased a 40,000-square-foot building which doubled the classroom space. Bob Williams donated 138 acres in 2005 for the development of a regional campus. The Williams Building, which is shared by Uintah Basin Technical College, houses several classrooms. In 2010, USU opened the Bingham Entrepreneurship and Energy Research Center (BEERC) in Vernal, a 70,000 square-foot research hub with an entrepreneurship center, classrooms, teaching labs, and student services. Named after Marc and Debbie Bingham, who provided $15 million for the project, the center houses offices for the USU Research Foundation's Energy Dynamics Laboratory, Idaho National Laboratory, and USTAR. In February 2011, USU installed a 2,000 lb. bull through the Utah Public Arts program for the BEERC. Located in the middle of a roundabout, the bull "will help identify the Utah State University Uintah Basin campus in Vernal." Designed by Jocelyn Russell, the bull is similar to the "Meet The Challenge" bull found on the Logan Campus of USU.

== Delivery ==
As a regional campus within the USU System, there are four options for course delivery:

Online

Students take courses online at their own pace during the traditional semester schedule. Assignments, discussion, and other communication take place online, and classes do not meet on a regular basis. Bachelor's degrees available online include agribusiness, family life studies, and psychology. Master's degrees available online include English and instructional technology.

Hybrid

Courses are delivered online, but students are usually required to participate in hybrid classes at set times. This allows for streaming video and live chat with other students and the instructor in real-time. Some of the hybrid bachelor's degrees available include elementary education and family, consumer, and human development. Hybrid master's degrees offered include engineering and rehabilitation counseling.

Broadcast

Interactive Video Conferencing (IVC) courses are interactive classes taught in a classroom and broadcast to various locations throughout the state of Utah. Additional classrooms are able to watch video in real-time of the instructor as they teach. Through microphones and camera systems, students in remote sites are able to ask and answer questions and make comments that the instructor is able to answer for all students. Most degrees available through USU's Statewide Campuses are taught using IVC.

Face-to-Face

These are in-person, traditional higher education courses. Students attend classes and are taught by instructors face-to-face. Programs taught at the USU Uintah Basin include bachelor's degree programs in biology, composite biological science, and wildlife science.
