= Roosevelt, Utah =

City in Utah, United States

- City
- Location in Duchesne County and the state of Utah
- Coordinates: 40°17′27″N 109°59′49″W
- Country: United States
- State: Utah
- County: Duchesne
- Founded: 1905
- Named for: Theodore Roosevelt

Area
  - Total: 6.76 sq mi (17.50 km^{2})
  - Land: 6.76 sq mi (17.50 km^{2})
  - Water: 0 sq mi (0.00 km^{2})
- Elevation: 5,197 ft (1,584 m)

Population (2020)
  - Total: 6,747
  - Density: 998.5/sq mi (385.54/km^{2})
- Time zone: UTC-7 (Mountain (MST))
  - Summer (DST): UTC-6 (MDT)
- ZIP code: 84066
- Area code: 435
- FIPS code: 49-64670
- GNIS feature ID: 2410991
- Website: www.rooseveltcity.gov

Roosevelt is a city in Duchesne County, Utah, United States. The population was 6,747 at the 2020 census, an increase of 701 (11.6%) from the 6,046 counted in the 2010 census.

The proper pronunciation of the city's name /ˈroʊzəvɛlt/ ROH-zə-velt is based on how President Theodore Roosevelt pronounced his name: according to the man himself, "pronounced as if it was spelled 'Rosavelt.'"

Roosevelt is home to a regional campus location of Utah State University.

== Geography ==
The city is on the eastern edge of Duchesne County, adjacent to the border with Uintah County. The town of Ballard borders Roosevelt to the east. U.S. Routes 40 and 191 pass through Roosevelt as Main Street, leading east 30 miles (48 km) to Vernal and west 28 miles (45 km) to Duchesne.

According to the United States Census Bureau, the city of Roosevelt has a total area of 5.6 square miles (14.4 km^{2}), all land.

=== Climate ===
According to the Köppen Climate Classification system, Roosevelt has a cold semi-arid climate, abbreviated "BSk" on climate maps. The hottest temperature recorded in Roosevelt was 105 °F (40.6 °C) on July 18, 1998, while the coldest temperature recorded was −47 °F (−43.9 °C) on February 6, 1989.

Climate data for Roosevelt, Utah, 1991–2020 normals, extremes 1986–present
Month	Jan	Feb	Mar	Apr	May	Jun	Jul	Aug	Sep	Oct	Nov	Dec	Year
Record high °F (°C)	59 (15)	67 (19)	80 (27)	88 (31)	99 (37)	104 (40)	105 (41)	101 (38)	99 (37)	87 (31)	73 (23)	62 (17)	105 (41)
Mean maximum °F (°C)	43.8 (6.6)	54.0 (12.2)	70.8 (21.6)	80.3 (26.8)	88.3 (31.3)	96.5 (35.8)	100.0 (37.8)	97.4 (36.3)	81.7 (27.6)	80.8 (27.1)	62.7 (17.1)	48.1 (8.9)	100.4 (38.0)
Mean daily maximum °F (°C)	30.6 (−0.8)	39.8 (4.3)	56.4 (13.6)	65.7 (18.7)	75.5 (24.2)	86.6 (30.3)	93.2 (34.0)	90.4 (32.4)	81.0 (27.2)	66.3 (19.1)	48.9 (9.4)	33.5 (0.8)	64.0 (17.8)
Daily mean °F (°C)	16.3 (−8.7)	25.1 (−3.8)	38.9 (3.8)	47.3 (8.5)	56.8 (13.8)	65.7 (18.7)	72.4 (22.4)	70.0 (21.1)	60.9 (16.1)	47.8 (8.8)	33.3 (0.7)	19.9 (−6.7)	46.2 (7.9)
Mean daily minimum °F (°C)	2.1 (−16.6)	10.4 (−12.0)	21.7 (−5.7)	29.0 (−1.7)	38.1 (3.4)	44.8 (7.1)	51.6 (10.9)	49.7 (9.8)	40.8 (4.9)	29.4 (−1.4)	17.6 (−8.0)	6.3 (−14.3)	28.5 (−2.0)
Mean minimum °F (°C)	−15.1 (−26.2)	−7.2 (−21.8)	8.6 (−13.0)	17.1 (−8.3)	26.3 (−3.2)	35.4 (1.9)	42.7 (5.9)	41.2 (5.1)	29.8 (−1.2)	17.4 (−8.1)	4.9 (−15.1)	−10.6 (−23.7)	−18.3 (−27.9)
Record low °F (°C)	−35 (−37)	−47 (−44)	−6 (−21)	8 (−13)	18 (−8)	27 (−3)	37 (3)	32 (0)	21 (−6)	−4 (−20)	−9 (−23)	−40 (−40)	−47 (−44)
Average precipitation inches (mm)	0.55 (14)	0.39 (9.9)	0.52 (13)	0.74 (19)	0.82 (21)	0.48 (12)	0.45 (11)	0.63 (16)	1.04 (26)	0.87 (22)	0.38 (9.7)	0.54 (14)	7.41 (187.6)
Average snowfall inches (cm)	5.2 (13)	3.4 (8.6)	1.1 (2.8)	0.7 (1.8)	0.0 (0.0)	0.0 (0.0)	0.0 (0.0)	0.0 (0.0)	0.0 (0.0)	0.2 (0.51)	0.6 (1.5)	5.2 (13)	16.4 (41.21)
Average extreme snow depth inches (cm)	5.3 (13)	3.8 (9.7)	1.4 (3.6)	0.0 (0.0)	0.0 (0.0)	0.0 (0.0)	0.0 (0.0)	0.0 (0.0)	0.0 (0.0)	0.2 (0.51)	0.7 (1.8)	4.3 (11)	6.2 (16)
Average precipitation days (≥ 0.01 in)	4.0	4.8	4.0	5.6	6.4	3.3	4.0	5.7	5.7	6.1	4.2	4.9	58.7
Average snowy days (≥ 0.1 in)	2.9	2.2	0.5	0.3	0.0	0.0	0.0	0.0	0.0	0.1	0.4	3.3	9.7
Source 1: NOAA
Source 2: National Weather Service

== Demographics ==
Historical population
Census	Pop.	Note	%±
1910	820		—
1920	1,054		28.5%
1930	1,051		−0.3%
1940	1,264		20.3%
1950	1,628		28.8%
1960	1,812		11.3%
1970	2,005		10.7%
1980	3,842		91.6%
1990	3,915		1.9%
2000	4,299		9.8%
2010	6,046		40.6%
2020	6,747		11.6%
U.S. Decennial Census

=== 2020 census ===
As of the 2020 census, Roosevelt had a population of 6,747. The median age was 28.5 years. 35.9% of residents were under the age of 18 and 8.5% of residents were 65 years of age or older. For every 100 females there were 97.3 males, and for every 100 females age 18 and over there were 96.2 males age 18 and over.

91.8% of residents lived in urban areas, while 8.2% lived in rural areas.

There were 2,139 households in Roosevelt, of which 51.1% had children under the age of 18 living in them. Of all households, 58.6% were married-couple households, 13.9% were households with a male householder and no spouse or partner present, and 20.5% were households with a female householder and no spouse or partner present. About 18.3% of all households were made up of individuals and 6.3% had someone living alone who was 65 years of age or older.

There were 2,449 housing units, of which 12.7% were vacant. The homeowner vacancy rate was 4.5% and the rental vacancy rate was 17.8%.

Racial composition as of the 2020 census
Race	Number	Percent
White	5,425	80.4%
Black or African American	6	0.1%
American Indian and Alaska Native	520	7.7%
Asian	43	0.6%
Native Hawaiian and Other Pacific Islander	24	0.4%
Some other race	300	4.4%
Two or more races	429	6.4%
Hispanic or Latino (of any race)	675	10.0%

=== 2000 census ===
As of the census of 2000, there were 4,299 people, 1,380 households, and 1,095 families residing in the city. The population density was 818.6 people per square mile (316.2/km^{2}). There were 1,566 housing units at an average density of 298.2 per square mile (115.2/km^{2}). The racial makeup of the city was 86.58% White American, 0.19% Black or African American, 8.14% Native American, 0.21% Asian American, none Pacific Islander American, 1.74% from other races, and 3.14% from two or more races. Hispanic or Latino of any race were 3.88% of the population.

There were 1,380 households, out of which 51.0% had children under the age of 18 living with them, 60.8% were married couples living together, 14.2% had a female householder with no husband present, and 20.6% were non-families. 16.7% of all households were made up of individuals, and 5.9% had someone living alone who was 65 years of age or older. The average household size was 3.12 and the average family size was 3.51.

In the city, the population was spread out, with 39.5% under the age of 18, 10.7% from 18 to 24, 25.4% from 25 to 44, 16.1% from 45 to 64, and 8.3% who were 65 years of age or older. The median age was 25 years. For every 100 females, there were 94.0 males. For every 100 females age 18 and over, there were 88.4 males.

The median income for a household in the city was $29,190, and the median income for a family was $32,328. Males had a median income of $32,117 versus $18,043 for females. The per capita income for the city was $11,945. About 19.2% of families and 22.1% of the population were below the poverty line, including 26.7% of those under age 18 and 10.1% of those age 65 or over.

=== 2015 ===
As of 2015 the largest self-reported ancestry groups in Roosevelt, Utah are:

Largest ancestries (2015)	Percent
English (England)	25.0%
American (United States)	8.9%
German (Germany)	7.2%
Irish (Republic of Ireland)	5.1%
Danish (Denmark)	4.4%
Scottish (Scotland)	3.5%
Swedish (Sweden)	2.5%
Italian (Italy)	2.2%
Norwegian (Norway)	1.4%
Welsh (Wales)	0.9%

== History ==
In 1905, by an act of Congress, the unallotted land of the Ute Indian Reservation was opened to homesteading. Several thousand hopeful 20th-century pioneers congregated in Provo and Grand Junction with the hope of successfully drawing lots for a homestead in a fertile region of the soon-to-be-opened lands. Throughout the fall and winter of 1905–06, the settlers came to the Uinta Basin.

The town of Roosevelt was founded in early 1906 when Ed Harmston turned his homestead claim into a townsite and laid out plots. His wife named the prospective town in honor of the president of the United States, Theodore Roosevelt. Roosevelt was originally called Dry Gulch City, taking its name from a nearby gulch that only carries water during the early spring runoff season. Within a short time a store, a post office, and the Dry Gulch Irrigation Company were in business in the new town. In 1907, the Harmstons donated 2 acres (8,100 m^{2}) of ground for the town's citizens to build a school. The first class had about fifteen pupils, who had to provide books from their homes. Roosevelt soon became the economic center for the area, eclipsing Myton and Duchesne.

Roosevelt is situated on U.S. Route 40 in the northeast corner of the state, south of the Uinta Mountains, at an elevation of 5,250 feet (1,600 m). The town was incorporated at a mass meeting of 44 citizens on 21 February 1913. From 1906 to 1914 Roosevelt was in Wasatch County, but in 1914 Duchesne County was formed from part of Wasatch County, and, as the largest town in the county, Roosevelt anticipated becoming the county seat. However, when the total county-wide vote came in, the seat went to Duchesne.

== Economy ==
The population of Roosevelt is approximately 6,700 people, but the town serves as the business center for several times that number from the many small towns and farming communities in the area.

Roosevelt is located in an area of vast oil reserves spanning the northeast corner of Utah and extending into western Colorado. The town "booms" whenever oil prices go up and falls on harder times when oil prices decrease. The proposed Uinta Basin Rail project would build a new railroad line into Roosevelt for transporting oil drilled in the area.

The city used to have an oil refinery, "Plateau", named for the geographic location of the area, the Colorado Plateau. The oil from this area is known as "Uinta Basin Black Wax Crude" and has to be refined differently than most types of oil. Those in the oil business and land owners who profit from oil shares indicated during the high oil prices of 2005–2006 that refineries were cutting their profits by limiting the amount of Uinta Basin Black Wax they would refine.

Various types of farming, including beef cattle, sheep, pigs, horses, honey and hay, are prevalent in the outlying areas around town.

Roosevelt is also home of the only hospital in the county, Uintah Basin Medical Center.

== Education ==
It is within the Duchesne County School District.

Roosevelt has become the county's educational center with Union High School, Uintah Basin Technical College, and Utah State University's Uintah Basin Regional Campus all located there. Union High School is on the east end of town and straddled the border between Duchesne and Uintah Counties, thus the name "Union".

Union High School was then partially demolished in favor of a newly built school; still named Union, but located on a road just behind the old school and a little further west. It was still on the east end of town but not crossing the border how it was. This new school was necessary as the old one could barely accommodate all of the students and was unlikely to have enough space for the next generations to come.

Roosevelt is part of the Duchesne School District. Other schools in the area include: Eagle View Elementary (Public/K-8), East Elementary School (Public/K-5), Kings Peak Elementary (Public/K-5), Centennial Elementary (Public/K-5), Roosevelt Junior High School (Public/6-8), and Thompsen School (Public/3-12).

== Religion and local culture ==
The Church of Jesus Christ of Latter-day Saints is the dominant religious denomination in Roosevelt, with three stake centers in town; the community also includes Roman Catholic, Christian Assembly of God, Baptist, Jehovah's Witnesses, and other smaller denomination congregations.

Located near the Uintah/Ouray Indian Reservation headquarters of Fort Duchesne, Roosevelt is a multicultural and polyethnic community, with Caucasians and Native Americans being the most numerous. Roosevelt is situated in lands designated as the Uintah and Ouray Indian Reservation and there are many Pow-Wows and Indian Ceremonies held throughout the summer and fall months.

The UBIC (Uintah Basin in Celebration) is Roosevelt's annual celebration. What started in the early part of the century as a yearly display of the latest in farming and industrial technology has developed into a yearly gala complete with parade, talent show, concerts, and dances.

== Notable people ==
- Reed Cowan, Emmy-winning news anchor, film-maker and philanthropist
- Laraine Day, actress
- Colby Jenkins, politician
- Marlon O. Snow, politician

== See also ==
- High Uintas Wilderness
