= Utah State University-Brigham City =

Coordinates: 41°29′08″N 112°01′08″W

USU Brigham City
- Type: Public
- Established: 1984
- Parent institution: Utah State University
- Location: Brigham City, Utah, U.S.
- Campus: Statewide Campus
- Website: statewide.usu.edu/brighamcity/

Utah State University Brigham City is part of the Utah State University Statewide Campuses located in Brigham City, Utah. As part of USU’s statewide system, USU Brigham City offers more than 30 bachelor’s degrees, 26 master’s and three doctorates, as well as a variety of certificate, licensure, and endorsement programs.

== History ==
USU Brigham City opened in the Box Elder County Courthouse in 1984. In 1991, the campus moved to a store-front in an abandoned strip mall. After undergoing several renovations and expansions, the 120,000-square-foot (11,000 m2) Milton P. Miller building now offers a bookstore, child care center, laboratories, computer lab, classrooms, and student lounge. In December 2010, the Utah State Board of Regents approved the purchase of property to expand the campus. Since an additional 40-acres of the former, dilapidated, Intermountain Indian School have been acquired.

In 2021, USU announced official land acknowledgments for each campus, including Brigham City’s, which reads: “We recognize Utah State University Brigham City resides on the ancestral, traditional, and contemporary lands of the Northwestern Band of the Shoshone Nation. In offering this land acknowledgment, we affirm Indigenous sovereignty, history, and experiences.”

== Delivery ==
As a USU Statewide Campus, there are four options for course delivery:

Online

Students take courses online at their own pace during the traditional semester schedule. Assignments, discussion, and other communication take place online. Classes do not meet on a regular basis. Bachelor's degrees available online include agribusiness, family life studies, and psychology. Master's Degrees available online include English and instructional technology.

Hybrid

Courses are delivered online, but students are usually required to participate in-person at set times. This allows for streaming video and live chat with other students and the instructor in real-time. Hybrid bachelor's degrees available include Elementary Education and Family, Consumer, & Human Development. Hybrid master's degrees include Engineering and Rehabilitation Counseling.

Broadcast

Interactive Video Conferencing (IVC) courses are interactive classes taught in a classroom and broadcast to various locations throughout the state of Utah. Additional classrooms are able to watch video in real-time of the instructor as they teach. Through microphones and camera systems, students in remote sites are able to ask and answer questions and make comments that the instructor is able to answer for all students. Most degrees available on USU’s Statewide Campuses are taught using IVC.

Face-to-Face

These are in-person, traditional higher education courses. Students attend classes and are taught by instructors face-to-face.
