= Utah State University–Tooele =

Public university in Tooele, Utah, United States

Coordinates: 40°31′48″N 112°19′29″W

Utah State University Tooele
- Type: Public
- Parent institution: Utah State University
- Director: Jennifer Van Cott
- Location: Tooele, Utah, U.S.
- Campus: Regional Campus
- Website: tooele.usu.edu

Utah State University Tooele is a part of the Utah State University Statewide Campuses located in Tooele, Utah offering a number of Associate, bachelor's and master's degrees as well as certificate programs and a Doctor of Education program. Classes are taught online, face-to-face, and interactive broadcast. USU Tooele has 10 full-time faculty members in addition to the several adjunct professors who collectively teach more than 300 classes. The campus provides academic advising and free tutoring.

== Recent growth ==
USU Tooele recently opened the doors to a new Science & Technology building on campus. The building is part of USU's ongoing mission to enhance and increase access to higher education throughout the state. It contains a chemistry lab, biology lab, zoology lab, cadaver lab, physiology lab, three multi-purpose rooms, a conference room, and various Interactive Video Conference (IVC) classrooms, allowing classes to be taught both in-person and online for additional flexibility.

== Delivery ==
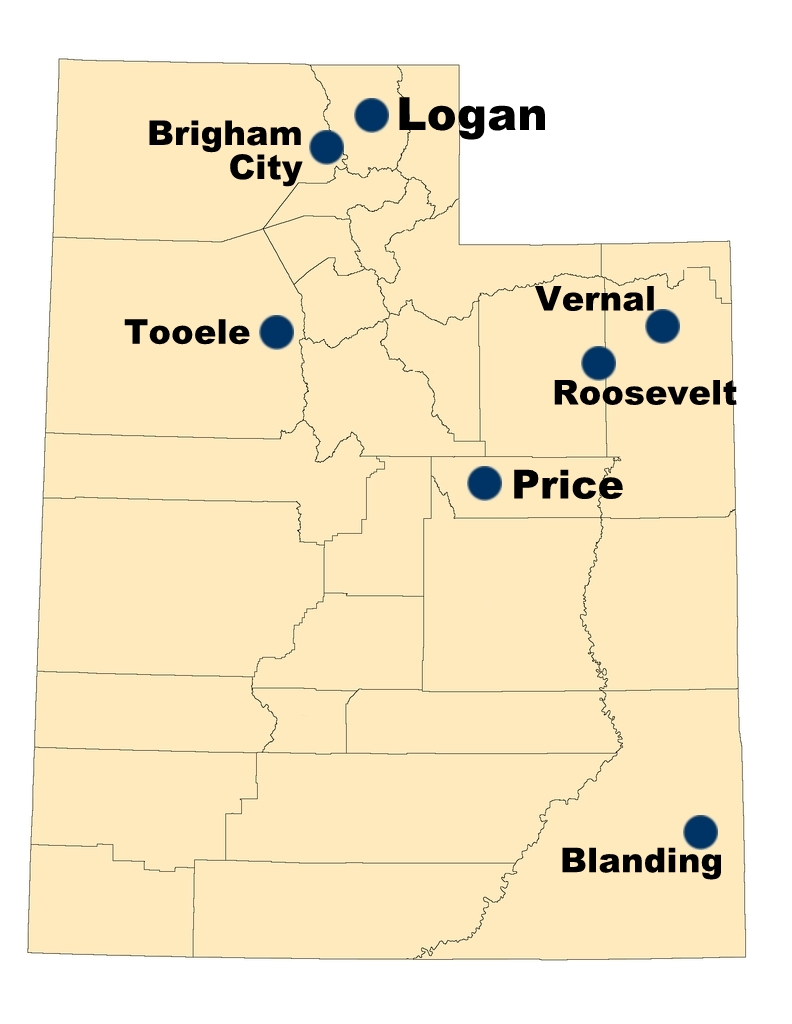
USU has 6 regional campuses and more than 20 distance education centers throughout Utah

As a Regional Campus within the USU System, there are four options for course delivery:

=== Online ===
Students take courses online at their own pace during the traditional semester schedule. Assignments, discussion, and other communication take place online. Classes do not meet on a regular basis. Bachelor's degrees available online include agribusiness, family life studies, and psychology. Master's Degrees available online include English and instructional technology.

=== Hybrid ===
Courses are delivered in an online format using online video communication software such as Adobe Connect (Breeze) or Wimba. While the courses are delivered online students are usually required to participate in hybrid classes at set times. This allows for streaming video and live chat with other students and the instructor in real-time. Hybrid bachelor's degrees available include Elementary Education and Family, Consumer, & Human Development. Hybrid master's degrees include Engineering and Rehabilitation Counseling.

=== Interactive Video Conferencing (IVC) ===
IVC courses are interactive classes taught in a classroom and broadcast to various locations throughout the state of Utah. Additional classrooms are able to watch video in real-time of the instructor as he or she teaches. Through microphones and camera systems, students in remote sites are able to ask and answer questions and make comments that the instructor is able to answer for all students. Most degrees available through RCDE are taught using IVC.

=== Face-to-Face ===
These are in-class, traditional higher education courses. Students attend classes and are taught by instructors in person.

Tooele Student Enrollment by Delivery Method (Note: Duplicate headcount exists among delivery methods)
| Delivery Method | Enrollment |
|---|---|
| Online | 341(22%) |
| Face-To-Face | 596(53%) |
| IVC | 403(25%) |
