= Council on Occupational Education =

National accrediting agency in U.S

The Council on Occupational Education (COE) is a national accrediting agency of higher education institutions recognized by the U.S. Department of Education. COE was created in 1971 as part of the Southern Association of Colleges and Schools. The COE became independent in 1995.

As of 2013, the Council on Occupational Education accredits non-degree-granting and applied associate degree-granting post-secondary career and technical education institutions.

The Council on Occupational Education Headquarters is located in Atlanta, Georgia.

As of 2026, the agency is led by Dr. Kirk Nooks, their President and Chief Executive Officer.
