= Uinta =

Uinta or Uintah /juːˈɪntə/, which derives from the Ute word Yoov-we-teuh, meaning "pine forest" or "pine tree", may refer to:

== Geological features ==
All in the United States

- Uinta Basin, in eastern Utah
- Uinta Formation, in northeastern Utah
- Uinta Mountains, also referred to as "the Uintas", in northeastern Utah with some parts in Colorado and Wyoming
- Uinta River, in Duchesne County and Uintah County, Utah
- Uintah Lake, in Duchesne County, Utah

== Organisms ==
- Aphaenogaster uinta, a species of ant
- Uinta (moth), a genus of moths
- Uinta chipmunk, a species of chipmunk, in the family Sciuridae

== Parks and reserves ==
All in the United States

- High Uintas Wilderness, in northeastern Utah
- Uinta National Forest, in north central Utah
- Uintah and Ouray Indian Reservation, in northeastern Utah

== Populated places ==
All in the United States

- Uinta County, Wyoming, in the south-west corner of the state
- Uintah, Utah, a city in Weber County
- Uintah County, Utah, on the eastern side of the state

== Other uses ==
- Uinta Brewing Company, a craft brewery located in Salt Lake City, Utah, U.S.
- Ute Indian Tribe of the Uintah and Ouray Reservation, a federally recognized tribe in northeastern Utah, U.S.
  - Uintah tribe, a tribe of multiple bands of Utes
- Uinta Basin Rail, a proposed shale oil extraction railway in Utah
- Uintah Railway, a former narrow-gauge railroad in Utah and Colorado
