= Utah State Route 45 =

State highway in Utah, United States

State Route 45

Route information
- Maintained by UDOT
- Length: 40.028 mi (64.419 km)
- Existed: 1925 as a state highway; 1927 as SR-45–present

Major junctions
- South end: Dragon Road near Bonanza
- North end: US 40 in Naples

Location
- Country: United States
- State: Utah

Highway system
- Utah State Highway System; Interstate; US; State; Minor; Scenic
← SR-44	→ SR-46

State Route 45 (SR-45) is a state highway in the U.S. state of Utah. It runs from Dragon Road south of Bonanza in Uintah County north to US-40 in Naples, south of Vernal. The route spans 40.03 miles (64.42 km) south–north.

The route was added to the state highway system in 1925 and numbered in 1927, originally running from US-40 southeast to the Colorado state line. Subsequently, the highway was moved to a new road in 1943, truncated to Bonanza in 1968, and again moved and extended in 1982.

== Route description ==
The route begins at the intersection of Dragon Road south of Bonanza as a two-lane undivided road. From there, it heads north-northwest and passes through Bonanza. Past the settlement, the route goes in a northwest direction for the rest of its path and enters in Naples as 1500 East, where it terminates at US-40.

== History ==
The road now known as Snake John Reef Road, running southeast from SR-6 (US-40) to the state line, was added to the state highway system in 1925 and numbered SR-45 in 1927. Across the state line, this connected with the original alignment of State Highway 64. In 1943, the route was shifted west, now following Old Bonanza Highway from US-40 south to Bonanza. An extension south to the state line via Dragon was added in 1945, with an unnumbered unimproved road (briefly State Highway 395) continuing over Baxter Pass to US 50 near Mack, Colorado. The same year, State Route 207 was created as a short spur, now Bitter Creek Road, to Rainbow. The State Road Commission removed these 1945 additions from the state highway system in 1968, cutting SR-45 back to Bonanza.

The commission proposed in 1957, and the legislature approved in 1961, the creation of State Route 264 from the Red Wash Oil Field north to US-40 at Jensen. However, the road was given back to Uintah County in 1969. Subsequently, the county constructed and improved two roads, one running southeast from US-40 near Naples to former SR-264, and the other continuing from old SR-264 west of the oil field to SR-45. Both of these became part of SR-45 in 1982, when that route was moved farther west, keeping only a short piece of the 1943 alignment near Bonanza. It was simultaneously extended back south from Bonanza, across the White River, to its present terminus near the White River Mine (oil shale).

== Major intersections ==
The entire route is in Uintah County.

Location	mi	km	Destinations	Notes
	0.000	0.000	Dragon Road	Southern terminus
Naples	40.028	64.419	US 40 (Dinosaur Diamond Scenic Byway) – Vernal	Northern terminus
1.000 mi = 1.609 km; 1.000 km = 0.621 mi
