= Atchee, Colorado =

Ghost town in Colorado, US

- Ghost town
- Location of Atchee, Colorado. Atchee (Colorado)
- Coordinates: 39°33′47″N 108°54′46″W
- Country: United States
- State: Colorado
- County: Garfield
- Elevation: 6,418 ft (1,956 m)
- Time zone: UTC−07:00 (MST)
  - Summer (DST): UTC−06:00 (MDT)
- GNIS pop ID: 172111

Atchee is a ghost town in Garfield County, Colorado. It was originally a railroad village/company town owned by the Gilsonite Company that served as a shopping town on the narrow-gauge Uintah Railway. The railroad served mines in nearby Utah. At a point in time, the railroad was dismantled which led to a sharp population decline. By 1938, there were only 27 voters in the town and by 1940 only two voters remained.

== History ==
The Atchee, Colorado, post office operated from September 26, 1905, until April 30, 1940. The town was a company town and thus almost everyone in the town worked for the Gilsonite Company. The houses all had running water and steam heat as well as being served by electricity. Atchee was never an incorporated town. The town was named after a Ute chief.

=== Rail line ===
The rail line was the lifeblood of the town, with the town's population sharply declining and eventually falling into ghost town status after the demolition of the rail line. The line itself ran from Mack, Colorado, to Watson, Utah, with a spur to the Rainbow Mine in Utah from Watson. During the summer, there were special trains run for students of the Colorado School of Mines.

== See also ==
- List of ghost towns in Colorado
- Rifle, CO Micropolitan Statistical Area
