= Uintah Railway =

Railroad in the United States

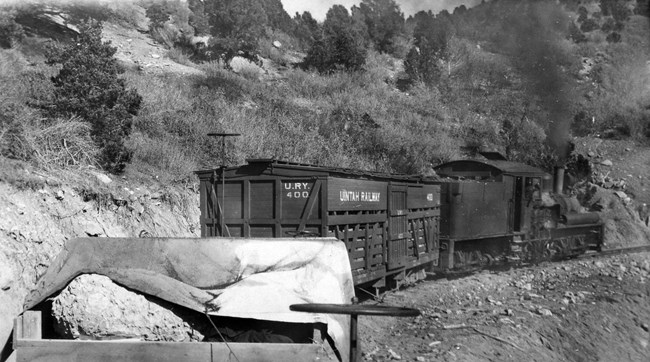
- Uintah Railway primarily hauled Gilsonite, but here dinosaur bones peek out from under a tarp enroute to Mack, Colorado for shipment to the Carnegie Museum of Natural History

Overview
- Headquarters: Mack, Colorado
- Locale: Book Cliffs - Uintah Basin
- Dates of operation: 1904–1939

Technical
- Track gauge: 3 ft (914 mm)

The Uintah Railway was a small 3 ft (914 mm) narrow gauge railroad company in Utah and Colorado in the United States. It was constructed to carry Gilsonite which provided most of its operating revenues; but it operated as a common carrier from 1904 to 1939, also carrying passengers, mail, express, and other cargoes including sheep and wool. When a public library was built in Dragon in 1910, the Uintah Railway agreed to deliver library books free of charge to and from any borrower along its route. Many area ranchers and miners took advantage of the opportunity.

== Background ==
The Uintah Basin includes seams of asphaltum remaining where petroleum from the Green River Formation oil shales seeped into fissures in the overlying sandstone where smaller hydrocarbon molecules were slowly evaporated or digested by aerobic microbes. The remaining large-molecular-weight hydrocarbons formed a lustrous black solid at ambient temperatures, resembling anthracite coal with a brownish dust. Following ignition, the heat generated by combustion causes the burning asphaltum to melt and flow. European Americans began mining this asphaltum in the 1860s, but attempts to burn it in conventional coal stoves were unsuccessful. The asphaltum was named Gilsonite after Samuel Henry Gilson began using the material in 1886 as a varnish and as electrical insulation. Gilson built a manufacturing plant in Salt Lake City, and began mining operations in 1888. The plant was purchased by a group of Missouri businessmen who formed the Gilsonite Asphaltum Company. For more than a decade, Gilsonite was hauled from the mines in horse-drawn wagons to be loaded aboard railway cars at Price, Utah. The wagons took ten or eleven days to make a round trip and the hauling costs encouraged construction of a railroad.

== History ==
The railway company was founded in 1903 as a wholly owned subsidiary of the Gilson Asphaltum Company. Construction began at a connection with the Denver and Rio Grande Western Railroad at what became known as Mack, Colorado. Twenty-eight miles of track was laid following West Salt Wash Creek upstream to the company town of Atchee, Colorado, named after a chief of the Ute people. Atchee served as a division point with maintenance shops for railway equipment. From Atchee, six miles of 7.5 percent grade were required to climb the Book Cliffs to Baxter Pass at an elevation of 8,437 feet (2,572 m). From the summit of Baxter Pass, there were seven miles of 5 percent downhill grade to Wendella, Colorado, followed by twelve miles of 3 percent or shallower grades down Evacuation Creek to the Black Dragon Mine just west of the Utah border. The Black Dragon Vein of Gilsonite was exposed across the ground surface for a distance of 4 miles (6.4 km), and averaged 6 feet (1.8 m) wide for half of that distance. Trains began hauling Gilsonite from the Black Dragon Mine in October, 1904. Shay locomotives pulled freight trains over Baxter Pass between the Dragon Mine and Atchee, and 2-8-0 engines pulled the freight trains between Atchee and Mack.

Ten miles of track were laid in 1911 on a one percent grade down Evacuation Creek from Dragon, Utah, to the Rainbow Mine near Watson, Utah. A new 2-8-2 locomotive was built to pull freight trains between Watson and Wendella. The new locomotive was more efficient than Shay locomotives on that section of track, but it could not negotiate the steep grades and sharp curves over Baxter Pass between Wendella and Atchee. The railroad had operated passenger trains since 1905 consisting of a 0-6-2 tank locomotive pulling a single combine car between Mack and Dragon or Watson. This passenger train service was discontinued in 1921.

For much of the 1920s the Uintah was headed by Lucian Sprague, a railroad executive who later became well known for orchestrating the dramatic turnaround of the bankrupt Minneapolis and St. Louis Railway. In 1926 the railroad purchased an articulated locomotive, #50, which was specifically designed to handle the extreme curvature and steep grades of Baxter Pass. The idea was that this new locomotive would do away with the need to change engines at Atchee and Wendella. The single articulated locomotive could move as many cars as two Shay locomotives from Rainbow to Atchee and made the trip in half the time. After some initial modifications, this engine proved to be such a success that in 1928 the railroad purchased a sister locomotive, #51. These were the only narrow gauge compounded articulated locomotives sold for use in the United States.

Through a bureaucratic loophole, the USPS charged in-state rates for shipping between the basin and Salt Lake City, assuming a straight line distance, despite them using the Uintah Railway, and having to route the mail to Colorado first and then back into Utah. This meant it was significantly cheaper to ship by mail than pay the railroad directly. A number of businesses soon discovered this loophole, and when the builders of a bank in the town of Vernal learned this, they shipped 30 tons of bricks, one at a time, by mail. This nearly bankrupted the Utah division of the postal service, forcing them adjust the shipping zone boundaries to match the geographical isolation of the Uinta Basin from the rest of Utah.

The railroad lasted until 1939 when trucks took over hauling the Gilsonite. At that time, the rails were pulled up and the towns abandoned. Most of the railway's locomotives were scrapped immediately; the two famous articulateds were sold to the Sumpter Valley Railway in Oregon and later went to Guatemala, where they were dismantled. Today all that remains of the Uintah are the cellar pits of some of the buildings, the shell of the machine shop in Atchee, a few pieces of rolling stock and part of the company hotel in Mack.

== Route ==
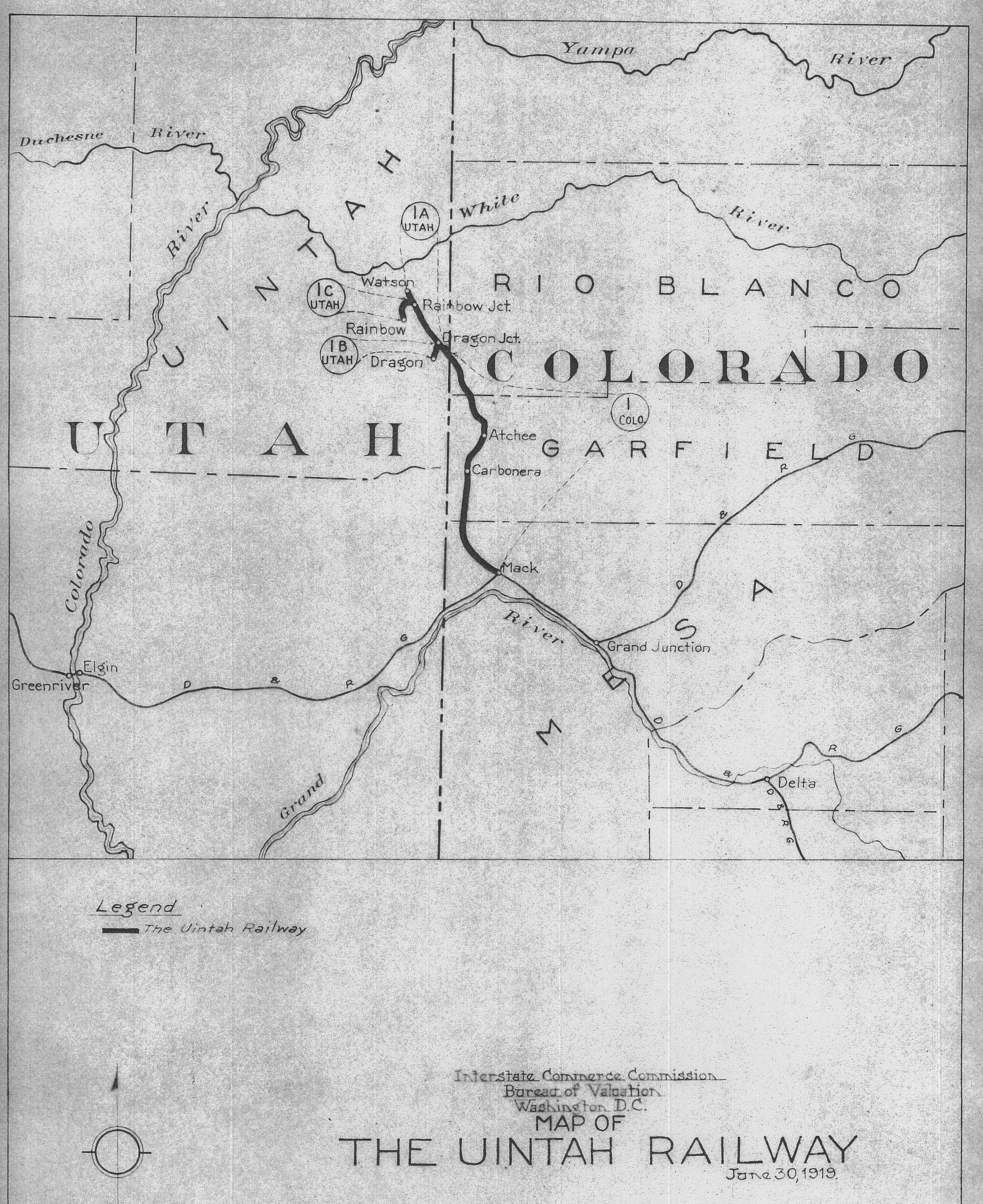
1919 map of the railroad

- Milepost 0 - Mack, Colorado (D&RGW interchange with water tank and turning wye)
- Milepost 4.2 - Clarkton (11 car spur)
- Milepost 11.5 - Sprague (12 car siding)
- Milepost 20.1 - Carbonera, Colorado (company coal mine)
- Milepost 28.3 - Atchee, Colorado (coal shed, water tank, company shops and turning wye)
- Milepost 30.1 - Moro Castle (66° horseshoe curve)
- Milepost 32.2 - Shale (horseshoe curve, water tank and 5 car spur)
- Milepost 34.2 - Baxter Pass summit (turning wye and 17 car siding)
- Milepost 36.1 - Deer Run (6 car spur & coal shed)
- Milepost 37.4 - Columbine (horseshoe curve with balloon return loop and water tank)
- Milepost 39.0 - Hairpin curve
- Milepost 39.4 - Muleshoe curve
- Milepost 39.9 - McAndrews (9 car siding and dam creating Lake McAndrews for Wendella water tank)
- Milepost 40.9 - Wendella (water tank and turning wye)
- Milepost 42.1 - Sewall (15 car spur)
- Milepost 46.6 - East Vac (9 car spur)
- Milepost 48.0 - Urado (2 car spur)
- Milepost 50.8 - Colorado/Utah state line
- Milepost 53.3 - Dragon, Utah (Gilsonite mine with coal shed, water tank and turning wye)
- Milepost 54.6 - Country Boy (7 car spur)
- Milepost 55.7 - Rector (7 car spur)
- Milepost 58.6 - Ute (6 car spur)
- Milepost 62.1 - Rainbow Junction, Utah (Gilsonite mine)
- Milepost 62.8 - Watson, Utah (water tank and turning wye)

== Locomotives ==
Photo	Number	Builder	Type	Date	Works number	Notes
	1	Lima Locomotive Works	2-truck Shay locomotive	5/1904	888	Scrapped 1928
	2	Lima Locomotive Works	2-truck Shay locomotive	10/1904	939	Scrapped about 1935
	3	Lima Locomotive Works	2-truck Shay locomotive	4/1905	1513	Scrapped 1933
	4	Lima Locomotive Works	2-truck Shay locomotive	11/1905	1575	Built as Waldorf Mining & Milling #2, then Argentine Central Railway #2, purchased in 1910; scrapped 1928
	5	Lima Locomotive Works	2-truck Shay locomotive	6/1906	1674	Formerly Argentine Central Railway #3, purchased 1910, reboilered 1930, scrapped 1939
	6	Lima Locomotive Works	2-truck Shay locomotive	2/1920	3054	Sold 1927 to Feather River Lumber Company #3
	7	Uintah Railway Atchee shops	2-truck Shay locomotive	12/1933		Assembled from spare parts from #1, #3, & #4 with new Lima boiler; scrapped 1939
	10	Baldwin Locomotive Works	2-8-0	5/1904	24271	Sold 1927 to Eureka Nevada Railway 2nd #10
	1st #11	Baldwin Locomotive Works	2-8-0	3/1880	5011	Built as Denver and Rio Grande #55; purchased 5/1904; scrapped 1911
	2nd #11	Baldwin Locomotive Works	2-8-0	2/1911	36093	Scrapped 1927
	12	Baldwin Locomotive Works	2-8-0	3/1896	14771	Built as Florence and Cripple Creek Railroad #10; then Cripple Creek and Colorado #36; purchased 8/1917; reboilered 1924; sold 1937 to Eureka Nevada Railway 2nd #12; on static display at the Nevada Southern Railroad Museum
	20	Baldwin Locomotive Works	0-6-2T	6/1905	25896	Scrapped 1939
	21	Baldwin Locomotive Works	0-6-2T	1905	25953	Scrapped 1939
	30	Baldwin Locomotive Works	2-8-2	9/1911	36908	Scrapped 1939
	40	Baldwin Locomotive Works	2-8-2	9/1913	40953	Built as New York and Bermudez Railroad #10; purchased 6/1919; scrapped 1939
	50	Baldwin Locomotive Works	2-6-6-2T	6/1926	59261	Sold 1940 to Sumpter Valley Railway #250
	51	Baldwin Locomotive Works	2-6-6-2T	4/1928	60470	Sold 1940 to Sumpter Valley Railway #251
	52	Railcar	1-B			

== Bibliography ==
- Bender, Henry E. (1995). Uintah Railway: The Gilsonite Route. Forest Park, Illinois: Heimburger House Publishing Co. ISBN 0-911581-36-7.
- Polley, Rodger (1999). Uintah Railway Pictorial - Volume I. Denver, Colorado: Sundance Publications, Ltd. ISBN 0-913582-68-9.
- Polley, Rodger (2002). Uintah Railway Pictorial - Volume II. Denver, Colorado: Sundance Publications, Ltd. ISBN 0-913582-73-5.
- Carr, Stephen L. (1986) [June 1972]. The Historical Guide to Utah Ghost Towns (3rd ed.). Salt Lake City, Utah: Western Epics. pp. 64–65. ISBN 0-914740-30-X.
- Carr, stephen L (1989). "Uintah Railway". Utah Ghost Rails. Western Epics. pp. 196–199. ISBN 0914740342.

== See also ==
- Uinta Basin Rail modern proposal for a rail line to the Uinta Basin
