= Neola North Fire =

2007 wildfire in Utah, United States

- The Neola North fire raging in the Uinta Mountains north of Neola, July 3rd, 2007.
- Date: June 29, 2007 -
- Location: Ashley National Forest, Utah
- Coordinates: 40.5°N 110.0°W

Statistics
- Total area: 43,511 acres (176.08 km^{2})

Impacts
- Deaths: 3
- Structures lost: At Least 12

Ignition
- Cause: Under Investigation

Map
- Location within Utah

The Neola North Fire was a major wildfire which occurred in the Ashley National Forest in northeastern Utah. It was blamed for three fatalities, the destruction of at least 12 homes, the burning of 43,511 acres (176 km^{2}) of land, and led to the evacuation of about 500 local residents.

At its peak the wildfire was fought by more than 700 firefighters, and gained extensive media attention in the United States and limited attention internationally.

== Outbreak ==
The fire broke out on Friday, June 29, 2007, at around 9:00 a.m. local time in Duchesne County, north of the unincorporated community of Neola. The source of the fire was Ute tribal land next to state route 121. It proceeded to spread eastward into Uintah County, and threatened the small communities of Whiterocks, Farm Creek, and Paradise.

One branch of the fire was prevented from spreading westwards before it reached Dry Creek Canyon and the town of Tridell. Another branch spread north into the Uintah mountains via Uintah Canyon, in land devoid of residential homes.

== Cause ==
The cause of the wildfire is currently under investigation. An early report by public safety officials claimed, it was caused by a faulty power line or transformer. However, a later announcement by Moon Lake Electric Association CEO Grant Earl disputed this.

Witnesses later came forward to state they had seen the nebulous wildfire as they traveled along State Route 121. But having taken photos of the early fire and offered assistance to contain it they were refused access to the land by a Ute tribal member.

As of July 11, 2007, the investigation into the cause of the wildfire was being conducted by the Federal Bureau of Investigation, the Bureau of Indian Affairs, and the U.S. Forest Service.
