= Cedarview =

Cedarview or Cedar View may refer to:

== Places ==
=== United States ===
- Cedarview, Utah, a ghost town in Duchesne County
- Cedar View, Virginia, an unincorporated community in Accomack County

=== Canada ===
- Cedarview, Ontario, a community in Lambton County, Ontario
- Cedarview Middle School, Ottawa, Ontario
- Cedarview Road, Ottawa, Ontario

== Other uses ==
- Cedarview (microprocessor)
