= Silopi asphaltite mine =

Asphaltite Mine in Turkey

Silopi Asphaltite Mine
- Location: Şırnak Province, Turkey
- Products: Asphaltite
- Company: Ciner Group

Silopi Asphaltite Mine is an asphaltite mine located in Şırnak Province in Turkey which supplies fuel for Şırnak Silopi power station.
