= Lake Uinta =

Lake Uinta can refer to:

- Lake Uinta (paleolake), an Eocene paleolake within the Green River Formation of Colorado, Utah, and Wyoming
- Uintah Lake, a modern lake in Utah
