= Watson, Utah =

Ghost town in Utah

Watson
- Ghost town
- Location within Utah Location within the United States
- Coordinates: 39°52′54.8″N 109°09′30.6″W
- Country: United States
- State: Utah
- County: Uintah
- Established: 19 November 1911
- Abandoned: c. 1939
- Named for: Wallace G. Watson
- Elevation: 5,377 ft (1,639 m)

Watson is a ghost town in Uintah County, at the extreme eastern edge of Utah, United States. Watson was founded on 19 November 1911, when an extension to the Uintah Railway moved the terminus of the line to Watson from Dragon.

== Geography ==
Watson is located south of the White River along Evacuation Creek, just North of the ghost town Dragon and the Black Dragon Gilsonite mine. The present-day center of Gilsonite mining, Bonanza, is about 20 miles (32 km) to the north of Watson.

== History ==
The Town was named after Wallace G. Watson, the Civil Engineer who designed the Uintah Railroad that ran from Dragon to Watson along Evacuation Creek. The town was made up of a rail depot, a few houses, a hotel, a post office, a school, a telephone office, and a warehouse. Without a railway north into Vernal, sending items through the mail was often cheaper, so many items came through the post office. The town once had around 750 people living there. The Hotel, named the Watson Hotel was owned by the Railway company.

== Notable people ==
- Wallace G. Watson
