= Cedarview, Utah =

Ghost town in Duchesne County, Utah, United States

- Ghost Town
- Location within Utah Location within the United States
- Coordinates: 40°21′37″N 110°2′35″W
- Country: United States
- State: Utah
- County: Duchesne County, Utah
- Established: 1912
- Elevation: 5,459 ft (1,664 m)
- Time zone: Central (CST)
  - Summer (DST): CDT
- Area code: Area code
- GNIS feature ID: 1437520

Cedarview is a ghost town in eastern Duchesne County, Utah, United States,

== Description ==
The former community is located just off (west) of Utah State Route 121, about midway between Roosevelt and Neola. There is a cemetery in the former community, that operated until 1936; many babies who died of pneumonia are buried there. A few locals from nearby towns are preserving the cemetery from natural threats like erosion.

== History ==
Cedarview was founded in 1912 when travelers needed a rest stop during a snowstorm. The town was short-lived and never got a post office.

== See also ==
- List of ghost towns in Utah
