= Lapoint, Utah =

Unincorporated community in the state of Utah, United States

- Unincorporated community
- Location of Lapoint within the State of Utah Lapoint (the United States)
- Coordinates: 40°24′14″N 109°47′37″W
- Country: United States
- State: Utah
- County: Uintah
- Named for: Southward "point" of the Uinta Mountains
- Elevation: 5,568 ft (1,697 m)

Population (2020)
  - Total: 170
- Time zone: UTC-7 (Mountain (MST))
  - Summer (DST): UTC-6 (MDT)
- ZIP codes: 84039
- GNIS feature ID: 1429476

Lapoint is an unincorporated community in western Uintah County, Utah, United States. As a census-designated place, the population was 170 at the 2020 census.

== Description ==
Historical population
Census	Pop.	Note	%±
1930	579		—
1940	646		11.6%
1950	496		−23.2%
2020	170		—
Source: U.S. Census Bureau

The community lies along State Route 121, just inside the Uintah and Ouray Indian Reservation, and west of the city of Vernal (the county seat of Uintah County). Deep Creek, a tributary of the Uinta River flow southwest through Lapoint. The community's elevation is 5,568 feet (1,697 m). Although Lapoint is unincorporated, it has a post office, with the ZIP code of 84039.

Originally named Taft in honor of William Howard Taft, its name was changed to Lapoint since it lies on a southward-jutting spur or "point" of the Uinta Mountains.

== Climate ==
According to the Köppen Climate Classification system, Lapoint has a semi-arid climate, abbreviated "BSk" on climate maps.

== Notable people ==
- Lane Frost (1963-1989), world champion professional rodeo bull rider, hall of fame inductee
- Shawn Bradley Shawn Paul Bradley is a German-American former professional basketball player who played center for the Philadelphia 76ers, New Jersey Nets and Dallas Mavericks of the National Basketball Association

== Archaeology ==
Lapoint was settled on top of a significant Fremont archaeological site known as "Caldwell Village", after the property on which it was found, excavated in 1966 by John Richard Ambler. The site comprised "22 pithouses, nine pits, seven borrow pits, two isolated hearths, nine human burials, two dog burials, and an irrigation ditch," with artifacts including "over 5,000 pottery sherds, 14 restorable vessels, several thousand ground and chipped stone artifacts, over 400 bone, antler and shell artifacts and a few perishable artifacts." A radiocarbon date of 520 AD +/- 70 years was documented from a charred roof timber at one site, however, dating of the pottery traditions suggests an occupation period of 1050 - 1200 AD. The surface of the site was almost entirely destroyed by agricultural plowing and today there are no extant remains visible.
