= Utah State Route 121 =

State highway in Utah, United States

State Route 121

Route information
- Maintained by UDOT
- Length: 40.293 mi (64.845 km)
- Existed: 1931–present

Major junctions
- West end: US 40 / US 191 in Roosevelt
- East end: US 40 / US 191 in Vernal

Location
- Country: United States
- State: Utah

Highway system
- Utah State Highway System; Interstate; US; State; Minor; Scenic
← SR-120	→ SR-122

State Route 121 (SR-121) is a state highway that is an alternative to US-40 and US-191. It serves the communities of Vernal, Lapoint, Neola, Cedarview, and Roosevelt.

== Route description ==
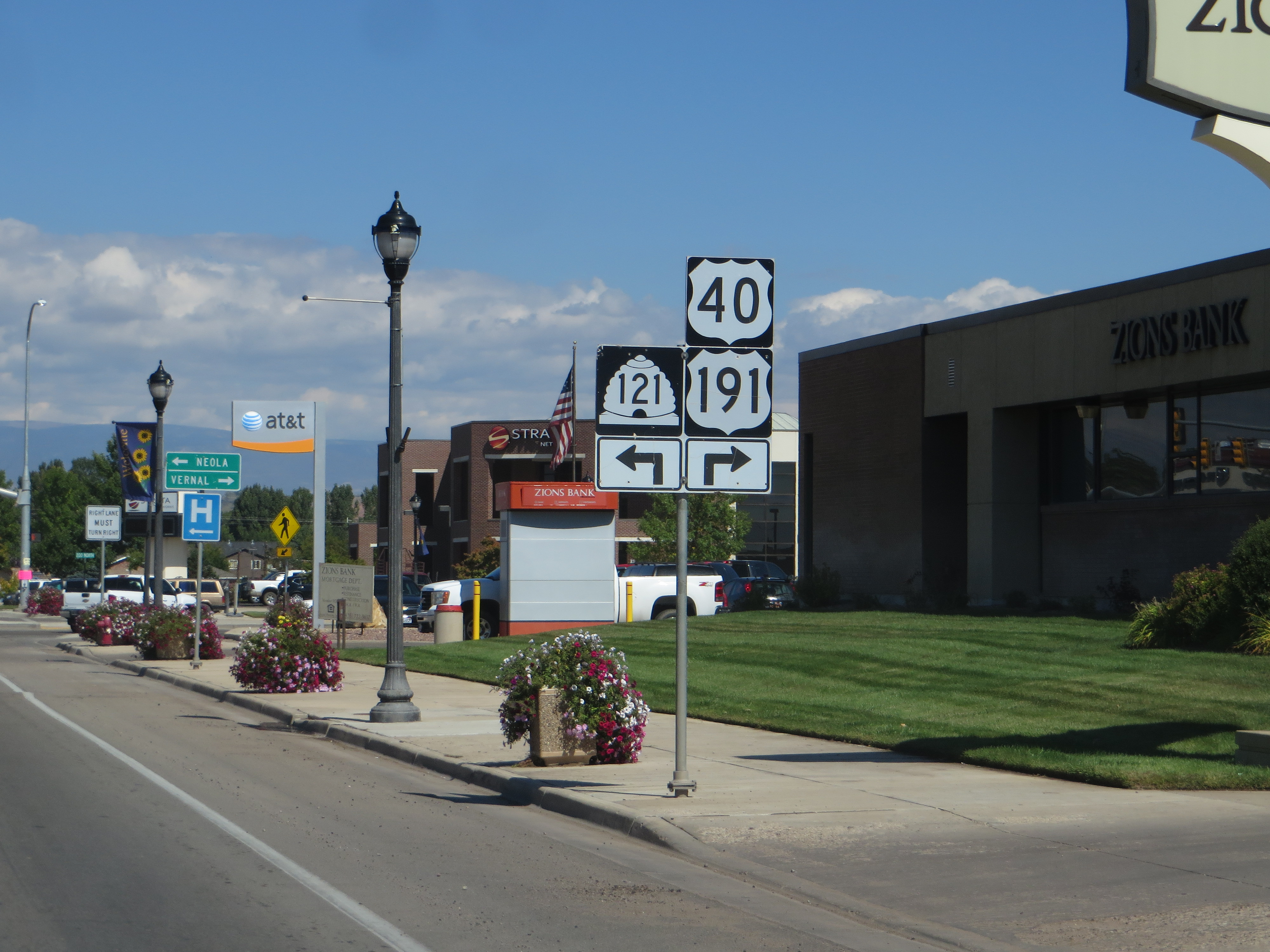
US-40 and US-191 approaching SR-121 in Roosevelt

Starting in Roosevelt at the intersection with US-40/US-191 (200 East), the route travels west for approximately one half mile, before turning northwest, then turning north through Cedarview to Neola. In Neola, the route makes a right turn onto 9000 North and begins travelling east. It generally follows this easterly direction across the Duchesne County/Uintah County county line, through Lapoint, before entering Vernal. In Vernal, the route makes a right turn, and travels south for less than one mile (1.6 km) before terminating at the intersection with Main Street US-40/US-191 (Main Street).

== History ==
The state legislature added the entire length of SR-121 to the state highway system in 1931 (though it was known as SR-122 until 1933). The route was truncated in 1953 to run only from Roosevelt to the east of Lapoint. A short piece at the east end was redesignated State Route 245, from Vernal west to the bridge over the Highline Canal west of Maeser, but the more rugged section between the bridges was removed from the state highway system. This split was undone in 1969, when SR-121 again became a continuous route from Roosevelt to Vernal.

== Major intersections ==
County	Location	mi	km	Destinations	Notes
Duchesne	Roosevelt	0.000	0.000	US 40 / US 191 (200 East)	Southern terminus
Uintah	Vernal	40.293	64.845	US 40 / US 191 (Main Street)	Northern terminus
1.000 mi = 1.609 km; 1.000 km = 0.621 mi
