= Bullionville, Utah =

Ghost town in Utah

Bullionville
- Ghost town
- Location within Utah Location within the United States
- Coordinates: 40°42′2.85″N 109°34′23.51″W
- Country: United States
- State: Utah
- County: Uintah
- Abandoned: c. 1938
- GNIS feature ID: 1437662

Bullionville is a ghost town in Uintah County, Utah, United States. In 1920, Bullionville was abandoned.

== Name ==
The name "Bullionville" was probably adopted around 1882, deriving from a small copper mine located nearby.
