= Şırnak Silopi power station =

Asphaltite-fired power station in Turkey

- Country: Turkey
- Coordinates: 37°18′36″N 42°35′41″E
- Status: Operational
- Commission date: 2009
- Owner: Ciner Group
- Employees: 1,000 (2019)

Thermal power station
- Primary fuel: Asphaltite

Power generation
- Nameplate capacity: 405 MW
- Annual net output: 1,568 GWh (2022); 2,223 GWh (2020); 2,324 GWh (2019); 2,373 GWh (2021)

External links
- Website: www.silopielektrik.com.tr

Şırnak Silopi power station (Turkish: Şırnak-Silopi Termik Santralı) is a 405 MW operational power station in Silopi, in Şırnak Province in the south-east of Turkey. It is fuelled with asphaltite from Silopi asphaltite mine.

== Operation ==
The plant was built in the early 21st century by Silopi Electric, which is part of the Ciner Group. It is fuelled with asphaltite from a nearby mine and serves over 650,000 people. Although its fuel is technically not coal it is regulated similarly; for example, the mining rights were tendered by TKİ, the state Turkish Coal Operations Authority. In 2020 the mining company said it planned an increase from 80 thousand tonnes per year to 250 thousand. Since the plant is further to the south-east than other fossil fuel power stations in Turkey, interconnection with the electricity sector in Iraq may be possible. Despite abundant local renewable resources, under the energy policy of Turkey the plant is subsidised: it received capacity payments of 45 million lira in 2018, and 61 million in 2019. According to Ciner Group, in addition to the 1,000 direct employees in the plant and nearby mine, the plant supports 2,000 local jobs indirectly.

== Environmental impact ==
It has been claimed that an increase in local illnesses is due to air pollution from the plant, and Hüseyin Kaçmaz, member of parliament for Şırnak, said in 2019 that the plant had damaged local people's health. Sulfur dioxide (SO_{2}) and nitrogen oxides (NO_{x}) emissions were within the 2018 limits, but the SO_{2} limit was halved to 200 milligrams per cubic metre from 1st January 2020. Turkey is not a signatory to the Aarhus Convention on public access to environmental information, and it is not publicly known how much pollution is currently being emitted. Guidance issued to local middle school teachers by the Ministry of Education describes the plant as environmentally friendly, but pupils are asked to note its advantages and disadvantages together with those of the mine.

The power station emits more than 2 megatonnes (Mt) of carbon dioxide (CO_{2}) a year (of the 500 Mt total greenhouse gas emissions by Turkey). As Turkey has no carbon emission trading it would not be economically viable to capture and store the gas.

== See also ==
- List of power stations in Turkey
