= Uinta Basin Rail =

Proposed rail line

- Map of the Whitmore Park alternative, the alternative approved by the Surface Transportation Board

Overview
- Locale: Uinta Basin, Utah

Technical
- Length: 100 miles (160 km)

Other
- Website: uintabasinrailway.com

The Uinta Basin Rail project is a proposed 100-mile (160 km) rail line to connect the shale oil rich Uinta Basin region of eastern Utah to the national rail network. Oil extracted from the Uinta Basin is mostly shipped by truck to refineries in Salt Lake City that can accommodate this crude, as it has a wax content that requires transport in insulated containers via truck or rail rather than pipeline since the oil will solidify at room temperature. Having a rail line to the area would facilitate transport to more distant refineries that can accommodate high-wax crude, including refineries in Texas and Louisiana that have expressed interest in using Uinta Basin oil.

Numerous proposals have been made, some as far back as 1902, that are still under consideration. The current effort is a public-private partnership between a coalition of 7 counties in Utah, the Rio Grande Pacific Corporation and Drexel Hamilton Infrastructure Partners. The railroad is also backed by the Ute Tribe who hold a 5% stake in the project. If the rail line is built it will be the first major greenfield rail line built in the United States since the Chicago and North Western’s line to the Powder River Basin was built in the early 1980s. The Surface Transportation Board approved construction of the line in December 2021, however, the approval was challenged in court by various environmentalist groups. On May 29, 2025, the Supreme Court of the United States ruled in favor of the Board and overturned the lower court block on construction.

== Past efforts ==
The Uinta basin's oil and mineral resources have long attracted the attention of railroad builders. The Denver, Northwestern and Pacific (DNW&P), later renamed to the Denver and Salt Lake Railway, was a company started in 1902 with a goal of connecting its namesake cities via the Uinta basin, to take advantage of these resources. While a significant portion of the line in Colorado was built, and still exists today, the company struggled financially and never progressed any closer than Craig, Colorado to the Uinta basin. After this effort failed, almost immediately other efforts began.

The only rail line connecting the basin to the rail network that was actually built was the Uintah Railway. However, while the line served the basin for a few years, this line was problematic from day one. The Uintah Railway had a break of gauge, as this branch line was narrow gauge but connected to a standard gauge main at Mack, Colorado. The line featured a 7.5% grade with 65-degree curves, and was so steep that only articulated Shay locomotives, specifically designed for this route, were capable of navigating a portion of the line. This resulted in a single cargo train having to be both re-gauged, and multiple locomotive changeovers to reach its destination. All but the last few miles of the line were in Colorado, and the line was more useful to ship goods to Colorado rather than other cities in Utah. The book Utah Ghost Rails documents that through a bureaucratic loophole, the USPS charged in-state rates for shipping between the basin and Salt Lake City, assuming a straight line distance to calculate the rate, despite them using the Uintah Railway, and having to route the mail to Colorado first and then back into Utah. This meant it was significantly cheaper to ship by mail than pay the railroad directly. A number of businesses soon discovered this loophole, and when the builders of a bank in the town of Vernal learned this, they shipped 30 tons of bricks, one at a time, by mail. This nearly bankrupted the Utah division of the postal service, forcing them to adjust the shipping zone boundaries and regulations to match the geographical isolation of the Uinta Basin from the rest of Utah. Once modern highways were built into the basin, the line was unable to compete with truck traffic and was abandoned in 1939.

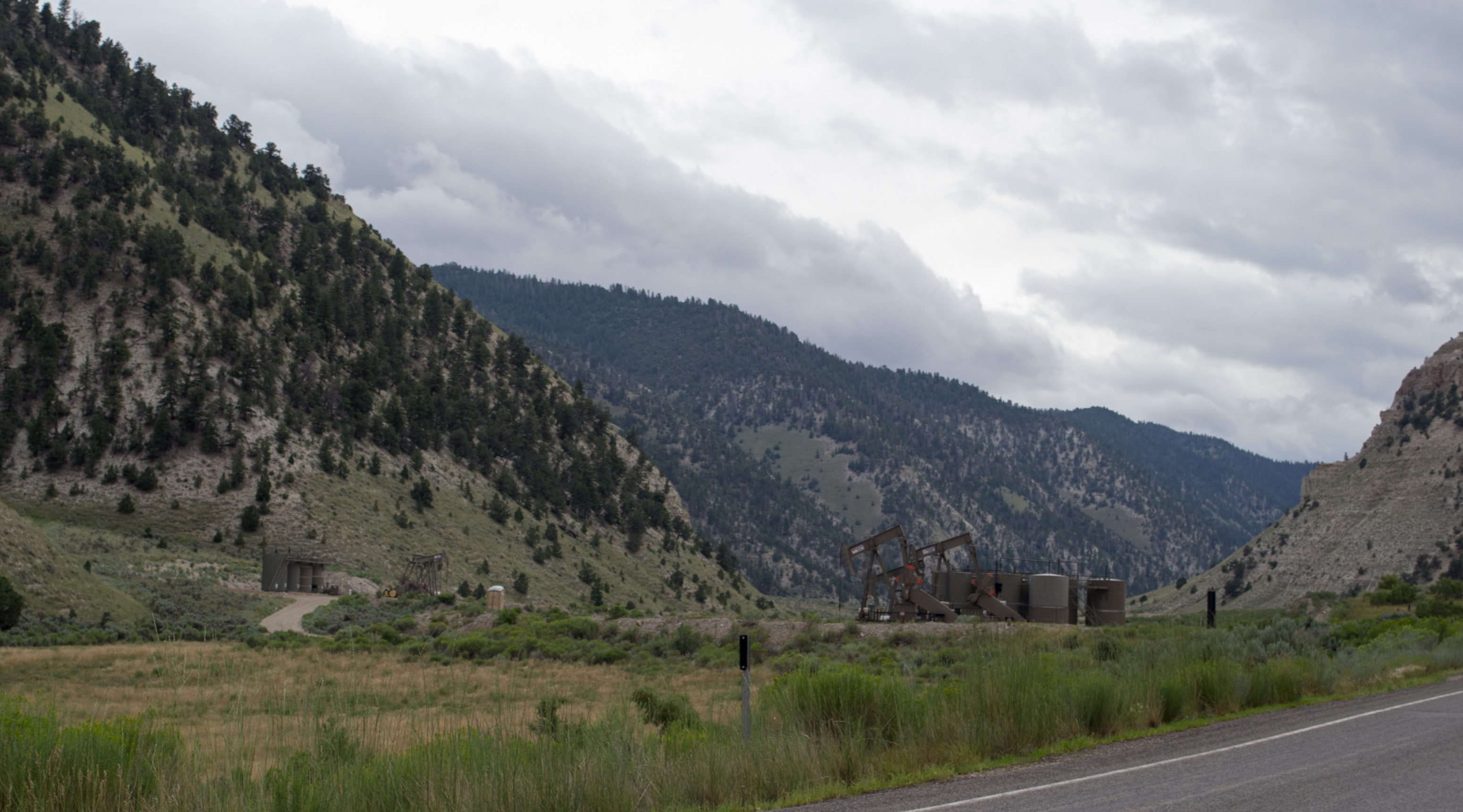
Indian Canyon, showing US 191 and an oil well. This canyon would provide the bulk of the route between Uinta Basin and the Central Corridor.

Even while the Uintah Railway was in operation, many companies attempted to build a standard gauge connection to the Uinta Basin. In 1915, the Union Pacific Railroad was reported to have dispatched surveying parties to find a route through the area. In early 1916, the Denver and Rio Grande Railroad filed a proposal for a line that would eventually extend into the basin, and in May the Los Angeles and Salt Lake Railroad began surveys for a route into the area branching from its line in Provo. In 1920, Simon Bamberger attempted to find financing to build the remainder of the unfinished D&SL route. None of these plans came to fruition.

In 1984, the Deseret Power Railway was built to connect a coal mine in Colorado with a power plant in Utah. The route is similar to a small portion of the unfinished D&SL route; however it is completely isolated from the national rail network.

== Utah Department of Transportation study ==
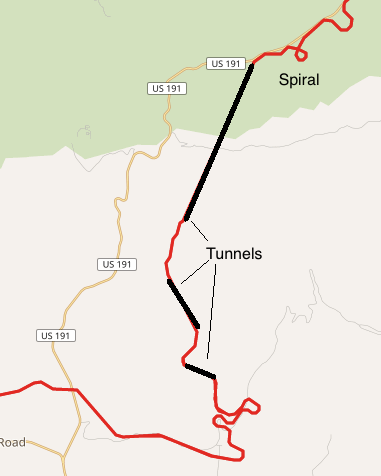
Map of the Whitmore Park alternative to route the rail line underneath the Roan Cliffs and West Tavaputs Plateau. Also visible is the existing route of U.S. Route 191.

In 2012, the Utah Department of Transportation (UDOT), working with the regional Six-County Infrastructure Coalition, began studying transportation in the basin, which is a major oil-producing region. The study determined that the existing infrastructure was unlikely to be able to move the expected volume of oil. In 2013, HDR Engineering, working with the state, began surveying the area for a rail line. After examining 26 potential routings, the state recommended a route east through the Indian Canyon from the Union Pacific Railroad's Central Corridor line near Soldier Summit to Duchesne and Roosevelt in the basin. The right of way would largely follow existing roadways, US Route 191 from the rail main through Indian Canyon to the basin and US Route 40 once inside the basin. There would be two terminals for oil trains at the mid and endpoints of the railroad. The key feature of this route would be a 10-mile (16 km) tunnel underneath the Roan Cliffs of the West Tavaputs Plateau, to bypass the 9,144 feet (2,787 m) mountain pass used by US 191 in this area, that if built would be the longest railroad tunnel in Utah.

In late 2014, after selecting the routing, the state began studying the cost, estimated to be up to $4 billion. With a total of $8.2 million in funding from the state, the Department of Transportation also began work on the Environmental Impact Statement (EIS) for the railroad, with planned to complete the document by the end of 2016. Several months after beginning work on the EIS, however, the state decided to end study of the route, citing rising costs identified by closer study. Kevin Van Tassell, a member of the state legislature's transportation committee, said the state would "look at other systems to move product out of the basin other than the railroad at this time."

Though the EIS was cancelled, UDOT's report was published in 2015 recommending the line as a top priority for Utah's rail infrastructure, noting the strain the lack of rail access is placing on highways that serve the basin, and the price disadvantage caused by lack of rail access compared to other oil-producing regions with rail. Most of the oil is trucked to refineries in Salt Lake City. Connecting to the national rail network would facilitate the transportation of crude oil to refineries in Texas and Louisiana. The study identified multiple possible rail corridors, stating before selecting the Indian Canyon alternative, they originally considered a route via Rifle, Colorado, but noted this route is mostly in Colorado, not Utah. The state of Colorado was not assisting in the studies or providing funding.

== Public private partnership ==
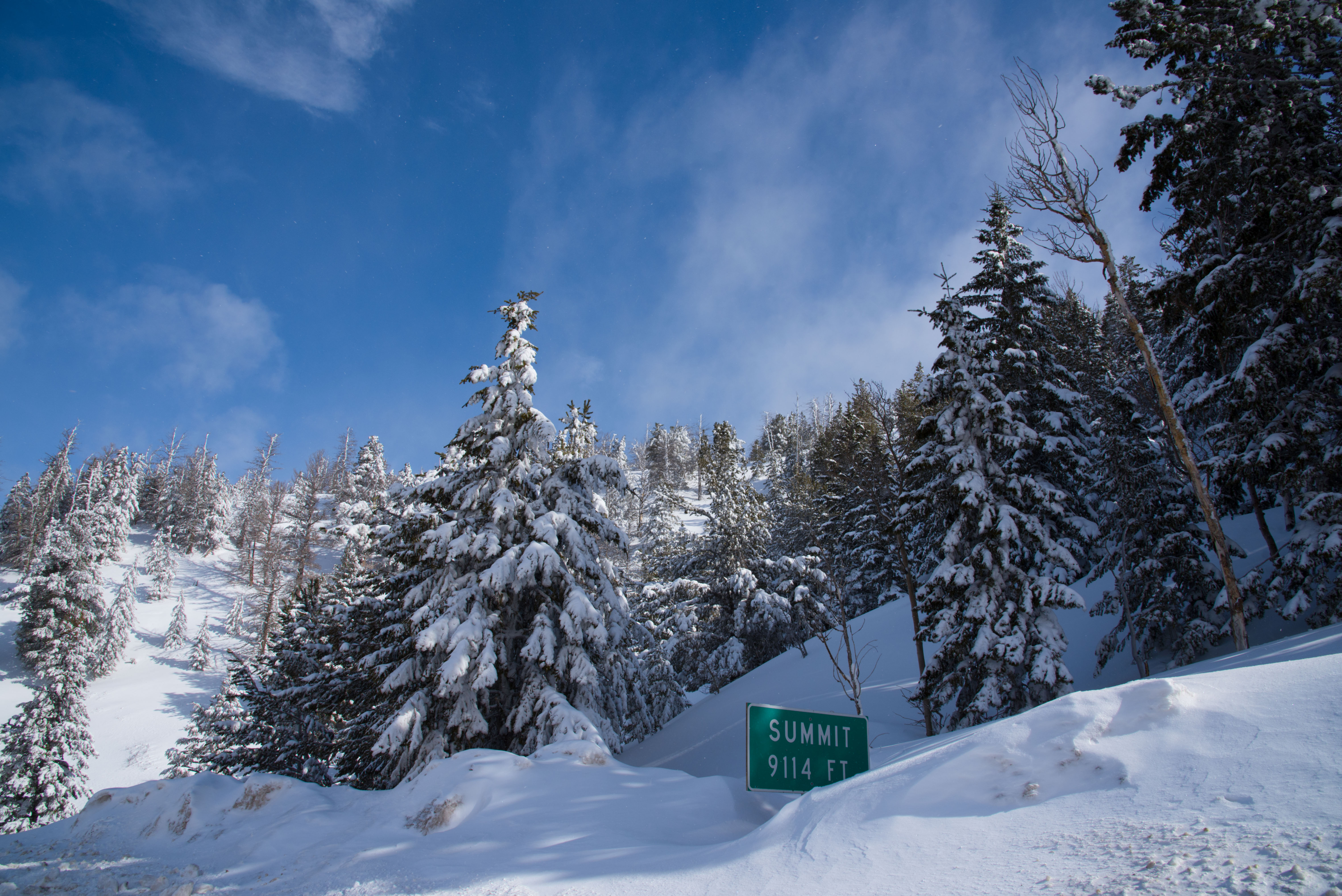
Indian Creek Pass along U.S. Route 191 in Utah, the route will tunnel underneath this pass

In 2019, the Seven County Infrastructure Coalition (successor agency to the Six County Infrastructure Coalition) partnered with Rio Grande Pacific Corporation, a shortline railroad holding company, and identified 29 potential rail corridors, using the earlier UDOT study as a base. In addition to the routes identified by UDOT, this study considered historical routes surveyed a century prior. Their study opined that the line was feasible, and that UDOT had included elements in the design that could be modified or eliminated to cut costs.

The coalition initially submitted four routes to the Surface Transportation Board (STB) for detailed study and an Environmental Impact Statement. Three of these would connect to the Central Corridor near Soldier Summit and proceed north east towards the basin. The fourth option would extend the former D&SL line from its terminus in Craig. It would use the existing Deseret Power Railway for a portion of the journey, and in so doing connect that line to the national rail network as well. The study noted that the Craig alternative traversed the easiest terrain, was the only option to not require constructing tunnels, and overall was one of the lower-cost options. The Craig option required the most new track to be built. The STB announced they had removed this option from consideration while reviewing and preparing the Environmental Impact statement on December 13, 2019. Both agencies cited a concern that while the Central Corridor is subject to a trackage rights agreement that allows a number of rail companies access to the line, there is no such agreement in place for the branch to Craig. The Craig alternative required negotiating access agreements with 3 separate track owners, and after months of negotiation, no agreement with any owner had been reached. Two of the track owners used the line exclusively for transporting coal, whose business has dramatically decreased. Even if access rights could be secured, the STB and the coalition decided there was a risk the Uinta Basin Rail operators could be forced to assume ownership and/or maintenance costs for these sections, should coal volumes continue to decrease.

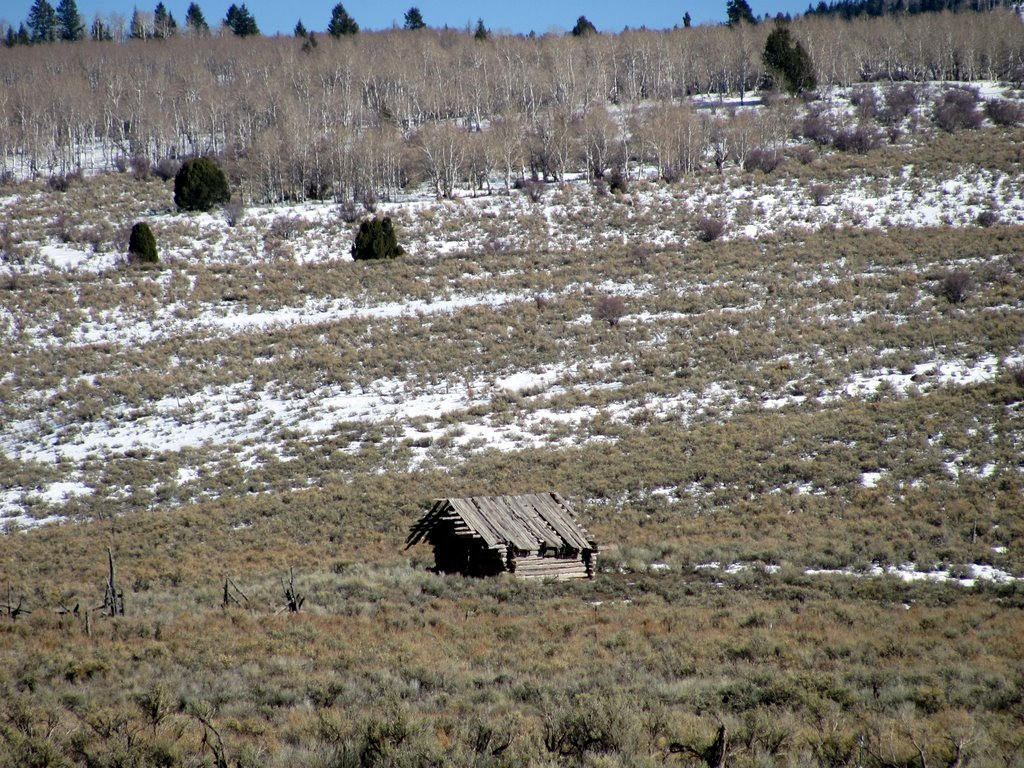
A cabin in the Whitmore Park area just below the Roan Cliffs. This is the approximate location where the line would have a series of horseshoe curves to ascend to the base the cliffs, before entering the southernmost of 3 tunnels under the cliffs.

Of the 3 routes remaining under study, the Surface Transportation Board recommended one called the Whitmore Park alternative as having the least environmental impact, and approved its construction. This alternative is based on the Indian Canyon alternative surveyed by UDOT. The route was modified to include horseshoe curves and spirals to scale higher up the Roan Cliffs and West Tavaputs Plateau, which would allow the length of the tunnel into Indian Canyon to be shortened to 3.1 miles (5.0 km). Other modifications included using a longer route and side canyons to scale the Roan Cliffs, avoiding a landslide area identified as a risk by UDOT, and adjusted routing in parts of the basin for easier land access rights. In September 2020, it was announced that Drexel Hamilton Infrastructure Partners, LP (DHIP) would fund construction for the line and have the exclusive right to develop the line, thus giving the rail project the green light to start construction.

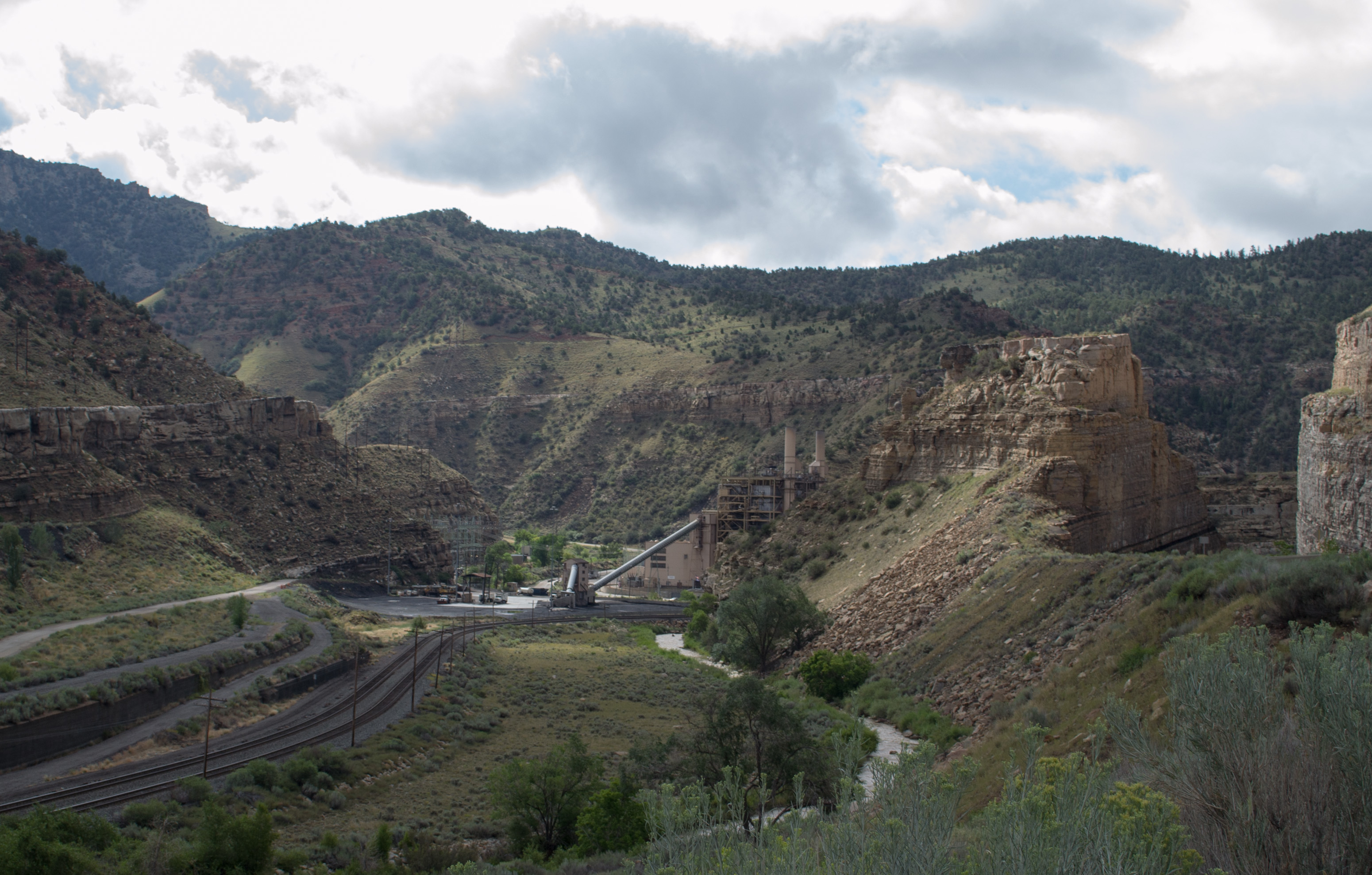
The retired Carbon Power Plant at the junction of US 191 and US 6 inside the Price River Canyon. Also visible is the Central Corridor. The Uinta Basin Rail line would connect to the main a few miles west of this point.

The Surface Transportation Board issued their approval in December 2021. In 2022 construction contracts for the railroad's construction particularly for the tunnels along the route were announced with AECOM, a joint venture with Skanska & W.W. Clyde Company, and Obayashi Corporation as principal partners. The US Forest Service granted right-of-way through 12 miles (19 km) of Ashley National Forest and upheld the decision when challenged by several environmental groups. In 2026, Integrated Rail and Resources received a tax credit reduction from the State of Utah in connection to the project.

== Legal challenges ==
Environmentalist activists organized efforts to block construction, citing the pristine nature of the mountains where construction will take place and concerns of cost overruns given the difficult terrain. Both supporters and opponents of this line have noted it could create spillover pressure to reopen the Tennessee Pass Line, dormant since 1997, to avoid a surge in oil trains through the Moffat Tunnel and down into Denver.

In December 2020, environmentalist groups filed a lawsuit attempting to block construction, claiming the project is primarily to benefit fossil fuel extraction. Some of the funding allocated to the project was instead intended to help diversify the economy of rural Utah away from fossil fuels. The $28 million grant by the Utah Community Impact Fund Board was upheld in July 2022 after being challenged. On August 18, 2023, a Federal Appeals Court halted the project pending "a more fulsome explanation for the Board’s conclusion that the Railway’s transportation benefits outweighed the project’s environmental impacts". since the Forest Service decision relied on the Surface Transportation Board’s environmental review, the Service withdrew its record of decision and amendment in February 2024. In March 2024 the project backers petitioned the US Supreme Court to decide if "...National Environmental Policy Act requires an agency to study environmental impacts beyond the proximate effects of the action over which the agency has regulatory authority".

The Supreme Court issued an opinion on Seven County Infrastructure Coalition v. Eagle County on May 29, 2025. In an 8 to 0 ruling (with one judge abstaining) the court declared the lower court had incorrectly interpreted the National Environmental Policy Act (NEPA). Justice Brett Kavanaugh delivered the opinion of the court stating the purpose of NEPA was to provide a "purely procedural statue (which) simply requires an agency to prepare an EIS." In a concurring statement Justice Sonia Sotomayor stated that "the Surface Transportation Board would not be responsible for the harms caused by the oil industry" while arguing the Supreme Court's ruling followed establish precedent. A reaction to the court opinion from law professor Richard Lazarus stated the court's opinion significantly changes the interpretation of NEPA, "Right or wrong, that's not been the NEPA law for 50 years."
