= Rainbow, Utah =

Ghost town in Utah

Rainbow
- Ghost town
- Location within Utah Location within the United States
- Coordinates: 39°52′54.8″N 109°09′30.6″W
- Country: United States
- State: Utah
- County: Uintah
- Abandoned: c. 1938
- Elevation: 6,178 ft (1,883 m)
- GNIS feature ID: 1437662

Rainbow is a ghost town in Uintah County, Utah, United States. In 1938, Rainbow was abandoned.

== Name ==
The town was named for the nearby Rainbow Mine.

== Transportation ==
the Uintah Railway was constructed in 1904 from Mack, Colorado, to Watson. The railway line served the gilsonite mining communities of Dragon, Watson and Rainbow. The Uintah Railway service was ended in 1939.
