= Uintah County, Utah =

County in Utah, United States

- County
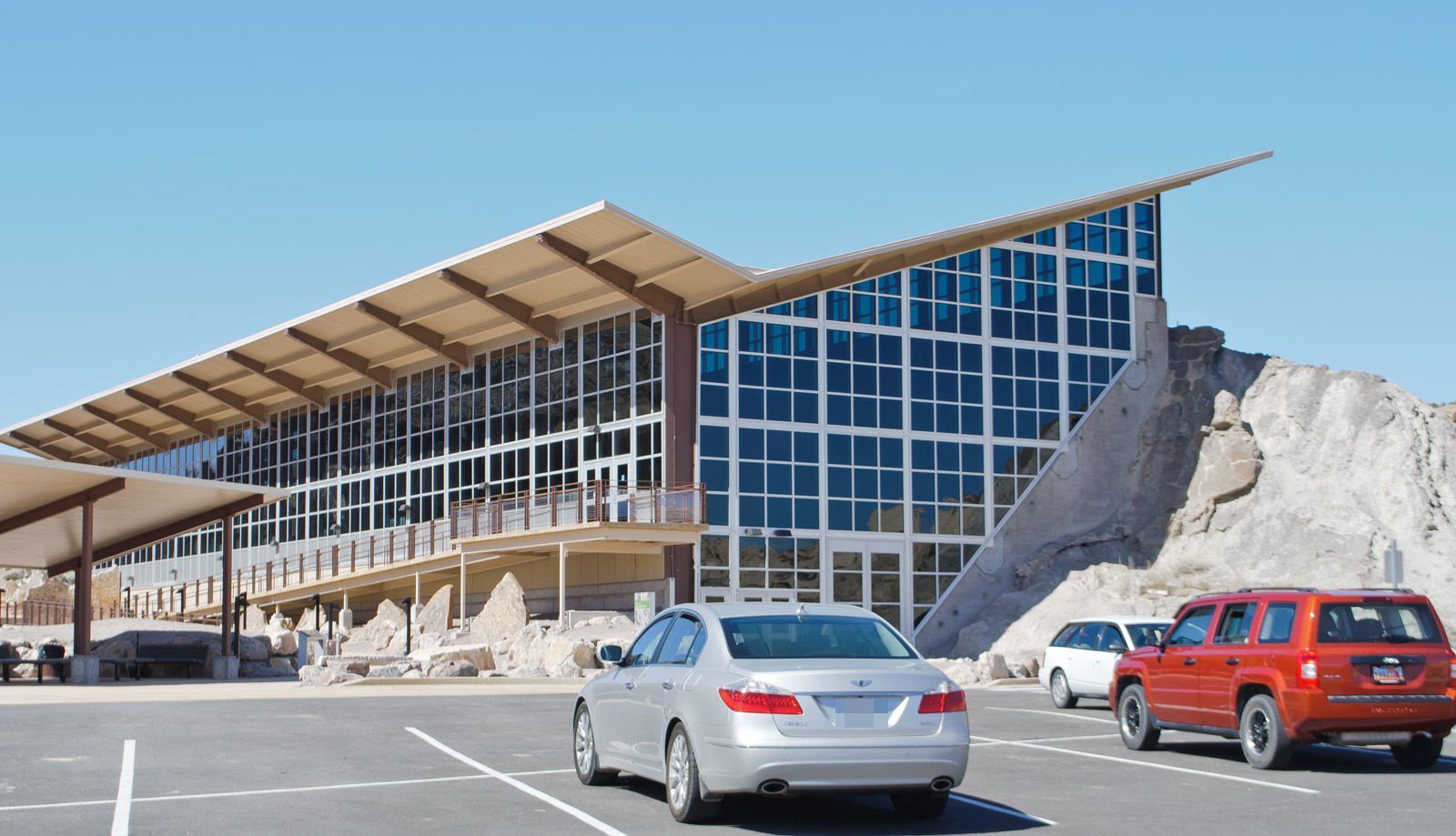
- Quarry Visitor Center at Dinosaur National Monument.

- Location within the U.S. state of Utah
- Coordinates: 40°08′N 109°31′W
- Country: United States
- State: Utah
- Founded: February 18, 1880
- Named for: Ute Tribe
- Seat: Vernal
- Largest city: Vernal

Area
  - Total: 4,501 sq mi (11,660 km^{2})
  - Land: 4,480 sq mi (11,600 km^{2})
  - Water: 22 sq mi (57 km^{2}) 0.5%

Population (2020)
  - Total: 35,620
  - Estimate (2025): 38,278 ▲
  - Density: 7.95/sq mi (3.07/km^{2})
- Time zone: UTC−7 (Mountain)
  - Summer (DST): UTC−6 (MDT)
- Congressional district: 3rd
- Website: www.uintah.gov

Uintah County (/juːˈɪntə/ yoo-IN-tə) is a county in the U.S. state of Utah. As of the 2020 United States census the population was 35,620. Its county seat and largest city is Vernal. The county was named for the portion of the Ute Indian tribe that lived in the basin.

Uintah County is the largest natural gas producer in Utah, with 272 billion cubic feet produced in 2008.

The Vernal, UT Micropolitan Statistical Area includes all of Uintah County.

Uintah County is home to one of the nine statewide regional campuses of Utah State University (located in the city of Vernal) and serves as a gateway to Dinosaur National Monument, contains the Red Fleet State Park, and the Uintah Mountain Range.

== History ==
Archeological evidence suggests that portions of the Uinta Basin have been inhabited by Archaic peoples and Fremont peoples. By the time of recorded history, its inhabitants were the Ute people. The first known traverse by non-Indians was made by Fathers Domínguez and Escalante (1776), as they sought to establish a land route between California and Spanish America.

The region was claimed by the Spanish Empire as the Alta California division of New Spain (1521-1821) and was later under Mexican control (1821-1848). Neither the Spanish Empire nor Mexico ever had a major presence in the area and their practical control was nominal.

By the early nineteenth century, occasional fur trappers entered the Basin. In 1831-32 Antoine Robidoux, a French trapper licensed by the Mexican government established a trading post near present-day Whiterocks. He abandoned the effort in 1844.

In 1847 a contingent of Mormons under Brigham Young entered the Great Salt Lake Valley to the west of the Uintah region to establish what would become Salt Lake City. In 1861 Young dispatched an exploring party to the Uinta Basin; they reported "that section of country lying between the Wasatch Mountains and the eastern boundary of the territory, and south of Green River country, was one vast contiguity of waste and measurably valueless." Young made no further effort to establish communities in the area but nonetheless included it in their proposed State of Deseret.

The United States took possession under the 1848 Treaty of Guadalupe Hidalgo. In 1861 US President Abraham Lincoln created the Uintah and Ouray Indian Reservation, reserved for the use and habitation of Utah and Colorado Indians. In the 1880s, the Uncompahgre Reservation was created in the southern portion of present-day Uintah County. Ashley Valley was not part of either Reservation; by 1880, enough ranchers and farmers had settled there that the Territorial Legislature created Uintah County from portions of Sanpete, Summit, and Wasatch counties. They established the county seat at Ashley, a now-abandoned settlement three miles north of the present courthouse in Vernal.

Uintah County boundaries were altered in 1892 (Grand County created), in 1917 (adjustments with Duchesne and Summit county boundaries), in 1918 (Daggett County created), and in 1919 (the Daggett boundary line was adjusted). It has remained in its present configuration since 1919.

Gilsonite was discovered in 1888 at Bonanza, in central Uintah County. This mineral was located on Reservation land, and, according to several sources, miners pressured the US government to remove about 7000 acres (11 square miles (28 km^{2}) from the Reservation. Mining and its associated activities rapidly boomed in that area.

The northern boundary of Uintah County originally extended to the north border of Utah. In 1918, the extreme northern portion (lying north of the Uinta Mountain watershed divide) was split off to form Daggett County.

== Geography ==
Uintah County lies on the east side of Utah. Its eastern border abuts the western border of the state of Colorado. The Green River flows southwestward through the central part of the county and forms the lower part of Uintah County's border with Duchesne County. Two miles south of Ouray, Utah, it is joined by the Duchesne River (flowing east-southeastward from Duchesne County), and three miles (4.8 km) farther down by the White River (flowing west-northwestward from Colorado). Ten miles farther downstream, it is joined by Willow Creek, flowing northward from the lower part of the county. The county terrain slopes to the south and to the west, with its highest parts found on the crests of the Uinta Mountains, running east–west across the northern border. The maximum elevation along those crests is around 12,276 ft (3,742 m). The county has a total area of 4,501 square miles (11,660 km^{2}), of which 4,480 square miles (11,600 km^{2}) is land and 22 square miles (57 km^{2}) (0.5%) is water.

Uintah County is centered in the Uintah Basin, which runs from western Colorado on the east to the Wasatch Mountains on the west and from the Uinta Mountains on the north to the Roan Plateau on the south. This basin was formed by a prehistoric lake ("Uinta Lake") during the late Tertiary period.

The county's geography ranges from high mountain terrain (Uinta Mountains) to the fertile Ashley Valley (site of the county seat), to a rugged and desolate canyonland which includes the Dinosaur National Monument, to desolate and largely uninhabited hills in the south ("The Bookcliffs" to locals; officially Roan Plateau).

=== Mines ===
- Dyer Mine, (copper, gold, silver)40°44′7.63″N 109°34′6.1″W, elevation: 9,852 feet (3,003 m) MSL
- Little Water Mine, (coal)40°32′15.37″N 109°49′20.54″W, elevation: 6,913 feet (2,107 m) MSL
- Uteland Mine, (coal) 40°3′3.02″N 109°44′29.55″W, elevation 4,675 feet (1,425 m) MSL
- Black Dragon Mine, (Gilsonite)) 40°32'15.4"N 109°49'20.5"W

=== Major highways ===
- U.S. Route 40
- US Route 191
- Utah State Route 45
- Utah State Route 88
- Utah State Route 121

=== Adjacent counties ===
- Daggett County - north
- Moffat County, Colorado - northeast
- Rio Blanco County, Colorado - east
- Garfield County, Colorado - southeast
- Grand County - south
- Emery County - southwest
- Carbon County - west
- Duchesne County - west

=== Protected areas ===
- Ashley National Forest (part)
- Dinosaur National Monument (part)
- Horseshoe Bend State Park
- Musket Shot Springs Scenic Overlook
- Ouray National Wildlife Refuge
- Point of Pines Recreation Site (part)
- Pot Creek Recreation Site
- Red Fleet State Park
- Sears Canyon Wildlife Management Area
- Steinaker State Park
- Stewart Lake Waterfowl Management Area

=== Lakes ===
- Alma Taylor Lake
- Ashley Twin Lakes
- Association Reservoir
- Big Lake
- Billeys Reservoir
- Blue Lake
- Bottle Hollow Reservoir
- Box Reservoir
- Brough Reservoir
- Bullock Draw Reservoir
- Bullwinkle Reservoir
- Burns Bench Reservoir
- Burton Reservoir
- Butte Reservoir
- Cement Reservoir
- Chimney Rock Lake
- Chokecherry Flat Reservoir
- Counting Station Reservoir
- Cow Wash Reservoir
- Crouse Reservoir
- Dead Lake
- Deadman Lake
- Dollar Lake
- East Park Reservoir
- Fish Lake
- Flu Knoll Reservoir
- Goose Lakes
  - Lower Goose Lake
  - Upper Goose Lake
- Gull Lake
- Hacking Lake
- Hacking Reservoir
- Hatch Reservoir
- Herman-Sadlier Reservoir
- Hopper Lakes
- Johnson Lake
- Julius Park Reservoir
- Kibah Lakes
- Kilroy Reservoir
- Lake Wilde
- Lily Lake
- Lily Pad Lake
- Little Elk Lake
- Little Lake
- Long Park Reservoir
- Lower Grouse Reservoir
- Lynn Haslem Reservoir
- McCoy Reservoir Number 1
- McCoy Reservoir Number 2
- Matt Warner Reservoir
- Merkley Reservoir
- Mill Pond
- Moap Lake
- Montes Creek Reservoir
- Mytoge Lake
- Oaks Park Reservoir
- Paradise Park Reservoir
- Pariette East Dike Reservoir
- Pariette Flood Control Reservoir
- Paul Lake
- Pearl Lake
- Pelican Lake
- Red Belly Lake
- Red Fleet Reservoir
- Sand Lake
- Saucer Lake
- Shiner Reservoir
- Siddoways Reservoir
- Stauffer Chemical Tailings Pond North
- Steinaker Reservoir
- Stewart Lake
- Sunday School Reservoir
- Teds Lake
- Towave Reservoir
- Twin Lakes
- Warren Draw
- Watkins Lake (part)
- Whiterocks Lake
- Wooley Lakes
- Wooley Reservoir
- Workman Lake (part)
- Zelph Calder Reservoir

== Demographics ==
Historical population
Census	Pop.	Note	%±
1880	799		—
1890	2,762		245.7%
1900	6,458		133.8%
1910	7,050		9.2%
1920	8,470		20.1%
1930	9,035		6.7%
1940	9,898		9.6%
1950	10,300		4.1%
1960	11,582		12.4%
1970	12,684		9.5%
1980	20,506		61.7%
1990	22,211		8.3%
2000	25,224		13.6%
2010	32,588		29.2%
2020	35,620		9.3%
2025 (est.)	38,278	▲	7.5%
US Decennial Census; 1790–1960 1900–1990; 1990–2000 2010–2020

=== Racial and ethnic composition ===
Uintah County, Utah – Racial and ethnic composition Note: the US Census treats Hispanic/Latino as an ethnic category. This table excludes Latinos from the racial categories and assigns them to a separate category. Hispanics/Latinos may be of any race.
Race / Ethnicity (NH = Non-Hispanic)	Pop 1980	Pop 1990	Pop 2000	Pop 2010	Pop 2020	% 1980	% 1990	% 2000	% 2010	% 2020
White alone (NH)	17,966	19,178	21,662	26,999	28,726	87.61%	86.34%	85.88%	82.85%	80.65%
Black or African American alone (NH)	6	9	26	96	90	0.03%	0.04%	0.10%	0.29%	0.25%
Native American or Alaska Native alone (NH)	1,952	2,238	2,264	2,375	2,277	9.52%	10.08%	8.98%	7.29%	6.39%
Asian alone (NH)	17	80	56	159	157	0.08%	0.36%	0.22%	0.49%	0.44%
Native Hawaiian or Pacific Islander alone (NH)	x	x	19	71	97	x	x	0.08%	0.22%	0.27%
Other race alone (NH)	0	15	7	10	116	0.00%	0.07%	0.03%	0.03%	0.33%
Mixed race or Multiracial (NH)	x	x	296	548	1,323	x	x	1.17%	1.68%	3.71%
Hispanic or Latino (any race)	565	691	894	2,330	2,834	2.76%	3.11%	3.54%	7.15%	7.96%
Total	20,506	22,211	25,224	32,588	35,620	100.00%	100.00%	100.00%	100.00%	100.00%

=== 2020 census ===
According to the 2020 United States census and 2020 American Community Survey, there were 35,620 people in Uintah County with a population density of 7.9 people per square mile (3.1/km^{2}). Among non-Hispanic or Latino people, the racial makeup was 28,726 (80.6%) White, 90 (0.3%) African American, 2,277 (6.4%) Native American, 157 (0.4%) Asian, 97 (0.3%) Pacific Islander, 116 (0.3%) from other races, and 1,323 (3.7%) from two or more races. 2,834 (8.0%) people were Hispanic or Latino.

There were 17,686 (49.65%) males and 17,934 (50.35%) females, and the population distribution by age was 11,774 (33.1%) under the age of 18, 19,676 (55.2%) from 18 to 64, and 4,170 (11.7%) who were at least 65 years old. The median age was 31.5 years.

There were 11,993 households in Uintah County with an average size of 2.97 of which 8,898 (74.2%) were families and 3,095 (25.8%) were non-families. Among all families, 6,888 (57.4%) were married couples, 695 (5.8%) were male householders with no spouse, and 1,315 (11.0%) were female householders with no spouse. Among all non-families, 2,546 (21.2%) were a single person living alone and 549 (4.6%) were two or more people living together. 5,126 (42.7%) of all households had children under the age of 18. 8,626 (71.9%) of households were owner-occupied while 3,367 (28.1%) were renter-occupied.

The median income for a Uintah County household was $59,428 and the median family income was $72,620, with a per-capita income of $24,578. The median income for males that were full-time employees was $56,101 and for females $35,259. 13.2% of the population and 9.8% of families were below the poverty line.

In terms of education attainment, out of the 20,893 people in Uintah County 25 years or older, 2,412 (11.5%) had not completed high school, 7,958 (38.1%) had a high school diploma or equivalency, 7,119 (34.1%) had some college or associate degree, 2,505 (12.0%) had a bachelor's degree, and 899 (4.3%) had a graduate or professional degree.

== Economy ==
The extraction of natural resources, including oil, natural gas, phosphate, and gilsonite constitute primary economic activity of Uintah County. There is some agriculture in Uintah County, primarily focusing on raising cattle and sheep and cultivating alfalfa.

A significant portion of west Uintah County is taken up by the Uintah and Ouray Indian Reservation. The Ute Tribe's headquarters is in Fort Duchesne. Much of the rest of the county is land owned by the Ashley National Forest and the Bureau of Land Management. There is relatively little private land in the county.

The discovery of significant dinosaurs and other pre-historic remains on the eastern edge of the county caused nationwide interest, which culminated in the establishment of Dinosaur National Monument. In addition to the large Visitor Center at the Monument's Jensen site, a natural history museum, the Utah Field House of Natural History State Park Museum, showcasing some of the area's finds, was established in Vernal by the State of Utah.

== Transportation ==
=== Airport ===
Located in southeastern Vernal, the Vernal Regional Airport provides daily scheduled air service to Denver, Colorado via Denver International Airport. Service is provided through United Express, operated by Skywest airlines. Fixed-Base Operator (FBO) service is available.

== Politics and government ==
Since 1896 when Utah was admitted to The Union, Uintah County has voted for the Democratic presidential nominee eight times: twice from 1896 to 1900, once in 1916, and five times from 1932 to 1948. Only once has the majority voted for a "third party" candidate, that being Theodore Roosevelt in 1912. Since 1948, like most of Utah, Uintah County has voted Republican by substantial margins.

State elected offices
Position	District	Name	Affiliation	First elected
Senate	26	Ronald Winterton	Republican	2018
House of Representatives	55	Scott Chew	Republican	2014
Board of Education	12	James Moss Jr.	Republican	2020

United States presidential election results for Uintah County, Utah
Year	Republican		Democratic		Third party(ies)	
Year	No.	%	No.	%	No.	%
1896	112	11.18%	890	88.82%	0	0.00%
1900	639	45.13%	773	54.59%	4	0.28%
1904	753	50.40%	630	42.17%	111	7.43%
1908	778	48.44%	683	42.53%	145	9.03%
1912	545	28.40%	566	29.49%	808	42.11%
1916	712	31.28%	1,459	64.10%	105	4.61%
1920	1,354	60.47%	817	36.49%	68	3.04%
1924	1,296	60.90%	716	33.65%	116	5.45%
1928	1,589	64.00%	880	35.44%	14	0.56%
1932	1,355	42.48%	1,778	55.74%	57	1.79%
1936	1,193	36.62%	1,986	60.96%	79	2.42%
1940	1,624	47.78%	1,773	52.16%	2	0.06%
1944	1,479	49.30%	1,519	50.63%	2	0.07%
1948	1,513	47.99%	1,622	51.44%	18	0.57%
1952	2,806	71.18%	1,136	28.82%	0	0.00%
1956	2,840	77.60%	820	22.40%	0	0.00%
1960	2,882	67.62%	1,380	32.38%	0	0.00%
1964	2,437	53.22%	2,142	46.78%	0	0.00%
1968	3,034	65.64%	1,145	24.77%	443	9.58%
1972	4,712	80.30%	716	12.20%	440	7.50%
1976	4,017	69.18%	1,342	23.11%	448	7.71%
1980	6,045	82.45%	1,049	14.31%	238	3.25%
1984	7,337	85.57%	1,186	13.83%	51	0.59%
1988	5,341	74.00%	1,799	24.92%	78	1.08%
1992	3,505	45.09%	1,374	17.67%	2,895	37.24%
1996	4,743	63.55%	1,714	22.96%	1,007	13.49%
2000	6,733	80.18%	1,387	16.52%	277	3.30%
2004	8,518	85.55%	1,266	12.71%	173	1.74%
2008	8,441	82.84%	1,462	14.35%	286	2.81%
2012	10,421	89.75%	997	8.59%	193	1.66%
2016	9,810	76.26%	995	7.73%	2,059	16.01%
2020	13,261	86.63%	1,663	10.86%	383	2.50%
2024	13,599	85.90%	1,952	12.33%	281	1.77%

== Communities ==
=== Cities ===
- Ballard
- Naples
- Vernal (county seat)

=== Census-designated places ===
- Bonanza
- Fort Duchesne
- Jensen
- Lapoint
- Maeser
- Randlett
- Whiterocks

=== Unincorporated communities ===
- Avalon
- Bennett
- Dry Fork
- Gusher
- Hayden
- Leeton
- Leota
- Ouray
- Red Wash
- Tridell

=== Ghost towns ===
- Dragon
- Rainbow
- Watson
- Bullionville

== Education ==
There is one school district, Uintah School District.

== Sister cities ==
Barkly Region, Northern Territory, Australia

== See also ==
- Fantasy Canyon
- National Register of Historic Places listings in Uintah County, Utah
- Uintah and Ouray Indian Reservation
