= Neola, Utah =

- Census-designated place
- Location in Duchesne County and the state of Utah
- Coordinates: 40°26′03″N 110°01′51″W
- Country: United States
- State: Utah
- County: Duchesne

Area
  - Total: 3.78 sq mi (9.78 km^{2})
  - Land: 3.77 sq mi (9.77 km^{2})
  - Water: 0.0039 sq mi (0.01 km^{2})
- Elevation: 6,037 ft (1,840 m)

Population (2020)
  - Total: 491
  - Density: 130/sq mi (50.3/km^{2})
- Time zone: UTC-7 (Mountain (MST))
  - Summer (DST): UTC-6 (MDT)
- ZIP code: 84053
- Area code: 435
- FIPS code: 49-54110
- GNIS feature ID: 2408913

Neola is a census-designated place (CDP) in Duchesne County, Utah, United States. The population was 491 at the 2020 census. Neola was established in 1912.

== Geography ==
Neola is located in eastern Duchesne County, 10 miles (16 km) north of Roosevelt via Utah State Route 121. According to the United States Census Bureau, the CDP has a total area of 3.8 square miles (9.8 km^{2}), of which 0.004 square miles (0.01 km^{2}), or 0.13%, is water.

=== Climate ===
According to the Köppen Climate Classification system, Neola has a semi-arid climate, abbreviated "BSk" on climate maps.

Climate data for Neola, Utah, 1991–2020 normals, extremes 1956–present
Month	Jan	Feb	Mar	Apr	May	Jun	Jul	Aug	Sep	Oct	Nov	Dec	Year
Record high °F (°C)	55 (13)	63 (17)	76 (24)	83 (28)	94 (34)	96 (36)	99 (37)	98 (37)	93 (34)	81 (27)	66 (19)	59 (15)	99 (37)
Mean maximum °F (°C)	43.4 (6.3)	50.5 (10.3)	65.7 (18.7)	75.0 (23.9)	82.4 (28.0)	89.6 (32.0)	93.0 (33.9)	91.0 (32.8)	85.3 (29.6)	74.5 (23.6)	58.8 (14.9)	46.6 (8.1)	93.6 (34.2)
Mean daily maximum °F (°C)	30.5 (−0.8)	37.4 (3.0)	50.6 (10.3)	58.9 (14.9)	68.4 (20.2)	78.6 (25.9)	85.4 (29.7)	82.5 (28.1)	74.0 (23.3)	59.9 (15.5)	44.6 (7.0)	31.4 (−0.3)	58.5 (14.7)
Daily mean °F (°C)	19.8 (−6.8)	26.4 (−3.1)	38.0 (3.3)	44.9 (7.2)	54.2 (12.3)	63.4 (17.4)	70.3 (21.3)	67.7 (19.8)	59.2 (15.1)	46.4 (8.0)	33.2 (0.7)	21.4 (−5.9)	45.4 (7.4)
Mean daily minimum °F (°C)	9.1 (−12.7)	15.4 (−9.2)	25.3 (−3.7)	30.8 (−0.7)	39.9 (4.4)	48.1 (8.9)	55.1 (12.8)	52.9 (11.6)	44.4 (6.9)	32.9 (0.5)	21.7 (−5.7)	11.3 (−11.5)	32.2 (0.1)
Mean minimum °F (°C)	−5.6 (−20.9)	−0.9 (−18.3)	11.3 (−11.5)	17.8 (−7.9)	27.2 (−2.7)	36.4 (2.4)	46.4 (8.0)	44.3 (6.8)	31.6 (−0.2)	19.6 (−6.9)	7.4 (−13.7)	−4.2 (−20.1)	−9.0 (−22.8)
Record low °F (°C)	−27 (−33)	−26 (−32)	−17 (−27)	−2 (−19)	18 (−8)	29 (−2)	34 (1)	32 (0)	13 (−11)	−1 (−18)	−6 (−21)	−26 (−32)	−27 (−33)
Average precipitation inches (mm)	0.55 (14)	0.56 (14)	0.53 (13)	0.77 (20)	1.04 (26)	0.59 (15)	0.54 (14)	0.93 (24)	1.37 (35)	1.15 (29)	0.51 (13)	0.57 (14)	9.11 (231)
Average snowfall inches (cm)	7.0 (18)	6.3 (16)	3.1 (7.9)	1.5 (3.8)	0.4 (1.0)	0.0 (0.0)	0.0 (0.0)	0.0 (0.0)	0.0 (0.0)	0.6 (1.5)	2.5 (6.4)	9.2 (23)	30.6 (78)
Average precipitation days (≥ 0.01 in)	4.7	4.6	3.7	4.8	5.6	3.7	3.6	4.9	5.5	4.5	3.5	4.0	53.1
Average snowy days (≥ 0.1 in)	3.8	3.1	1.8	1.2	0.1	0.0	0.0	0.0	0.0	0.4	1.5	3.2	15.1
Source: NOAA

== Demographics ==
Historical population
Census	Pop.	Note	%±
1920	434		—
1930	559		28.8%
1940	621		11.1%
1950	489		−21.3%
1990	511		—
2000	533		4.3%
2010	461		−13.5%
2020	491		6.5%
Source: U.S. Census Bureau

As of the census of 2000, there were 533 people, 170 households, and 139 families residing in the CDP. The population density was 76.0 people per square mile (29.4/km^{2}). There were 190 housing units at an average density of 27.1/sq mi (10.5/km^{2}). The racial makeup of the CDP was 85.18% White, 10.32% Native American, 0.19% Asian, 0.19% Pacific Islander, 0.56% from other races, and 3.56% from two or more races. Hispanic or Latino of any race were 2.63% of the population.

There were 170 households, out of which 44.1% had children under the age of 18 living with them, 70.6% were married couples living together, 9.4% had a female householder with no husband present, and 18.2% were non-families. 15.9% of all households were made up of individuals, and 9.4% had someone living alone who was 65 years of age or older. The average household size was 3.14 and the average family size was 3.52.

In the CDP, the population was spread out, with 35.5% under the age of 18, 8.3% from 18 to 24, 25.5% from 25 to 44, 19.5% from 45 to 64, and 11.3% who were 65 years of age or older. The median age was 31 years. For every 100 females, there were 96.0 males. For every 100 females age 18 and over, there were 95.5 males.

The median income for a household in the CDP was $38,214, and the median income for a family was $40,625. Males had a median income of $35,500 versus $25,000 for females. The per capita income for the CDP was $13,138. About 10.6% of families and 14.1% of the population were below the poverty line, including 16.7% of those under age 18 and 9.1% of those age 65 or over.

== See also ==
- List of census-designated places in Utah
- Neola North Fire
