= Fort Duchesne, Utah =

- CDP
- Location in Uintah County and the state of Utah
- Coordinates: 40°17′36″N 109°51′48″W
- Country: United States
- State: Utah
- County: Uintah

Area
  - Total: 7.6 sq mi (19.8 km^{2})
  - Land: 7.0 sq mi (18.2 km^{2})
  - Water: 0.66 sq mi (1.7 km^{2})
- Elevation: 4,990 ft (1,521 m)

Population (2020)
  - Total: 546
  - Density: 77.7/sq mi (30.0/km^{2})
- Time zone: UTC-7 (Mountain (MST))
  - Summer (DST): UTC-6 (MDT)
- ZIP code: 84026
- Area code: 435
- FIPS code: 49-26610
- GNIS feature ID: 1428039

Fort Duchesne /duːˈʃeɪn/ is a census-designated place (CDP) in Uintah County, Utah, United States. The population was 546 at the 2020 census, a decrease from the 2010 figure of 714.

Fort Duchesne was originally a fort, established by the United States Army in 1886 and closed in 1912. The community developed around it within the Uintah and Ouray Indian Reservation, established in 1864. Several bands of Ute were forced on to the reservation about 1880.

The headquarters of the Ute Indian Tribe are located here. Its reservation includes much of Uintah and nearby counties.

== Geography ==
According to the United States Census Bureau, the CDP has a total area of 7.7 square miles (19.8 km^{2}), of which 7.0 square miles (18.2 km^{2}) is land and 0.6 square mile (1.7 km^{2}) (8.36%) is water.

== Demographics ==
Historical population
| Census | Pop. | Note | %± |
|---|---|---|---|
| 1990 | 655 | | — |
| 2000 | 621 | | −5.2% |
| 2010 | 714 | | 15.0% |
| 2020 | 546 | | −23.5% |
Source: U.S. Census Bureau

Fort Duchesne CDP, Utah – Racial composition Note: the US Census treats Hispanic/Latino as an ethnic category. This table excludes Latinos from the racial categories and assigns them to a separate category. Hispanics/Latinos may be of any race.
| Race (NH = Non-Hispanic) | % 2020 | % 2010 | % 2000 | Pop 2020 | Pop 2010 | Pop 2000 |
|---|---|---|---|---|---|---|
| White alone (NH) | 7.3% | 3.4% | 5.2% | 40 | 24 | 32 |
| Black alone (NH) | 0% | 0.1% | 0% | 0 | 1 | 0 |
| American Indian alone (NH) | 83.9% | 91.9% | 85.5% | 458 | 656 | 531 |
| Asian alone (NH) | 0% | 0.1% | 0.2% | 0 | 1 | 1 |
| Pacific Islander alone (NH) | 0% | 0% | 0% | 0 | 0 | 0 |
| Other race alone (NH) | 0% | 0% | 0% | 0 | 0 | 0 |
| Multiracial (NH) | 5.3% | 2% | 4% | 29 | 14 | 25 |
| Hispanic/Latino (any race) | 3.5% | 2.5% | 5.2% | 19 | 18 | 32 |

The detailed ancestries reported in 2020 were Ute Indian Tribe of the Uintah and Ouray Reservation (39.6%) and Ute (32.6%).

| Languages (2000) | Percent |
|---|---|
| Spoke English at home | 75.82% |
| Spoke Colorado River Numic at home | 19.86% |
| Spoke Shoshoni at home | 2.59% |
| Spoke Navajo at home | 1.73% |

As of the census of 2000, there were 621 people, 165 households, and 138 families residing in the CDP. The population density was 88.5 people per square mile (34.2/km^{2}). There were 183 housing units at an average density of 26.1/sq mi (10.1/km^{2}). The racial makeup of the CDP was 5.48% White, 90.18% Native American, 0.16% Asian, 0.16% from other races, and 4.03% from two or more races. Hispanic or Latino of any race were 5.15% of the population.

There were 165 households, out of which 46.1% had children under the age of 18 living with them, 30.3% were married couples living together, 43.0% had a female householder with no husband present, and 15.8% were non-families. 13.3% of all households were made up of individuals, and 1.2% had someone living alone who was 65 years of age or older. The average household size was 3.61 and the average family size was 3.78.

In the CDP, the population was spread out, with 40.1% under the age of 18, 11.4% from 18 to 24, 29.8% from 25 to 44, 14.7% from 45 to 64, and 4.0% who were 65 years of age or older. The median age was 24 years. For every 100 females, there were 95.9 males. For every 100 females age 18 and over, there were 82.4 males.

The median income for a household in the CDP was $18,750, and the median income for a family was $14,688. Males had a median income of $30,714 versus $20,750 for females. The per capita income for the CDP was $6,466. About 52.1% of families and 54.6% of the population were below the poverty line, including 57.4% of those under age 18 and 52.4% of those age 65 or over.

== Climate ==
Fort Duchesne has one of the largest temperature differences between the summer, where highs commonly reach 90 and above, and winter, where lows commonly reach below 0. As a result, Fort Duchesne has a cold-semi arid near cold desert climate instead of a subarctic climate despite the frigid winters. Precipitation, although very minimal, can be seen throughout the year with the late summer and early fall months seeing more than any other month of the year. However, there isn't a month that averages more than 1 inch.

Climate data for Fort Duchesne, Utah (1991–2020 normals, extremes 1887–1893, 1902–present)
| Month | Jan | Feb | Mar | Apr | May | Jun | Jul | Aug | Sep | Oct | Nov | Dec | Year |
|---|---|---|---|---|---|---|---|---|---|---|---|---|---|
| Record high °F (°C) | 60 (16) | 67 (19) | 82 (28) | 87 (31) | 95 (35) | 105 (41) | 107 (42) | 106 (41) | 100 (38) | 89 (32) | 76 (24) | 72 (22) | 107 (42) |
| Mean maximum °F (°C) | 44.0 (6.7) | 52.9 (11.6) | 69.1 (20.6) | 80.5 (26.9) | 87.3 (30.7) | 97.3 (36.3) | 99.9 (37.7) | 98.6 (37.0) | 93.4 (34.1) | 80.7 (27.1) | 63.4 (17.4) | 48.6 (9.2) | 101.4 (38.6) |
| Mean daily maximum °F (°C) | 28.6 (−1.9) | 37.5 (3.1) | 53.2 (11.8) | 63.2 (17.3) | 73.0 (22.8) | 84.6 (29.2) | 92.0 (33.3) | 89.2 (31.8) | 79.2 (26.2) | 64.4 (18.0) | 47.2 (8.4) | 31.7 (−0.2) | 62.0 (16.7) |
| Daily mean °F (°C) | 16.7 (−8.5) | 25.2 (−3.8) | 38.8 (3.8) | 47.2 (8.4) | 56.3 (13.5) | 65.9 (18.8) | 73.6 (23.1) | 71.0 (21.7) | 61.8 (16.6) | 48.7 (9.3) | 34.3 (1.3) | 20.6 (−6.3) | 46.7 (8.2) |
| Mean daily minimum °F (°C) | 4.7 (−15.2) | 12.9 (−10.6) | 24.4 (−4.2) | 31.1 (−0.5) | 39.5 (4.2) | 47.2 (8.4) | 55.1 (12.8) | 52.9 (11.6) | 44.4 (6.9) | 33.1 (0.6) | 21.4 (−5.9) | 9.5 (−12.5) | 31.3 (−0.4) |
| Mean minimum °F (°C) | −9.0 (−22.8) | −2.2 (−19.0) | 10.6 (−11.9) | 19.9 (−6.7) | 28.1 (−2.2) | 37.0 (2.8) | 44.6 (7.0) | 44.3 (6.8) | 33.5 (0.8) | 20.1 (−6.6) | 9.6 (−12.4) | −7.3 (−21.8) | −12.5 (−24.7) |
| Record low °F (°C) | −40 (−40) | −36 (−38) | −15 (−26) | 3 (−16) | 17 (−8) | 21 (−6) | 26 (−3) | 30 (−1) | 20 (−7) | −1 (−18) | −19 (−28) | −39 (−39) | −40 (−40) |
| Average precipitation inches (mm) | 0.38 (9.7) | 0.44 (11) | 0.40 (10) | 0.45 (11) | 0.63 (16) | 0.42 (11) | 0.31 (7.9) | 0.62 (16) | 0.81 (21) | 0.86 (22) | 0.33 (8.4) | 0.36 (9.1) | 6.01 (153) |
| Average precipitation days (≥ 0.01 in) | 4.5 | 4.4 | 2.9 | 3.5 | 4.3 | 2.4 | 3.4 | 4.6 | 3.8 | 4.1 | 2.8 | 4.0 | 44.7 |
Source: NOAA

== Notable residents ==
- Danny Lopez, world champion professional boxer and member of the International Boxing Hall of Fame, Ernie Lopez's brother
- Ernie Lopez, top ranked professional boxer, Danny Lopez's brother

== See also ==
- List of census-designated places in Utah
