= Bonanza, Utah =

Bonanza
- CDP
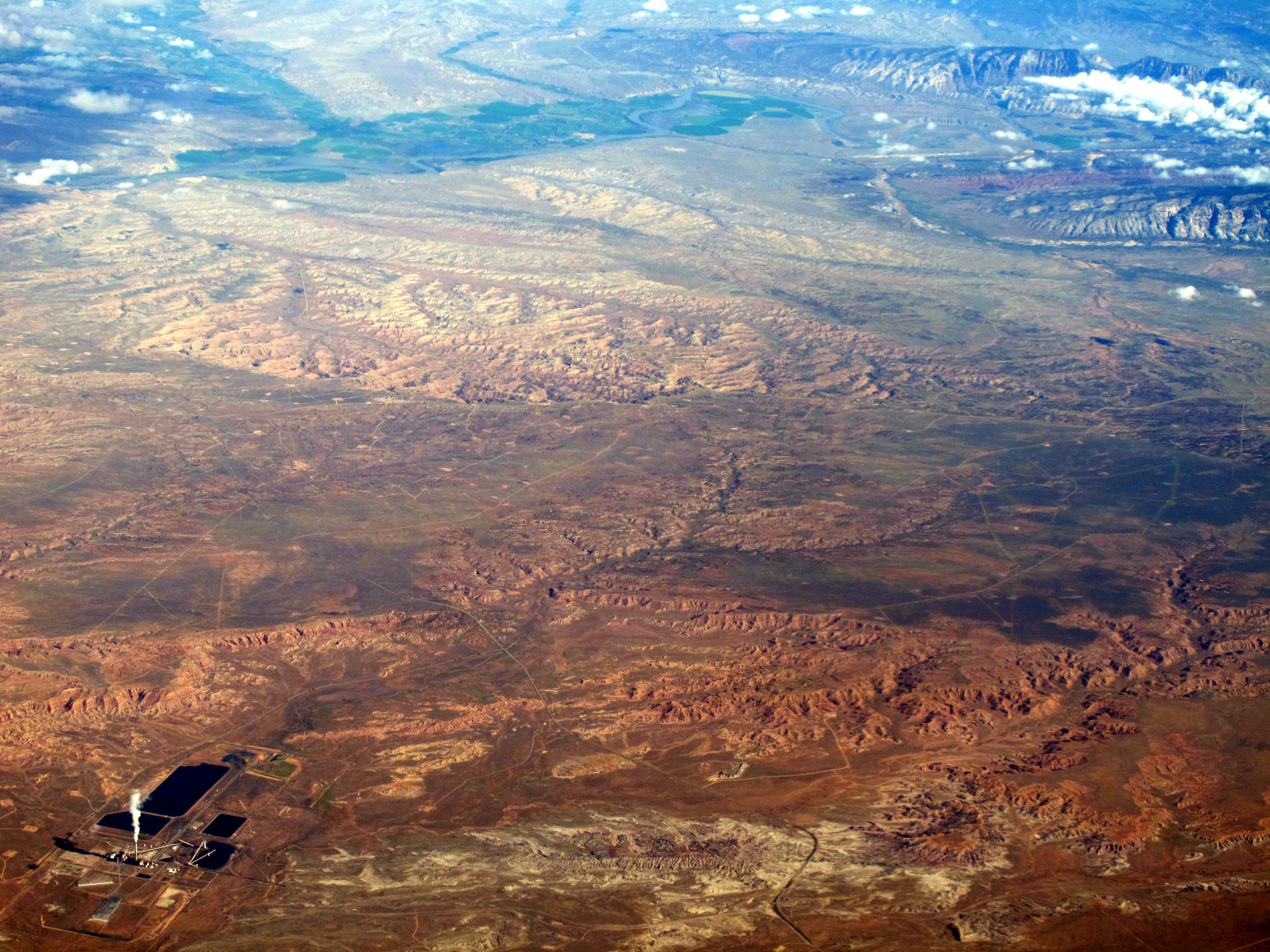
- Bonanza Power Plant

- Location in Uintah County and the state of Utah
- Coordinates: 40°01′49″N 109°11′18″W
- Country: United States
- State: Utah
- County: Uintah
- Settled: 1888
- Named after: Rich Gilsonite deposits
- Elevation: 5,466 ft (1,666 m)

Population (2020)
  - Total: 0
- Time zone: UTC-5 (Mountain (MST))
  - Summer (DST): UTC-4 (MDT)
- ZIP code: 84008
- Area code: 435
- GNIS feature ID: 2584757

Bonanza is a census-designated place in eastern Uintah County, Utah, United States. The name refers to a rich mineral strike.

Near the community is a coal-fired power plant owned by Deseret Power Electric Cooperative. Bonanza is also in the area of the Colorado Plateau where oil drilling and extraction takes place from oil shale and other fossil fuel deposits. As of the 2020 census, Bonanza had a population of 0.

== History ==
Bonanza was established in 1888. The basis for establishing the community was a discovery of Gilsonite, a natural asphalt substance.

== Geography ==
Bonanza is 212 miles (341 km) southeast of Salt Lake City and is located on State Route 45.

=== Climate ===
According to the Köppen Climate Classification system, Bonanza has a semi-arid climate, abbreviated "BSk" on climate maps.

== See also ==
- List of census-designated places in Utah
