= Uintah Lake =

- Location within Utah
- Location: Duchesne County, Utah
- Coordinates: 40°42′37″N 110°45′53″W
- Type: lake
- Max. length: 1,200 feet (370 m)
- Max. width: 600 feet (180 m)
- Surface elevation: 10,945 feet (3,336 m)

Uintah Lake is one of many lakes in Uinta Mountains in Duchesne County, Utah, United States. The lake is at an elevation of 10,945 feet (3,336 m).

The lake has a rough oval shape about 1,200 feet (370 m) long by 600 feet (180 m) wide oriented east–west. The lake lies just east of a northwest–southeast trending ridgeline with an unnamed peak about 1,000 feet (300 m) to the south at an elevation of 11,834 feet (3,607 m) and another about 3,000 feet (910 m) to the northwest at an elevation of 12,070 feet (3,680 m). Spread Eagle Peak on the Duchesne-Summit county line lies 1.5 miles (2.4 km) to the northwest and has an elevation of 12,540 feet (3,820 m).

Although it has a slightly different spelling, the name of the lake has the same etymology as the mountain range in which it is located.
