= Mack, Colorado =

Unincorporated community in Mesa County, CO, USA

- Unincorporated community
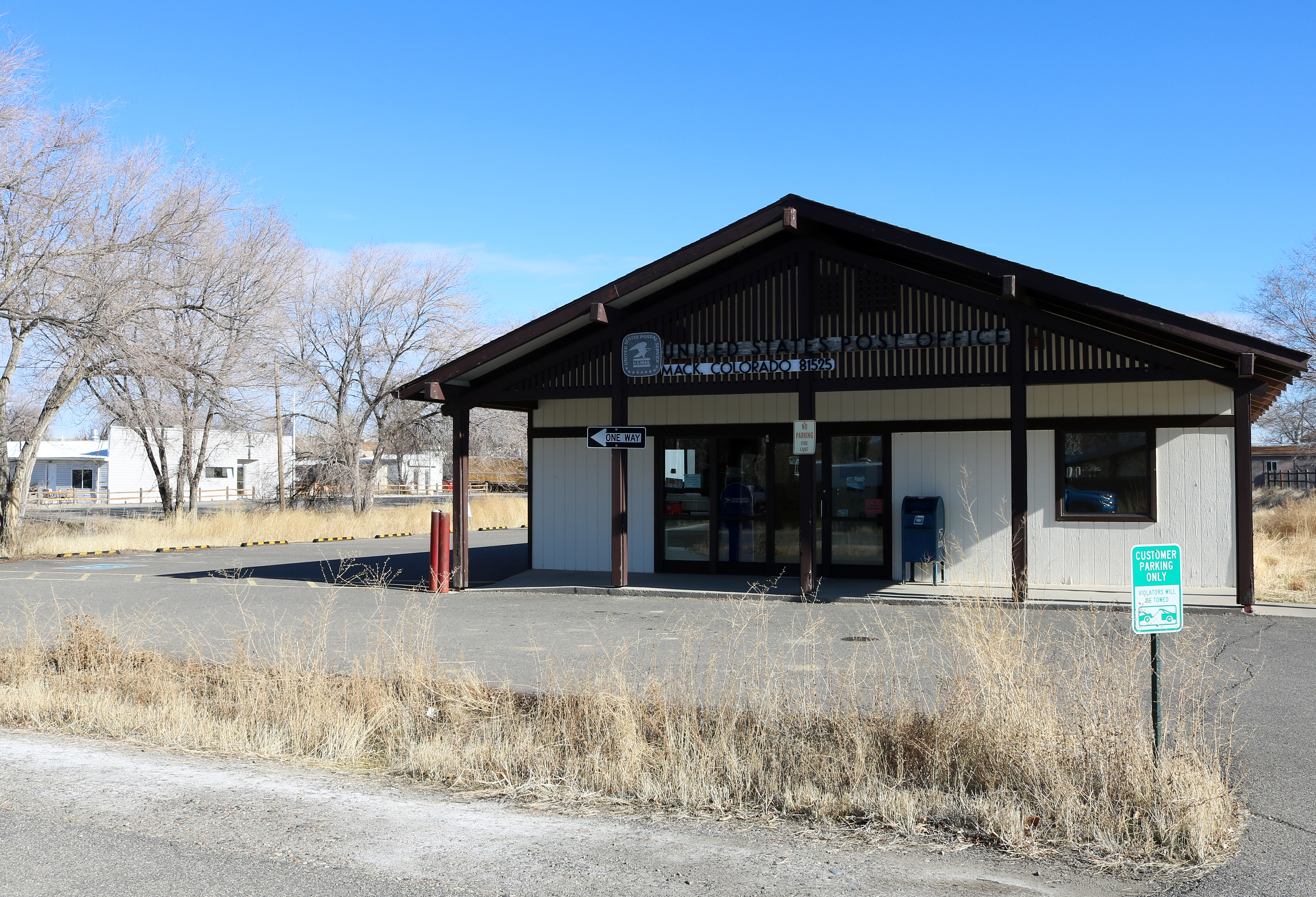
- Post office in Mack

- Location within Colorado Location within the United States
- Coordinates: 39°13′26″N 108°51′54″W
- Country: United States
- State: Colorado
- County: Mesa
- Elevation: 4,524 ft (1,379 m)
- Time zone: UTC-7 (MST)
  - Summer (DST): UTC-6 (MDT)
- ZIP code: 81525
- Area code: 970
- GNIS feature ID: 174372

Mack is an unincorporated community that is located approximately ten miles east of the Colorado/Utah border in Mesa County, Colorado, United States. Mack is part of the Grand Junction Metropolitan Statistical Area.

== Description ==
A post office called Mack has been in operation since 1904. It was assigned the ZIP Code 81525. The community was named after John W. Mack, a businessperson in the asphalt industry.

The Country Jam Ranch is located near the town of Mack and is known for being a Music Festival Destination. This is a permanent festival site created for music festivals, including Country Jam, an event that has been held since 1992 and one that draws thousands of country music fans to the area.

== See also ==
- Grand Junction Metropolitan Statistical Area
- Old Spanish National Historic Trail
