= Asphaltite =

Form of asphalt

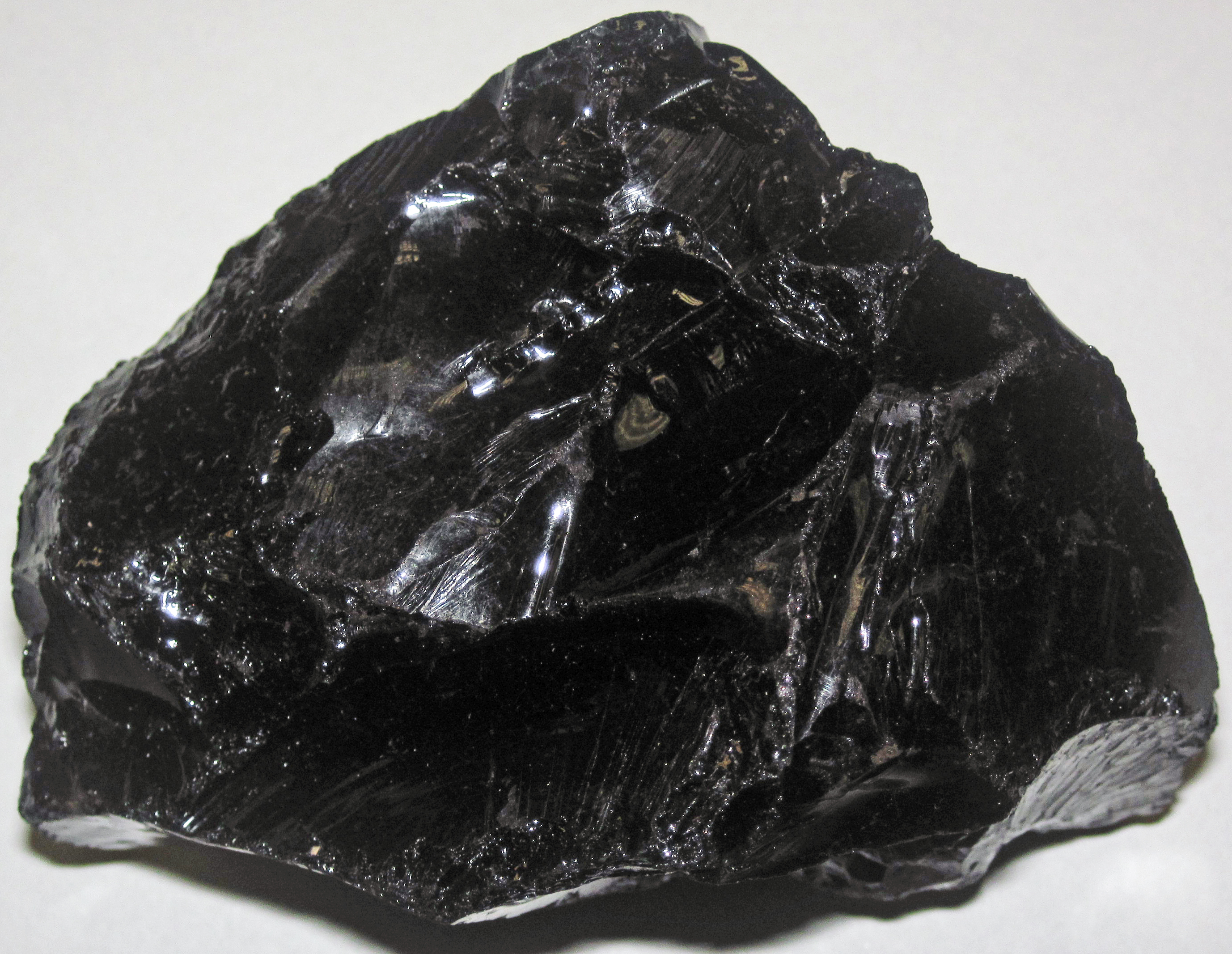
Asphaltite from the Uinta Formation, Bonanza, Utah

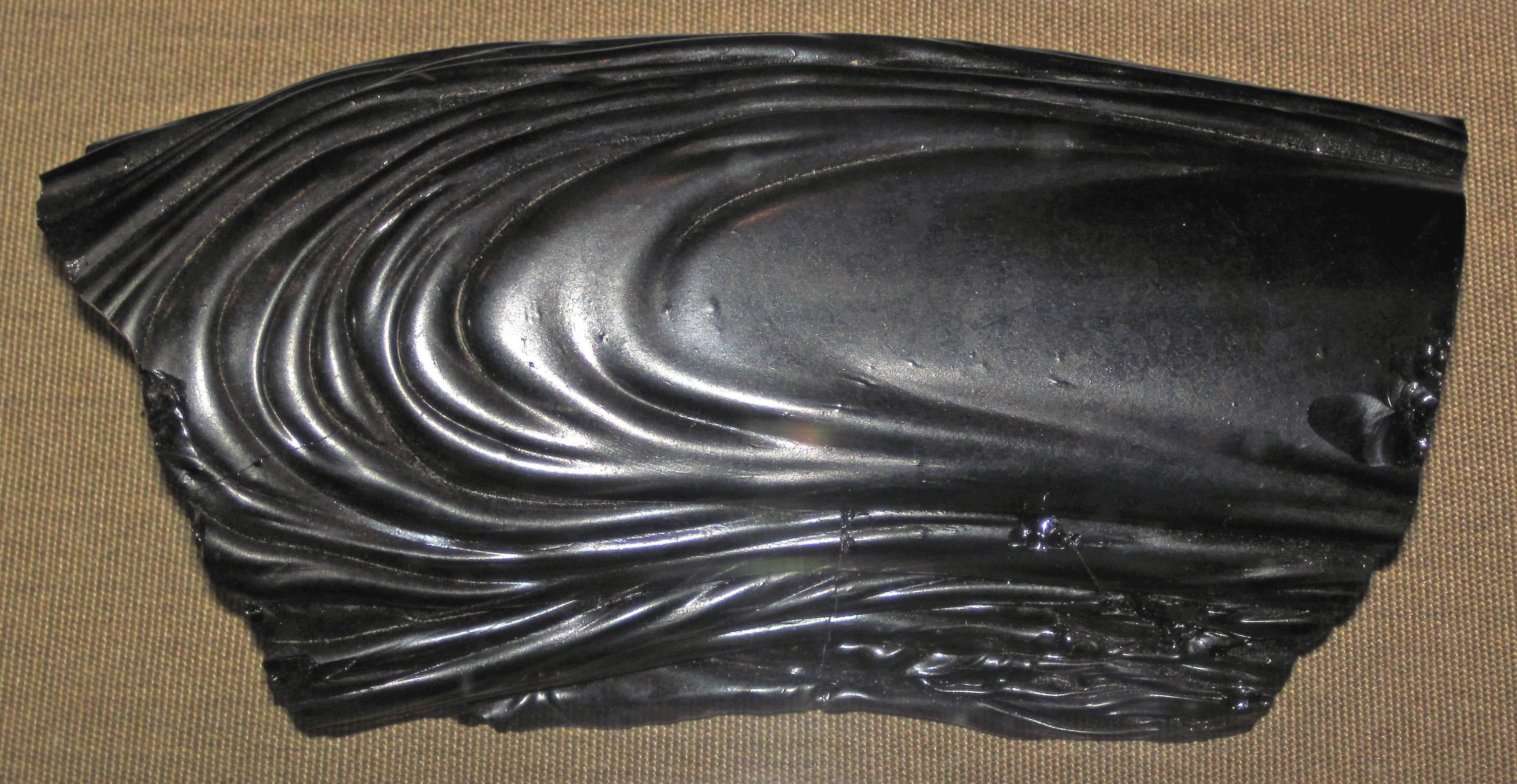
Asphaltite pahoehoe paralava. This remarkable specimen is from asphaltite which was melted in a wildfire in 2012. While molten, it developed a smooth to ropey top surface much like pahoehoe basalt lava. Exhibit at the Utah Field House of Natural History.

Asphaltite (also known as uintahite, asphaltum, gilsonite or oil sands) is a naturally occurring soluble solid hydrocarbon, a form of asphalt (or bitumen) with a relatively high melting temperature. Its large-scale production occurs in the Uinta Basin of Utah and Colorado, United States.

Although the substance has been historically mined in the Uintah Basin, resources are being discovered and mined more recently in other countries such as Colombia and Iran. Asphaltite is mined in underground shafts and resembles shiny black obsidian. Discovered in the 1860s, it was first marketed as a lacquer, electrical insulator, and waterproofing compound approximately 25 years later by Samuel H. Gilson.

== History ==
Asphaltite was discovered in the 1860s. By 1888 Samuel H. Gilson had started a company to mine the substance, but soon discovered the vein was on the Uintah and Ouray Indian Reservation. Under great political pressure Congress removed some 7,000 acres (28 km^{2}) from the reservation on May 24, 1888 to allow mining to proceed legally. Asphaltite mining became the first large commercial enterprise in the Uintah Basin.

Mining asphaltite during World War II was manual, using a six-pound pick, then shoveling the ore into 200 pound sacks, which were sewn by hand.

Gilsonite-brand uintahite's earliest applications included paints for buggies and emulsions for beer-vat lining. It was used by Ford Motor Company as a principal component of the japan black lacquer used on most of the Ford Model T cars.

== Composition ==
Asphaltite is categorized as a soluble material in oil solutions such as carbon disulphide or TCE (trichloroethylene). A major component of asphaltite is carbon; it also contains several other elements including nitrogen and sulfur and some volatile compounds.

== Reserves and uses ==
Asphaltite reserves are distributed globally, especially within basins. It has also been found on the dwarf planet Ceres and is predicted to exist on the Martian moon Phobos.

Asphaltite is used in more than 160 products, primarily in dark-colored printing inks and paints, oil well drilling muds and cements, asphalt modifiers, foundry sand additives, and a wide variety of chemical products. The trademark "Gilsonite", registered in 1921, belongs to the American Gilsonite Company which filed for bankruptcy in October 2016 and, after accepting re-organization, emerged in January 2017.

Asphaltite is a common modifier for bitumen in asphalt. Blending asphaltite with bitumen increases the strength and resistance of pavements. This application is practised in countries such as China, India and Iran. Known as asfaltit in Turkish, it is burnt in Şırnak Silopi power station, a coal fired power station in Turkey.
