= Utah =

U.S. state

- State
- Flag Seal
- Nicknames: "Beehive State" (official), "The Mormon State", "Deseret"
- Motto: Industry
- Anthem: "Utah...This Is the Place" "Utah, We Love Thee"
- Location of Utah within the United States
- Country: United States
- Before statehood: Utah Territory
- Admitted to the Union: January 4, 1896 (45th)
- Capital (and largest city): Salt Lake City
- Largest county or equivalent: Salt Lake
- Largest metro and urban areas: Salt Lake City

Government
  - Governor: Spencer Cox (R)
  - Lieutenant Governor: Deidre Henderson (R)
- Legislature: State Legislature
  - Upper house: State Senate
  - Lower house: House of Representatives
- Judiciary: Utah Supreme Court
- U.S. senators: Mike Lee (R); John Curtis (R)
- U.S. House delegation: 1: Blake Moore (R); 2: Celeste Maloy (R); 3: Mike Kennedy (R); 4: Burgess Owens (R) (list)

Area
  - Total: 84,899 sq mi (219,887 km^{2})
  - Land: 82,147 sq mi (212,761 km^{2})
  - Water: 2,755 sq mi (7,136 km^{2}) 3.25%
  - Rank: 13th

Dimensions
  - Length: 350 mi (560 km)
  - Width: 270 mi (435 km)
- Elevation: 6,100 ft (1,860 m)
- Highest elevation (Kings Peak (Note: Elevation adjusted to North American Vertical Datum of 1988)): 13,518 ft (4,120.3 m)
- Lowest elevation (Beaver Dam Wash at Arizona border): 2,180 ft (664.4 m)

Population (2025)
  - Total: ▲3,538,904
  - Rank: 30th
  - Density: 36.6/sq mi (14.12/km^{2})
  - Rank: 41st
  - Median household income: $93,400 (2023)
  - Income rank: 8th
- Demonym: Utahn (Note: In 2025, the Utah Legislature voted to make Utahn the official state demonym. Prior sources occasionally also list Utahan.)

Language
  - Official language: English
- Time zone: UTC−07:00 (Mountain)
  - Summer (DST): UTC−06:00 (MDT)
- USPS abbreviation: UT
- ISO 3166 code: US-UT
- Traditional abbreviation: Ut.
- Latitude: 37° N to 42° N
- Longitude: 109°3′ W to 114°3′ W
- Website: utah.gov

State symbols of Utah
List of state symbols
- Flag of Utah

- Seal of Utah

- Coat of arms of Utah
- Emblem: Beehive

Living insignia
- Bird: California gull
- Fish: Bonneville cutthroat trout
- Flower: Sego lily
- Grass: Indian ricegrass
- Insect: Western honey bee
- Mammal: Rocky Mountain elk
- Mushroom: Porcini
- Reptile: Gila monster
- Tree: Quaking aspen

Inanimate insignia
- Dance: Square dance
- Dinosaur: Utahraptor
- Firearm: Browning M1911
- Fossil: Allosaurus
- Gemstone: Topaz
- Mineral: Copper
- Rock: Coal
- Tartan: Utah State Centennial Tartan

State route marker

State quarter
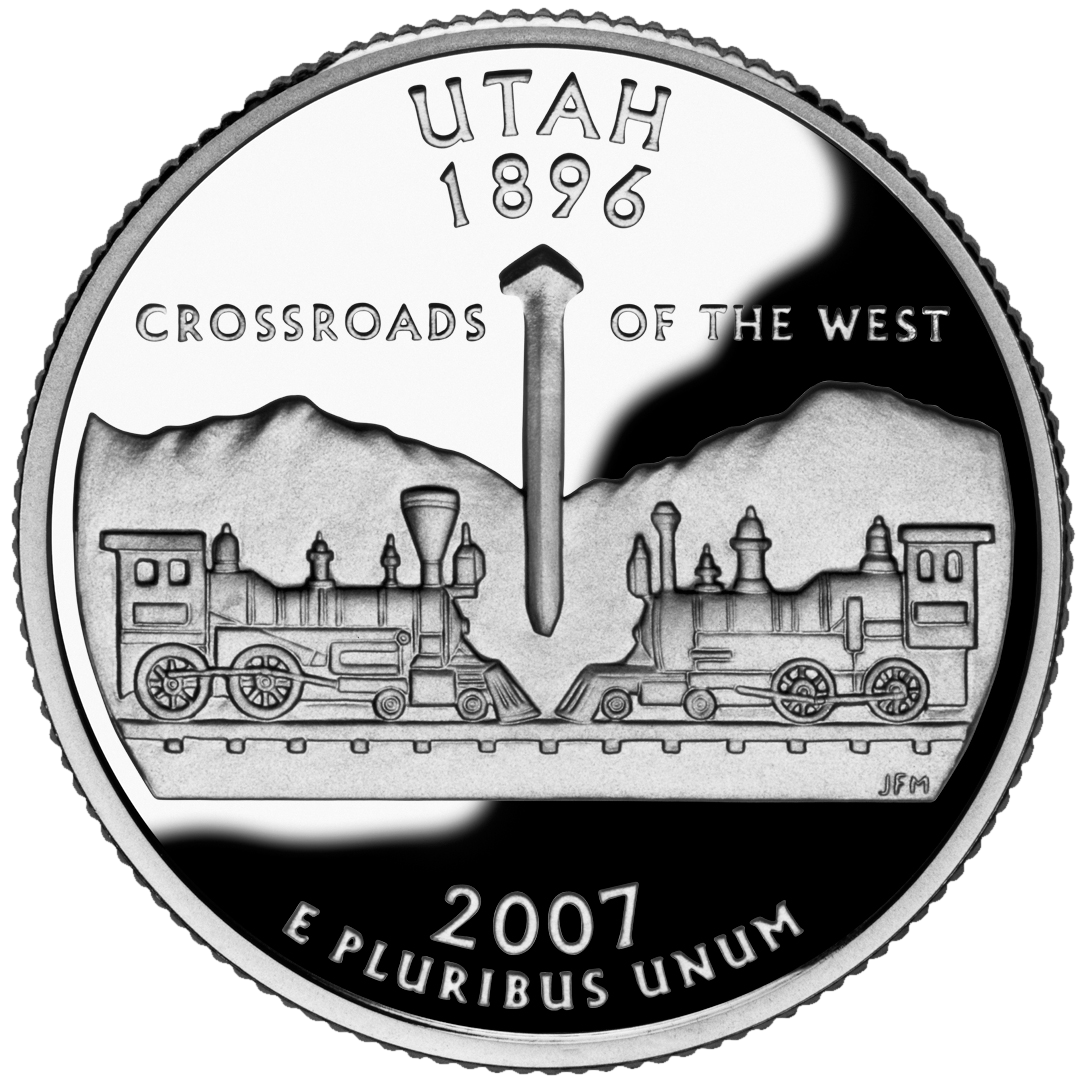
- Released in 2007

Utah (Note: /ˈjuːtɑː/ YOO-tah, /ˈjuːtɔː/ YOO-taw) (Note: Navajo: Áshįįh Biiʼtó Hahoodzo, pronounced [ɑ́ʃĩːh piːʔtxó hɑ̀hòːtsò]) is a landlocked state in the Mountain West subregion of the Western United States. It is one of the Four Corners states, sharing a border with Arizona, Colorado, and New Mexico. It also borders Wyoming to the northeast, Idaho to the north, and Nevada to the west. In comparison to all the U.S. states and territories, Utah, with a population of just over three million, is the 13th-largest by area, the 30th-most populous, and the 11th-least densely populated. Urban development is mostly concentrated in two regions: the Wasatch Front in the north-central part of the state, which includes the state capital, Salt Lake City, and is home to roughly two-thirds of the population; and Washington County in the southwest, which has approximately 180,000 residents. Most of the western half of Utah lies in the Great Basin.

Utah has been inhabited for thousands of years by various Indigenous peoples, such as the ancient Puebloans, the Navajo, and the Ute. The first Europeans to arrive – in the mid-16th century – were the Spanish. Because of the region's challenging geography and harsh climate, it only became a peripheral part of New Spain (and later of Mexico). Even while it was Mexican territory, many of the Utah region's earliest European settlers were from the United States; notable among these were Mormons who were fleeing marginalization and persecution in the United States and arrived via the so-called Mormon Trail. In 1848, after the Mexican–American War, the region was annexed by the U.S., becoming part of the Utah Territory, which included what later became Colorado and Nevada. Disputes between the dominant Mormon community and Congress delayed Utah's admission as a state: in 1896, after it agreed to outlaw polygamy, it was admitted as the 45th state.

People from Utah are known as Utahns. Slightly over half of all Utahns are Mormons, the vast majority of whom are members of the Church of Jesus Christ of Latter-day Saints (LDS Church), which has its world headquarters in Salt Lake City; Utah is the only state where a majority of the population belongs to a single church. The LDS Church greatly influences Utah's culture, politics, and daily life. However, since the 1990s, Utah has become both more religiously diverse and more secular.

Utah has a highly diversified economy, with major sectors including transportation, education, information technology and research, government services, mining, multi-level marketing, and tourism. Utah has been one of the fastest growing states since 2000, with the 2020 U.S. census confirming the fastest population growth in the nation since 2010. St. George was the fastest-growing metropolitan area in the United States from 2000 to 2005. It has the 12th-highest median average income and the least income inequality of any U.S. state. Over time and influenced by climate change, droughts in Utah have been increasing in frequency and severity, putting a further strain on Utah's water security and impacting the state's economy.

== Etymology ==
Utah, now usually shortened to Ute, is the English name of an Indian tribe native to the region. It represents a borrowing of the Spanish Yuta, recorded from the 17th century onwards. The ultimate source of the name is uncertain; it lacks a counterpart in the Ute language (the Utes' name for themselves being Núuchi-u) and was thus presumably taken from the language of a neighboring people. It is commonly said to mean "people of the mountains".

== History ==
=== Pre-Columbian ===
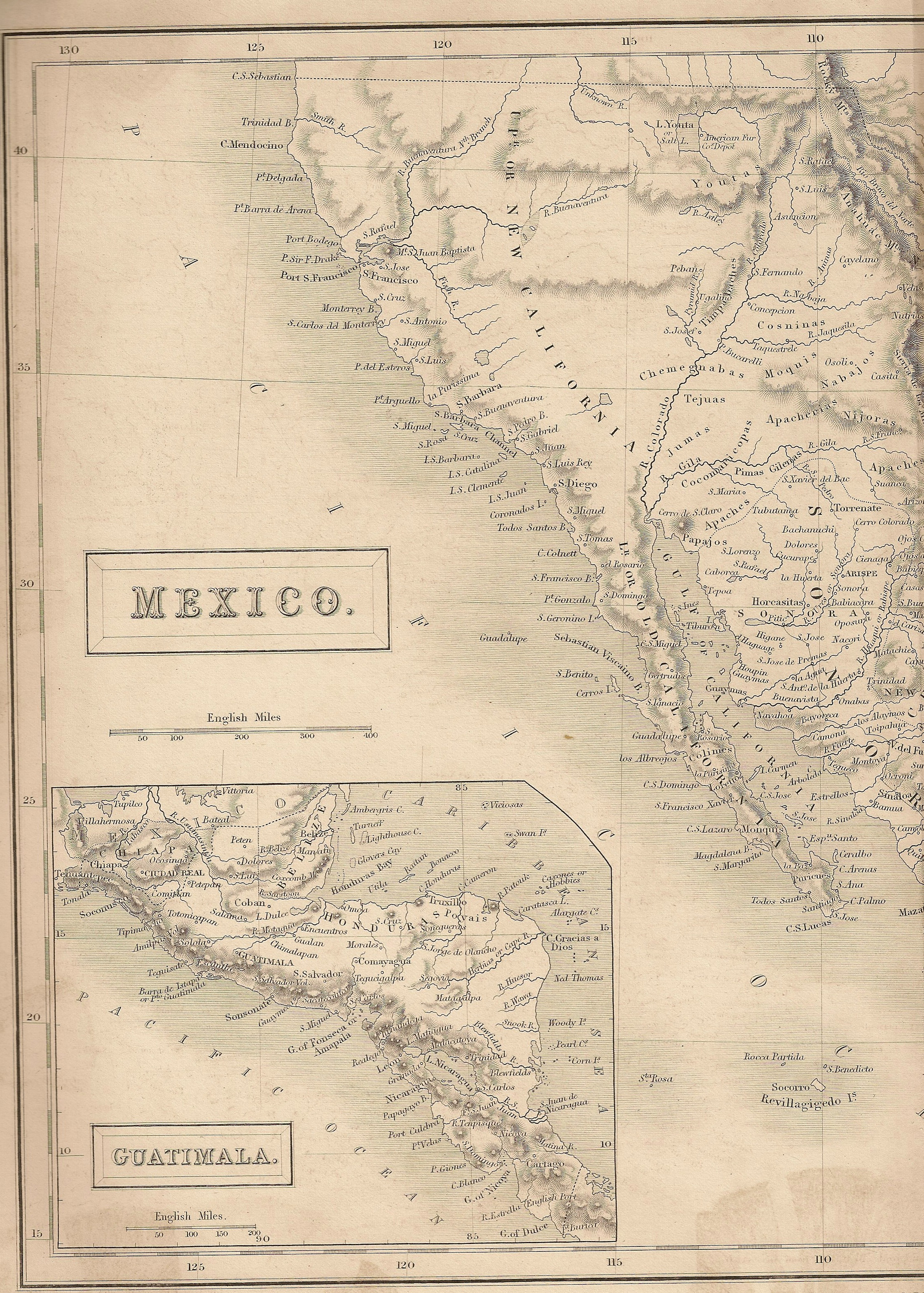
Map showing Utah in 1838 when it was part of Mexico, Britannica 7th edition

Thousands of years before the arrival of Europeans, the Ancestral Puebloans and the Fremont people lived in what is now known as Utah, some of which spoke languages of the Uto-Aztecan group. Ancestral Pueblo peoples built their homes through excavations in mountains, and the Fremont people built houses of straw before disappearing from the region around the 15th century.

Another group of Native Americans, the Navajo, settled in the region around the 18th century. In the mid-18th century, other Uto-Aztecan tribes, including the Goshute, the Paiute, the Shoshone, and the Ute people, also settled in the region. These five groups were present when the first European explorers arrived.

=== Spanish exploration (1540) ===
The southern Utah region was explored by the Spanish in 1540, led by Francisco Vázquez de Coronado while looking for the legendary Cíbola. A group led by two Catholic priests—sometimes called the Domínguez–Escalante expedition—left Santa Fe in 1776, hoping to find a route to the coast of California. The expedition traveled as far north as Utah Lake and encountered the native residents. The Spanish made further explorations in the region but were not interested in colonizing the area because of its desert nature. In 1821, the year Mexico achieved its independence from Spain, the region became known as part of its territory of Alta California.

European trappers and fur traders explored some areas of Utah in the early 19th century from Canada and the United States. The city of Provo, Utah, was named for one Étienne Provost, who visited the area in 1825. The city of Ogden, Utah, was named after Peter Skene Ogden, a Canadian explorer who traded furs in the Weber Valley.

In late 1824, Jim Bridger became the first known English-speaking person to sight the Great Salt Lake. Due to the high salinity of its waters, he thought he had found the Pacific Ocean; he subsequently learned this body of water was a giant salt lake. After the discovery of the lake, hundreds of American and Canadian traders and trappers established trading posts in the region. In the 1830s, thousands of migrants traveling from the Eastern United States to the American West began to make stops in the region of the Great Salt Lake, then known as Lake Youta.

=== Latter Day Saint settlement (1847) ===
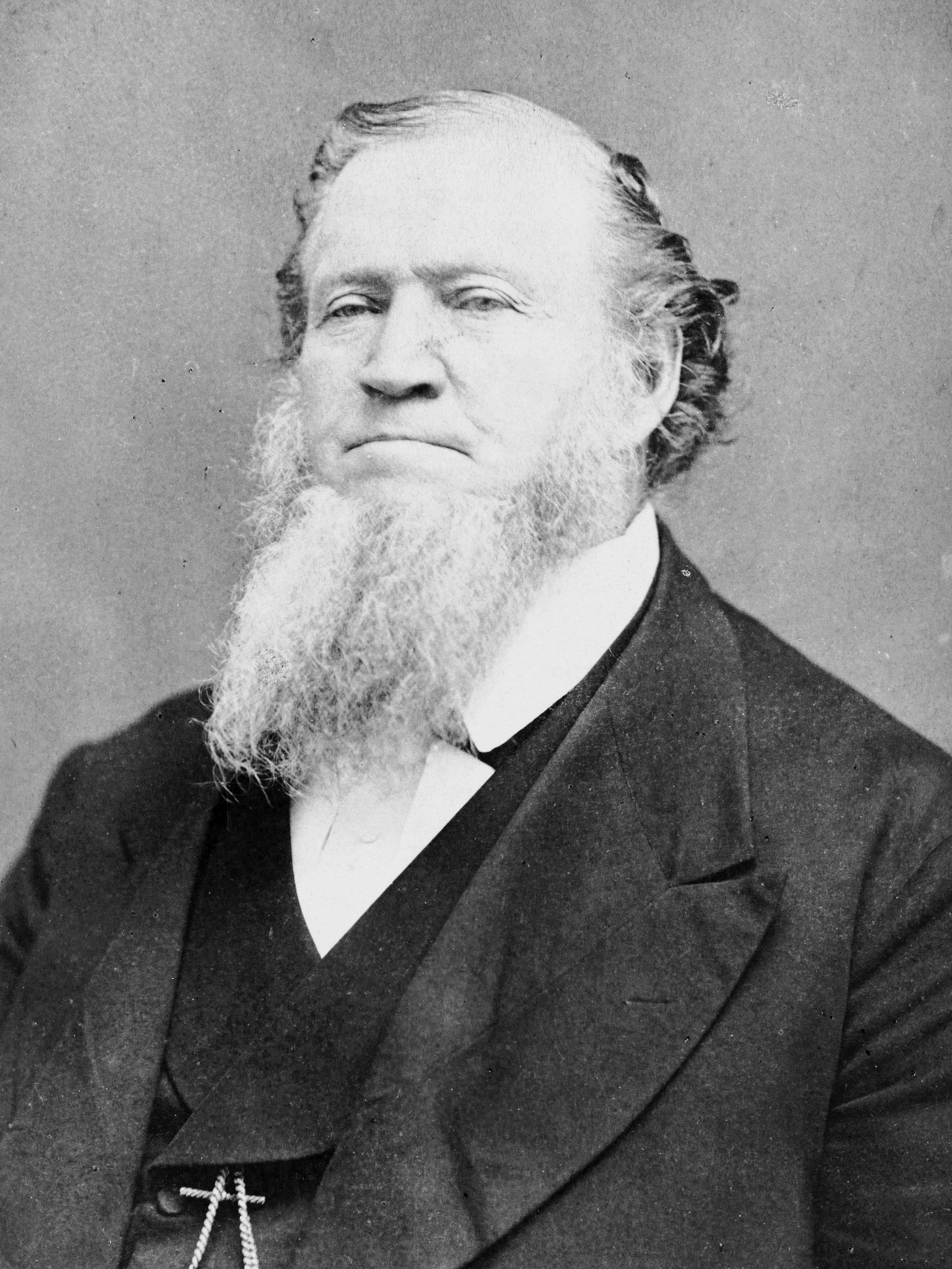
Brigham Young led the first Mormon pioneers to the Great Salt Lake.

Following the death of Joseph Smith in 1844, Brigham Young, as president of the Quorum of the Twelve, became the leader of the LDS Church in Nauvoo, Illinois. To address the growing conflicts between his people and their neighbors, Young agreed with Illinois Governor Thomas Ford in October 1845 that the Mormons would leave by the following year.

Young and the first group of Mormon pioneers reached the Salt Lake Valley on July 24, 1847. Over the next 22 years, more than 70,000 pioneers crossed the plains and settled in Utah. For the first few years, Brigham Young and the thousands of early settlers of Salt Lake City struggled to survive. The arid desert land was deemed desirable by the Mormons as a place where they could practice their religion without harassment.

Settlers buried thirty-six Native Americans in one grave after an outbreak of measles occurred during the winter of 1847.

The first group of settlers brought three African slaves with them, making Utah the only place in the western United States to have African slavery. The three slaves, Green Flake, Hark Lay, and Oscar Crosby, came west with the first group of settlers in 1847.

Utah was a Mexican territory when the first pioneers arrived in 1847. Early in the Mexican–American War in late 1846, the United States had taken control of New Mexico and California. The entire Southwest became U.S. territory upon the signing of the Treaty of Guadalupe Hidalgo, February 2, 1848. The treaty was ratified by the United States Senate on March 11. Learning that California and New Mexico were applying for statehood, the settlers of the Utah area (originally having planned to petition for territorial status) applied for statehood with an ambitious plan for a State of Deseret.

The Mormon settlements provided pioneers for other settlements in the West. Salt Lake City became the hub of a "far-flung commonwealth" of Mormon settlements. With new church converts coming from the East and around the world, Church leaders often assigned groups of church members as missionaries to establish other settlements throughout the West. They developed irrigation to support fairly large pioneer populations along Utah's Wasatch front (Salt Lake City, Bountiful and Weber Valley, and Provo and Utah Valley). Throughout the remainder of the 19th century, Mormon pioneers established hundreds of other settlements in Utah, Idaho, Nevada, Arizona, Wyoming, California, Canada, and Mexico—including in Las Vegas, Nevada; Franklin, Idaho (the first European settlement in Idaho); San Bernardino, California; Mesa, Arizona; Star Valley, Wyoming; and Carson Valley, Nevada.

Prominent settlements in Utah included St. George, Logan, and Manti (where settlers completed the LDS Church's first three temples in Utah, each started after but finished many years before the larger and better-known temple built in Salt Lake City was completed in 1893), as well as Parowan, Cedar City, Bluff, Moab, Vernal, Fillmore (which served as the territorial capital between 1850 and 1856), Nephi, Levan, Spanish Fork, Springville, Provo Bench (now Orem), Pleasant Grove, American Fork, Lehi, Sandy, Murray, Jordan, Centerville, Farmington, Huntsville, Kaysville, Grantsville, Tooele, Roy, Brigham City, and many other smaller towns and settlements. Young had an expansionist view of the territory that he and the Mormon pioneers were settling, calling it Deseret—which according to the Book of Mormon was an ancient word for "honeybee". This is symbolized by the beehive on the Utah flag, and the state's motto, "Industry".

=== Utah Territory (1850–1896) ===
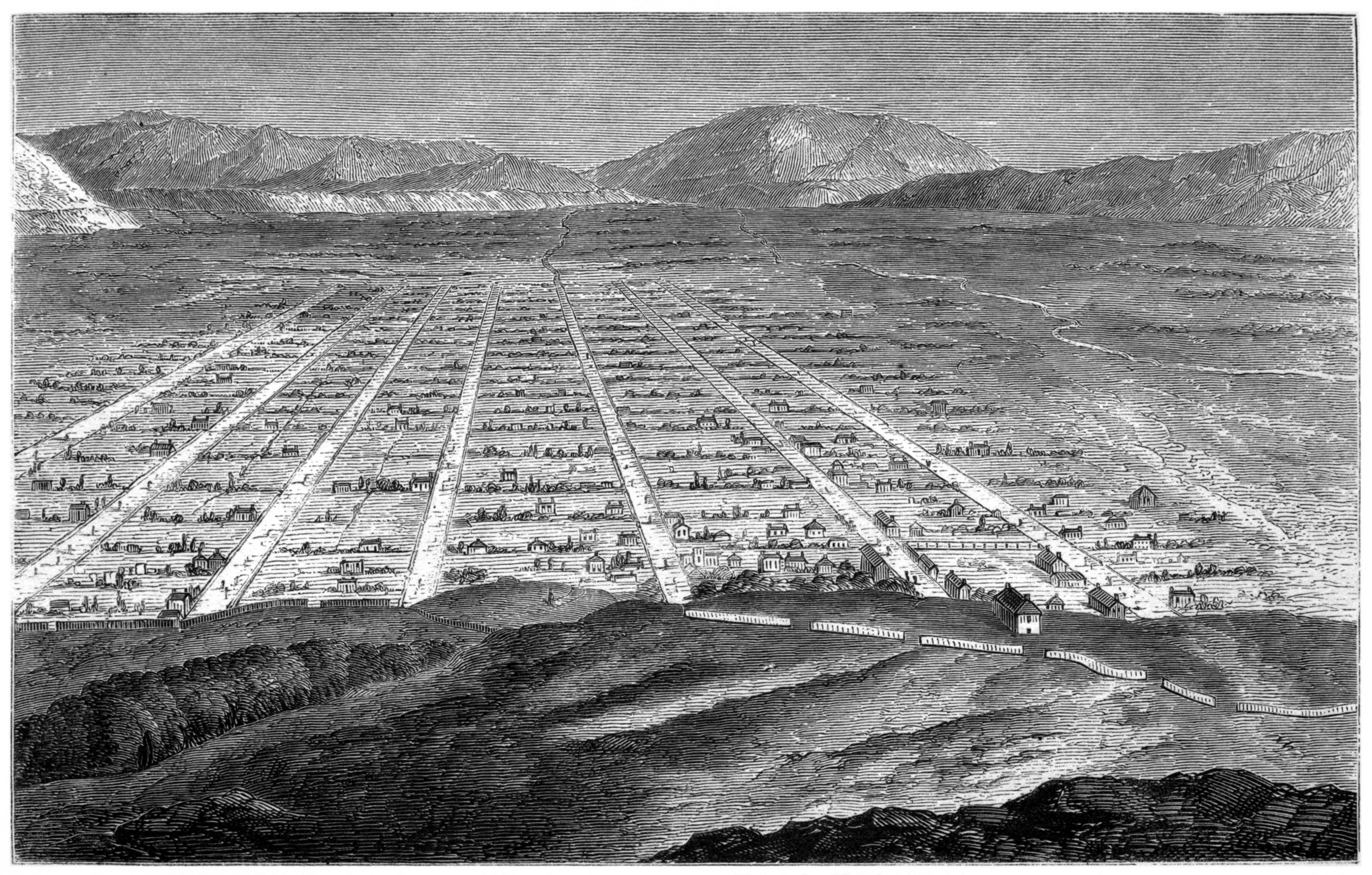
A sketch of Salt Lake City in 1860

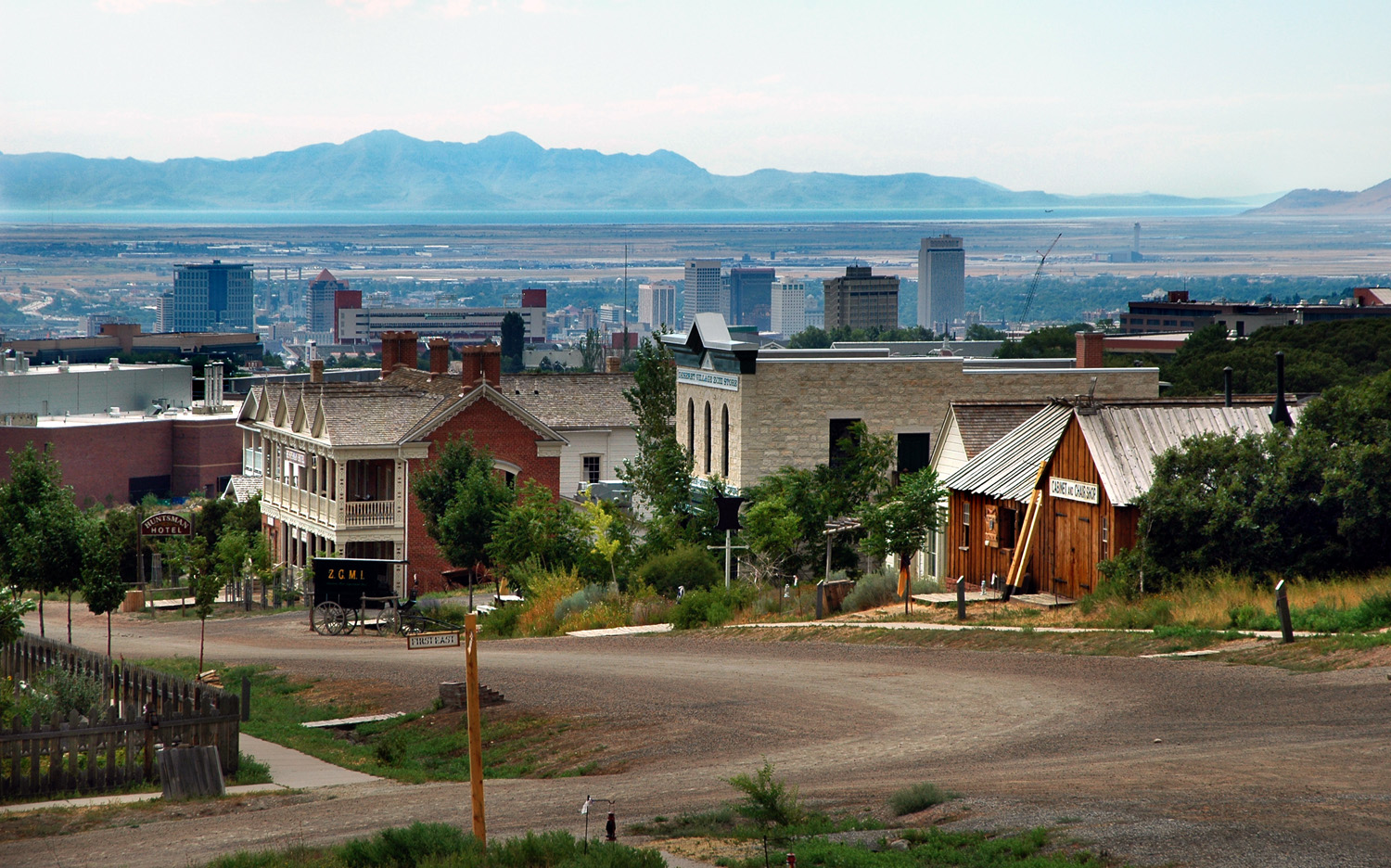
Deseret Village recreates Utah pioneer life for tourists.

The Golden Spike where the First transcontinental railroad was completed in the U.S. on May 10, 1869, in Promontory, Utah

The Utah Territory was much smaller than the proposed state of Deseret, but it still contained all of the present states of Nevada and Utah as well as pieces of modern Wyoming and Colorado. It was created with the Compromise of 1850, and Fillmore, named after President Millard Fillmore, was designated the capital. The territory was given the name Utah after the Ute tribe of Native Americans. Salt Lake City replaced Fillmore as the territorial capital in 1856.

By 1850, there were around 100 black people in the territory, the majority of whom were slaves. In Salt Lake County, 26 slaves were counted. In 1852, the territorial legislature passed the Act in Relation to Service and the Act for the relief of Indian Slaves and Prisoners formally legalizing slavery in the territory. Slavery was abolished in the territory during the Civil War.

In 1850, following a period of increasing tensions with the Timpanogos, Salt Lake City sent out a force known as the Nauvoo Legion, composed of 90 Mormon militiamen, and attacked an encampment of Timpanogos in what was called the Battle at Fort Utah, but would later be known as the 'Provo River massacre', in which between 40 and 100 Native Americans were killed.

Disputes between the Mormon inhabitants and the U.S. government intensified due to the practice of plural marriage, or polygamy, among members of the LDS Church. The Mormons were still pushing for the establishment of a State of Deseret with the new borders of the Utah Territory. Most, if not all, of the members of the U.S. government opposed the polygamous practices of the Mormons.

Members of the LDS Church were viewed as un-American and rebellious when news of their polygamous practices spread. In 1857, particularly heinous accusations of abdication of government and general immorality were leveled by former associate justice William W. Drummond, among others. The detailed reports of life in Utah caused the administration of James Buchanan to send a secret military "expedition" to Utah. When the supposed rebellion should be quelled, Alfred Cumming would take the place of Brigham Young as territorial governor. The resulting conflict is known as the Utah War, nicknamed "Buchanan's Blunder" by the Mormon leaders.

In September 1857, about 120 American settlers of the Baker–Fancher wagon train, en route to California from Arkansas, were murdered by Utah Territorial Militia and some Paiute Native Americans in the Mountain Meadows massacre.

Before troops led by Albert Sidney Johnston entered the territory, Brigham Young ordered all residents of Salt Lake City to evacuate southward to Utah Valley and sent out the Nauvoo Legion to delay the government's advance. Although wagons and supplies were burned, eventually the troops arrived in 1858, and Young surrendered official control to Cumming, although most subsequent commentators claim that Young retained true power in the territory. A steady stream of governors appointed by the president quit the position, often citing the traditions of their supposed territorial government. By agreement with Young, Johnston established Camp Floyd, 40 miles (60 km) away from Salt Lake City to the southwest.

Salt Lake City was the last link of the First Transcontinental Telegraph, completed in October 1861. Brigham Young was among the first to send a message, along with Abraham Lincoln and other officials.

Because of the American Civil War, federal troops were pulled out of Utah Territory in 1861. This was a boon to the local economy as the army sold everything in camp for pennies on the dollar before marching back east to join the war. The territory was then left in LDS hands until Patrick E. Connor arrived with a regiment of California volunteers in 1862. Connor established Fort Douglas just 3 miles (4.8 km) east of Salt Lake City and encouraged his people to discover mineral deposits to bring more non-Mormons into the territory. Minerals were discovered in Tooele County and miners began to flock to the territory.

Beginning in 1865, Utah's Black Hawk War developed into the deadliest conflict in the territory's history. Chief Antonga Black Hawk died in 1870, but fights continued to break out until additional federal troops were sent in to suppress the Ghost Dance of 1872. The war is unique among Indian Wars because it was a three-way conflict, with mounted Timpanogos Utes led by Antonga Black Hawk fighting federal and LDS authorities.

On May 10, 1869, the first transcontinental railroad was completed at Promontory Summit, north of the Great Salt Lake. The railroad brought increasing numbers of people into the territory and several influential businesspeople made fortunes there.

During the 1870s and 1880s laws were passed to punish polygamists due, in part, to stories from Utah. Notably, Ann Eliza Young—tenth wife to divorce Brigham Young, women's advocate, national lecturer, and author of Wife No. 19 or My Life of Bondage—and Fanny Stenhouse, author of Tell It All: My Life in Mormonism, testified to the happiness of the very early Church members before polygamy. They independently published their books in 1875. These books and the lectures of Ann Eliza Young have been credited with the United States Congress's passage of anti-polygamy laws by newspapers throughout the United States, as recorded in "The Ann Eliza Young Vindicator", a pamphlet which detailed Ms. Young's travels and warm reception throughout her lecture tour.

T. B. H. Stenhouse, former Utah Mormon polygamist, a Mormon missionary for thirteen years, and a Salt Lake City newspaper owner, finally left Utah and wrote The Rocky Mountain Saints. His book gives a witnessed account of life in Utah, both the good and the bad. He finally left Utah and Mormonism after financial ruin occurred when Brigham Young sent Stenhouse to relocate to Ogden, Utah, according to Stenhouse, to take over his thriving pro-Mormon Salt Lake Telegraph newspaper. In addition to these testimonies, The Confessions of John D. Lee, written by John D. Lee—alleged "Scapegoat" for the Mountain Meadow Massacre—also came out in 1877. The corroborative testimonies coming out of Utah from Mormons and former Mormons influenced Congress and the people of the United States.

In the 1890 Manifesto, the LDS Church banned polygamy. When Utah applied for statehood again, it was accepted. One of the conditions for granting Utah statehood was that a ban on polygamy be written into the state constitution. This was a condition required of other western states that were admitted into the Union later. Statehood was officially granted on January 4, 1896.

=== 20th century to present ===
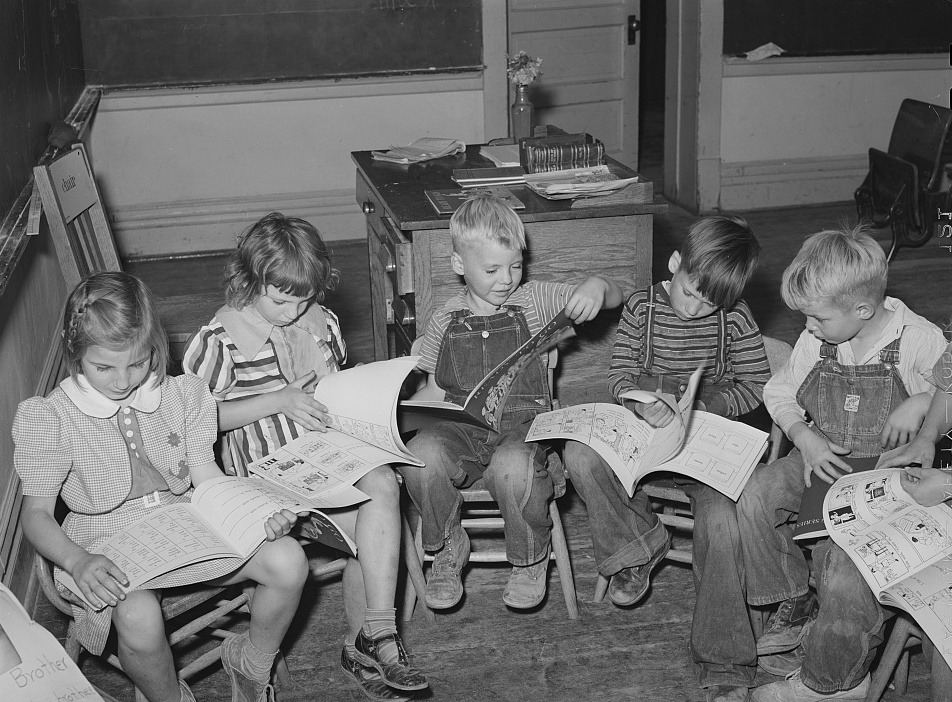
Children reading in Santa Clara, Utah, in 1940

Beginning in the early 20th century, with the establishment of such national parks as Bryce Canyon National Park and Zion National Park, Utah became known for its natural beauty. Southern Utah became a popular filming spot for arid, rugged scenes featured in the popular mid-century western film genre. From such films, most US residents recognize such natural landmarks as Delicate Arch and "the Mittens" of Monument Valley. During the 1950s, 1960s, and 1970s, with the construction of the Interstate highway system, accessibility to the southern scenic areas was made easier.

Since the establishment of Alta Ski Area in 1939 and the subsequent development of several ski resorts in the state's mountains, Utah's skiing has become world-renowned. The dry, powdery snow of the Wasatch Range is considered some of the best skiing in the world (the state license plate once claimed "the Greatest Snow on Earth"). Salt Lake City won the bid for the 2002 Winter Olympic Games, and this served as a great boost to the economy. The ski resorts have increased in popularity, and many of the Olympic venues built along the Wasatch Front continue to be used for sporting events. Preparation for the Olympics spurred the development of the light-rail system in the Salt Lake Valley, known as TRAX, and the reconstruction of the freeway system around the city. The state will again host the games in 2034.

In 1957, Utah created the Utah State Parks Commission with four parks. Today, Utah State Parks manages 43 parks and several undeveloped areas totaling over 95,000 acres (380 km^{2}) of land and more than 1,000,000 acres (4,000 km^{2}) of water. Utah's state parks are scattered throughout Utah, from Bear Lake State Park at the Utah/Idaho border to Edge of the Cedars State Park Museum deep in the Four Corners region and everywhere in between. Utah State Parks is also home to the state's off highway vehicle office, state boating office, and the trails program.

During the late 20th century, the state grew quickly. In the 1970s growth was phenomenal in the suburbs of the Wasatch Front. Sandy was one of the fastest-growing cities in the country at that time. Today, many areas of Utah continue to see boom-time growth. Northern Davis, southern and western Salt Lake, Summit, eastern Tooele, Utah, Wasatch, and Washington counties are all growing very quickly. Management of transportation and urbanization are major issues in politics, as development consumes agricultural land and wilderness areas and transportation is a major reason for poor air quality in Utah.

== Geography and geology ==
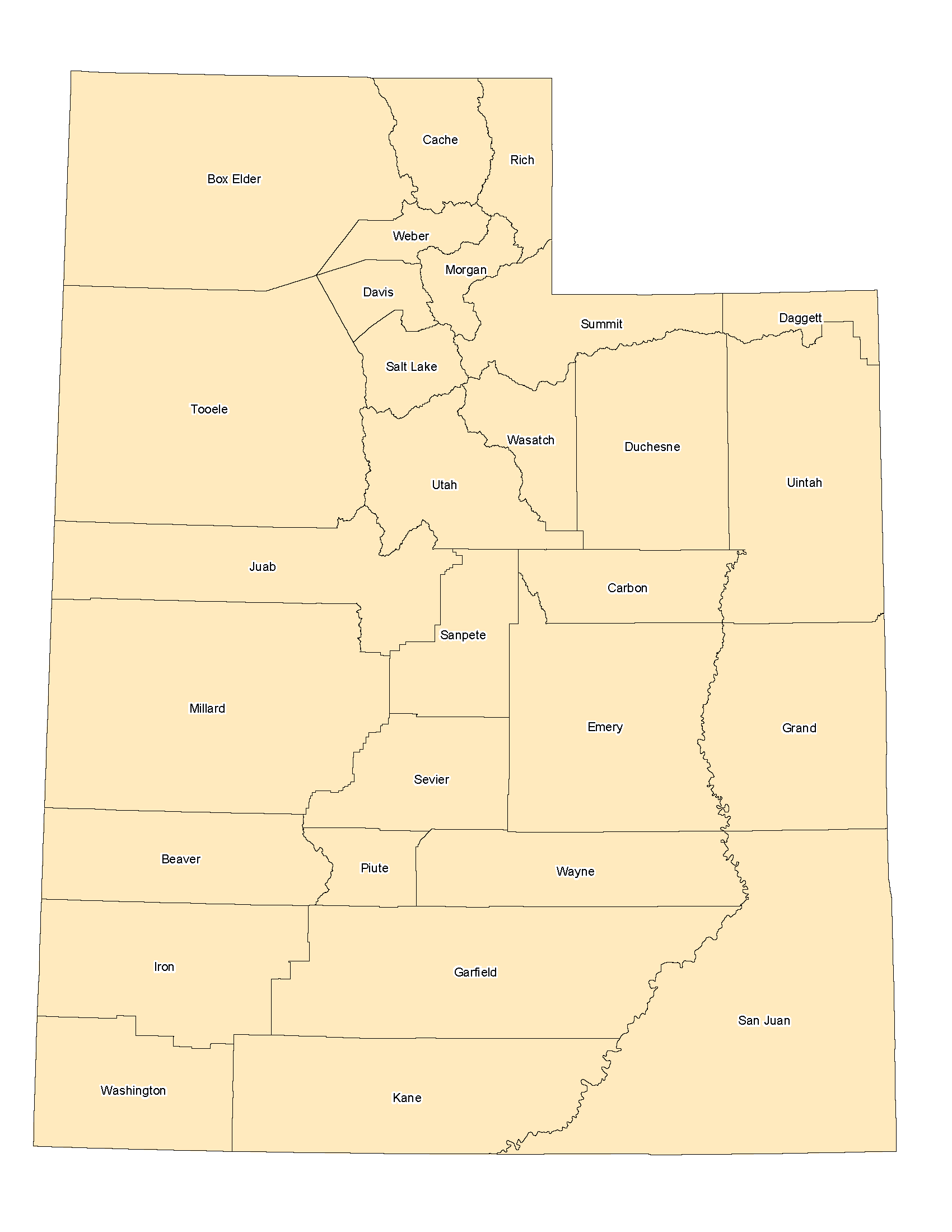
Utah county boundaries

Utah is known for its natural diversity and is home to features ranging from arid deserts with dunes to thriving pine forests in mountain valleys. It is a rugged and geographically diverse state at the convergence of three distinct geological regions: the Rocky Mountains, the Great Basin, and the Colorado Plateau.

Utah covers an area of 84,899 sq mi (219,890 km^{2}). It is one of the Four Corners states and is bordered by Idaho in the north, Wyoming in the north and east, Colorado in the east, at a single point by New Mexico to the southeast, by Arizona in the south, and by Nevada in the west. Only three U.S. states (Utah, Colorado, and Wyoming) have exclusively latitude and longitude lines as boundaries.

One of Utah's defining characteristics is the variety of its terrain. Running down the middle of the state's northern third is the Wasatch Range, which rises to heights of almost 12,000 ft (3,700 m) above sea level. Utah is home to world-renowned ski resorts made popular by light, fluffy snow and winter storms that regularly dump up to three feet of it overnight. In the state's northeastern section, running east to west, are the Uinta Mountains, which rise to heights of over 13,000 feet (4,000 m). The highest point in the state, Kings Peak, at 13,528 feet (4,123 m), lies within the Uinta Mountains.

At the western base of the Wasatch Range is the Wasatch Front, a series of valleys and basins that are home to the most populous parts of the state. It stretches approximately from Brigham City at the north end to Nephi at the south end. Approximately 75 percent of the state's population lives in this corridor, and population growth is rapid.

Western Utah is a mostly arid desert with a basin and range topography. Small mountain ranges and rugged terrain punctuate the landscape. The Bonneville Salt Flats are an exception, being comparatively flat as a result of once forming the bed of ancient Lake Bonneville. Great Salt Lake, Utah Lake, Sevier Lake, and Rush Lake are all remnants of this ancient freshwater lake, which once covered most of the eastern Great Basin. West of the Great Salt Lake, stretching to the Nevada border, lies the arid Great Salt Lake Desert. One exception to this aridity is Snake Valley, which is (relatively) lush due to large springs and wetlands fed from groundwater derived from snow melt in the Snake Range, Deep Creek Range, and other tall mountains to the west of Snake Valley. Great Basin National Park is just over the Nevada state line in the southern Snake Range. One of western Utah's most impressive, but least visited attractions is Notch Peak, the tallest limestone cliff in North America, located west of Delta.

Much of the scenic southern and southeastern landscape (specifically the Colorado Plateau region) is sandstone, specifically Kayenta sandstone and Navajo sandstone. The Colorado River and its tributaries wind their way through the sandstone, creating some of the world's most striking and wild terrain (the area around the confluence of the Colorado and Green Rivers was the last to be mapped in the lower 48 United States). Wind and rain have also sculpted the soft sandstone over millions of years. Canyons, gullies, arches, pinnacles, buttes, bluffs, and mesas are common sights throughout south-central and southeast Utah.

This terrain is the central feature of protected state and federal parks such as Arches, Bryce Canyon, Canyonlands, Capitol Reef, and Zion national parks, Cedar Breaks, Grand Staircase–Escalante, Hovenweep, and Natural Bridges national monuments, Glen Canyon National Recreation Area (site of the popular tourist destination, Lake Powell), Dead Horse Point and Goblin Valley state parks, and Monument Valley. The Navajo Nation also extends into southeastern Utah, and the tribe is part of the coalition that manages Bears Ears National Monument. Southeastern Utah is also punctuated by the remote, but lofty La Sal, Abajo, and Henry mountain ranges.

Eastern (northern quarter) Utah is a high-elevation area covered mostly by plateaus and basins, particularly the Tavaputs Plateau and San Rafael Swell, which remain mostly inaccessible, and the Uinta Basin, where the majority of eastern Utah's population lives. Economies are dominated by mining, oil shale, oil, and natural gas-drilling, ranching, and recreation. Much of eastern Utah is part of the Uintah and Ouray Indian Reservation. The most popular destination within northeastern Utah is Dinosaur National Monument near Vernal.

Southwestern Utah is the lowest and hottest spot in Utah. It is known as Utah's Dixie because early settlers were able to grow some cotton there. Beaverdam Wash in far southwestern Utah is the lowest point in the state, at 2,000 feet (610 m). The northernmost portion of the Mojave Desert is also located in this area. Dixie is quickly becoming a popular recreational and retirement destination, and the population is growing rapidly. Although the Wasatch Mountains end at Mount Nebo near Nephi, a complex series of mountain ranges extends south from the southern end of the range down the spine of Utah. Just north of Dixie and east of Cedar City is the state's highest ski resort, Brian Head.

Like most of the western states, the federal government owns much of the land in Utah. In 2020, 63.1% of the land was either BLM land, or U.S. National Forest, U.S. National Park, U.S. National Monument, National Recreation Area or U.S. Wilderness Area. Utah is the only state where every county contains some national forest.

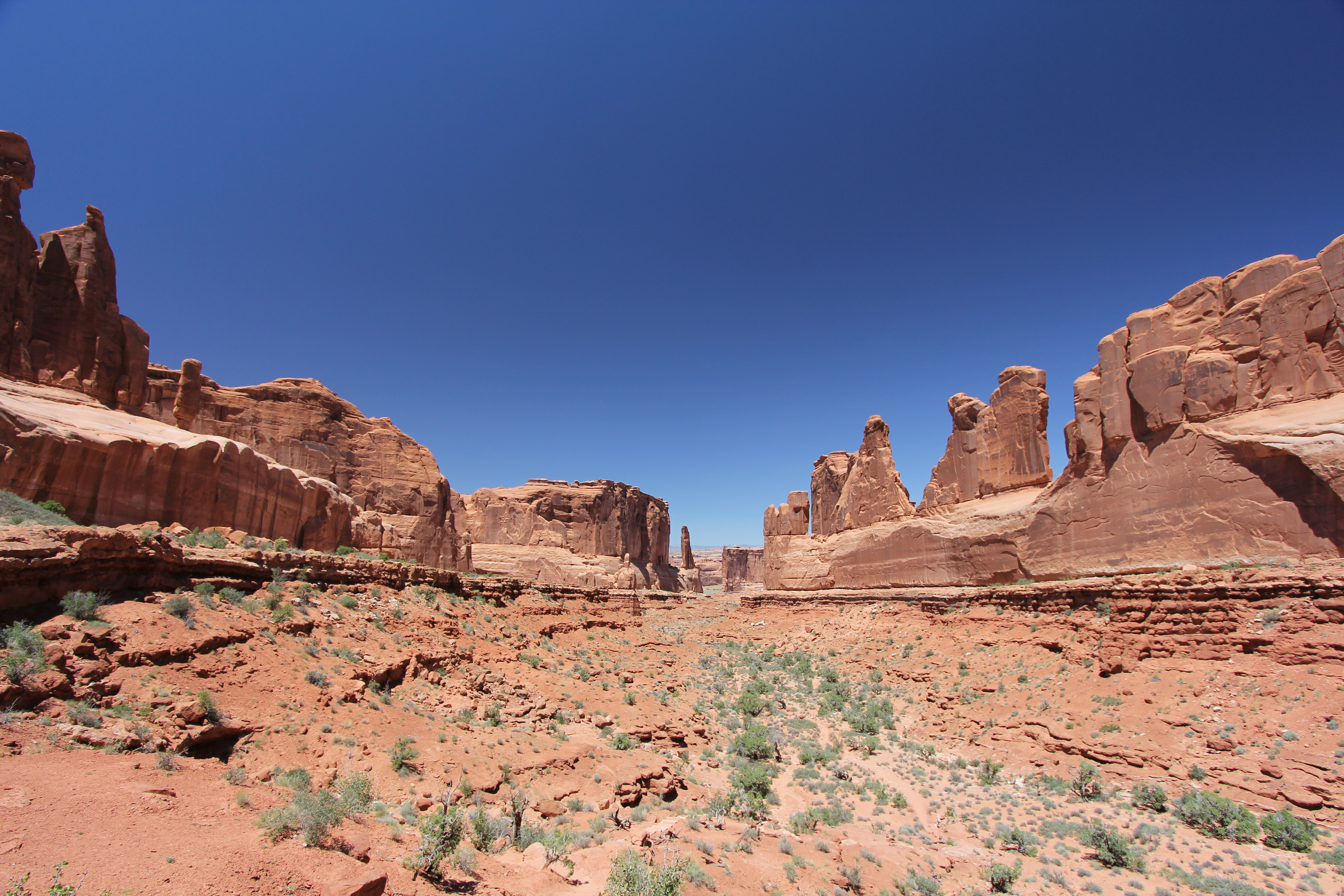
Arches National Park

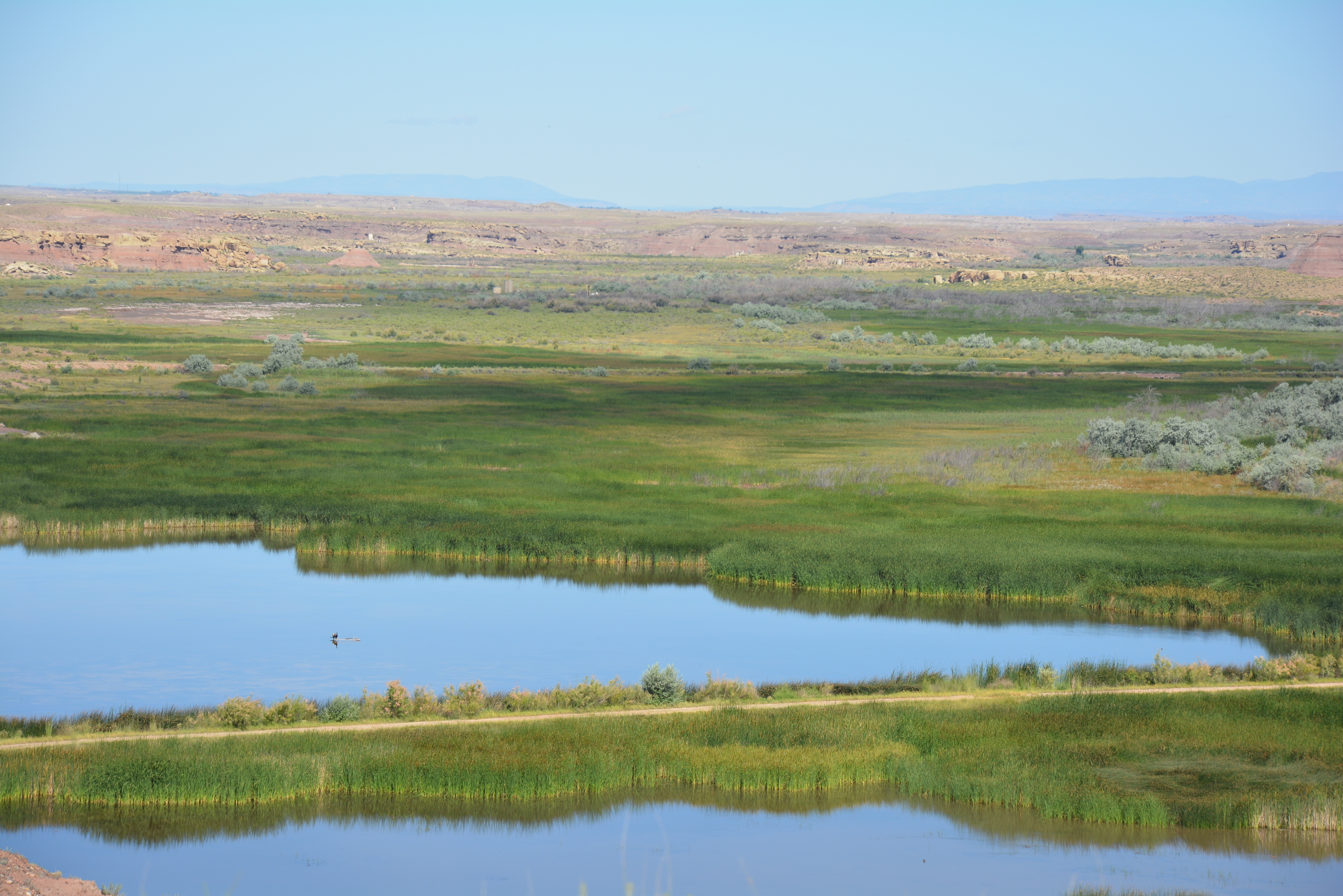
Pariette Wetlands

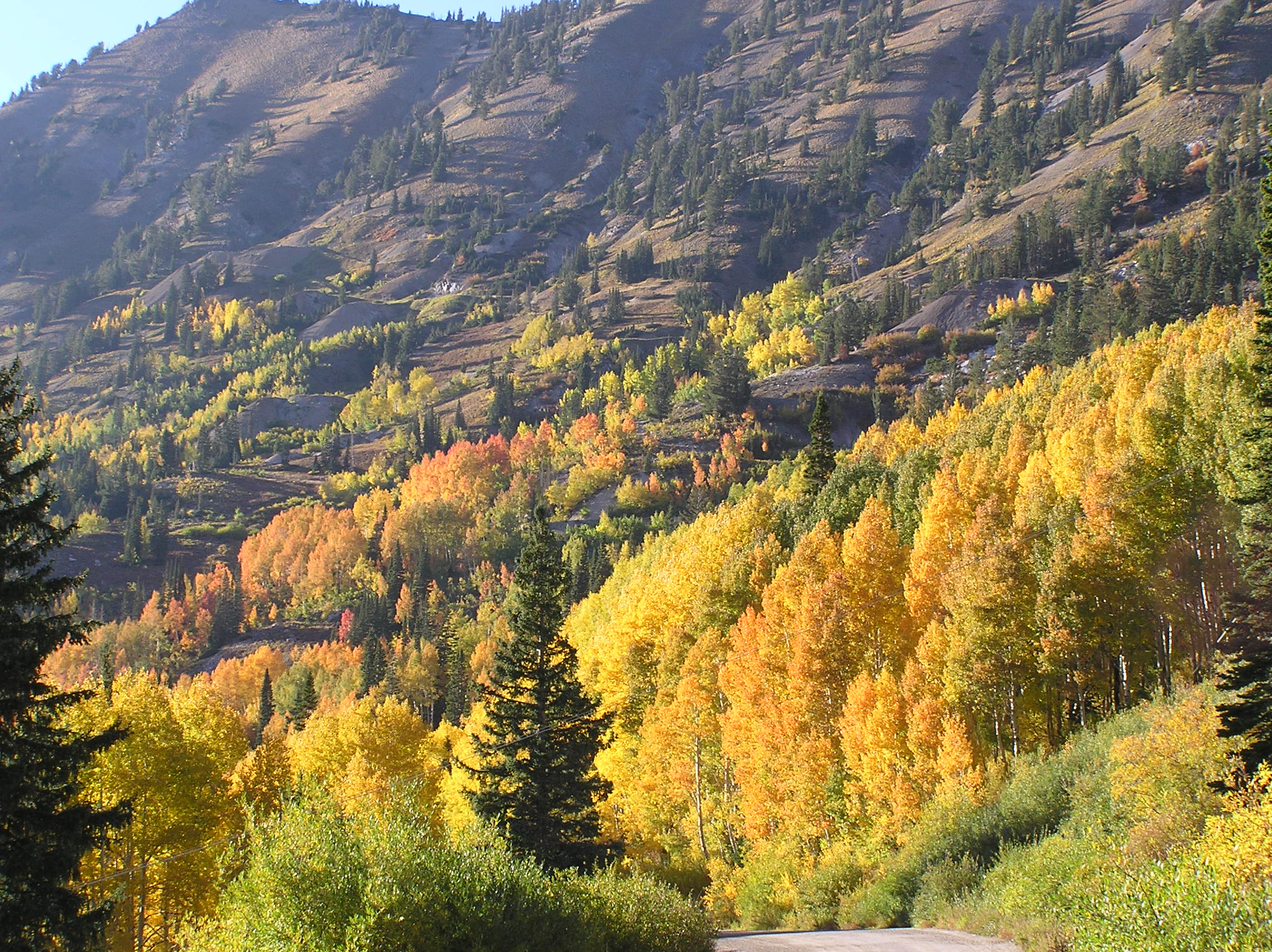
Little Cottonwood Canyon

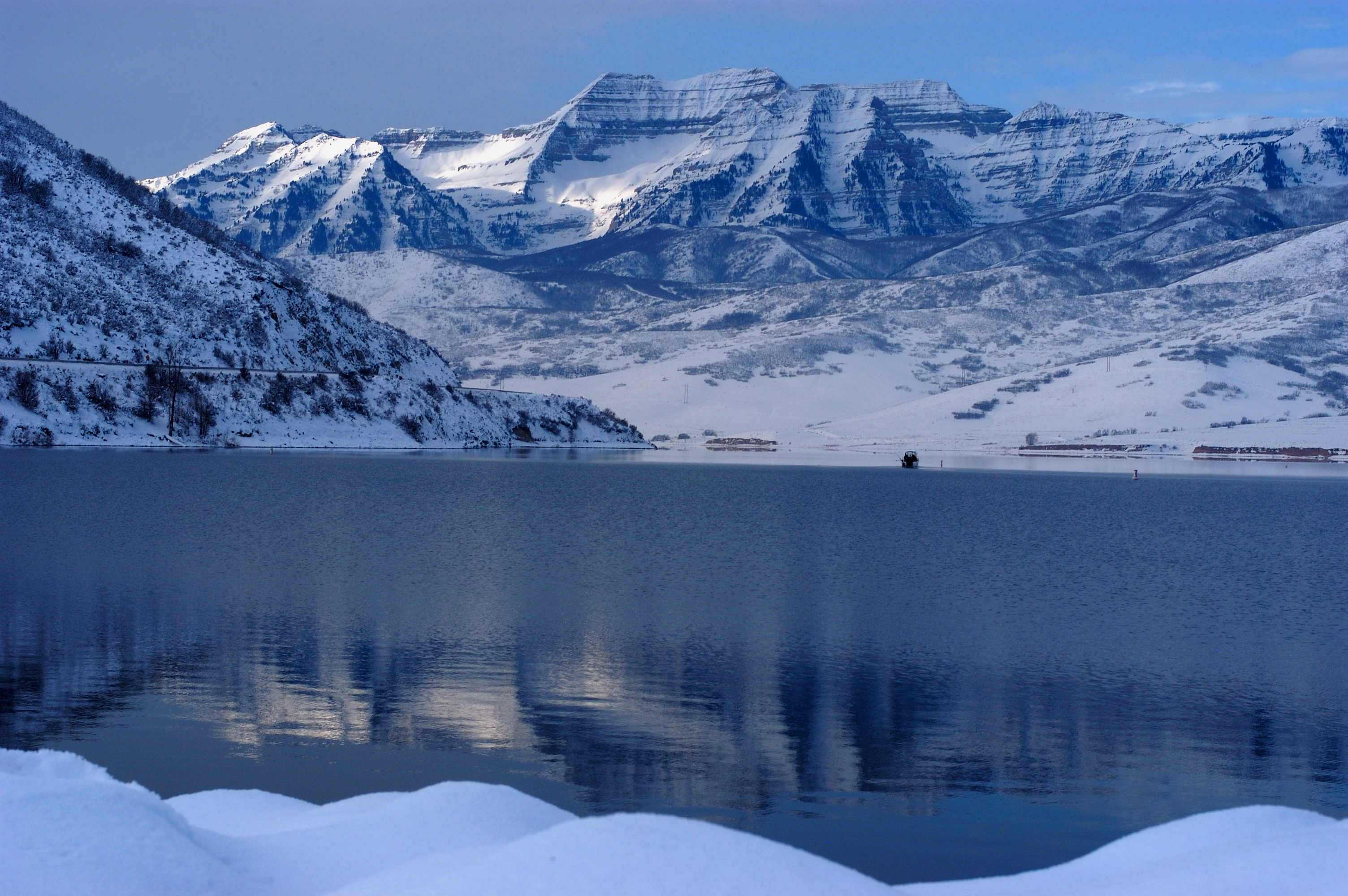
Deer Creek Reservoir

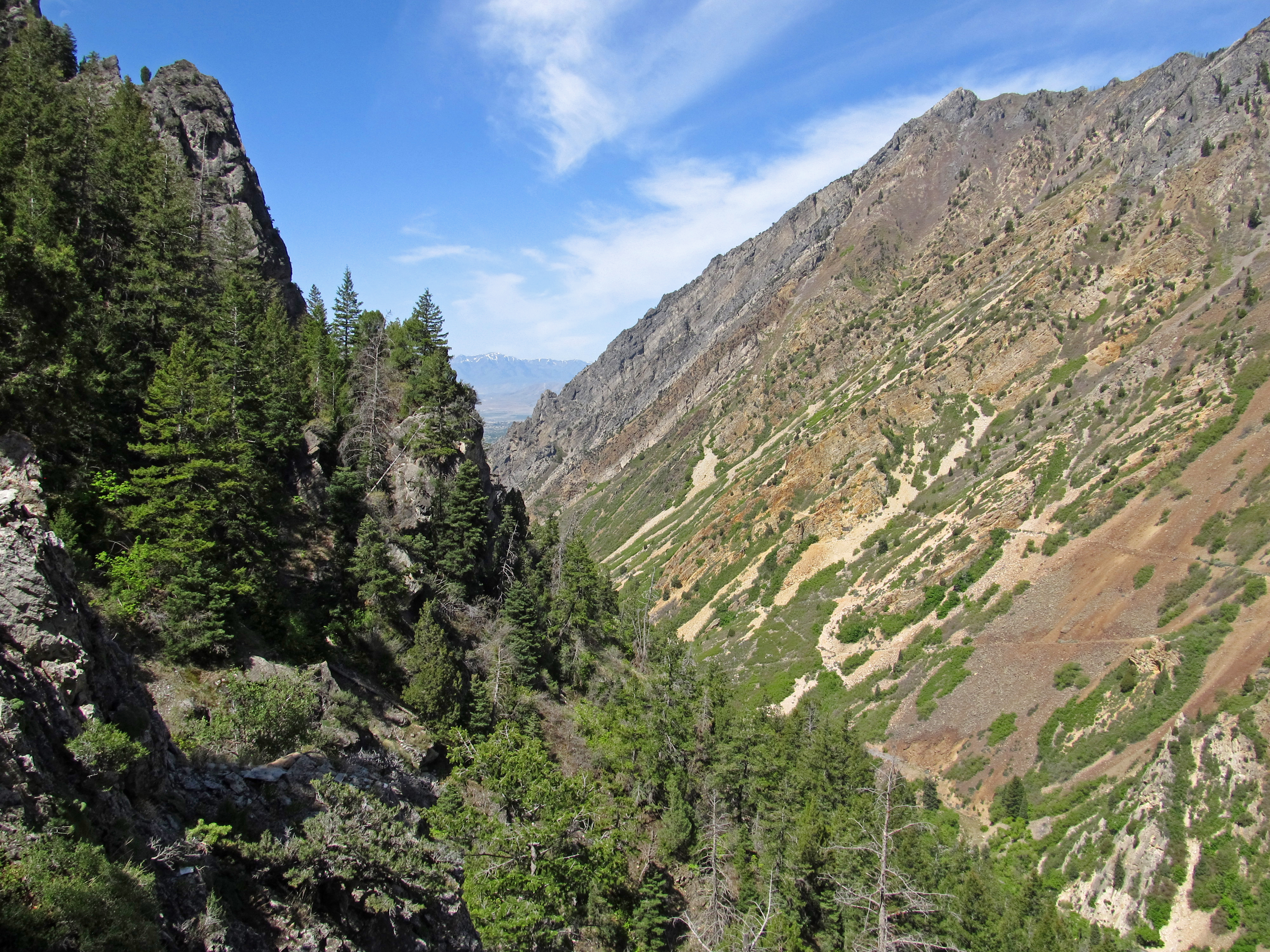
American Fork Canyon

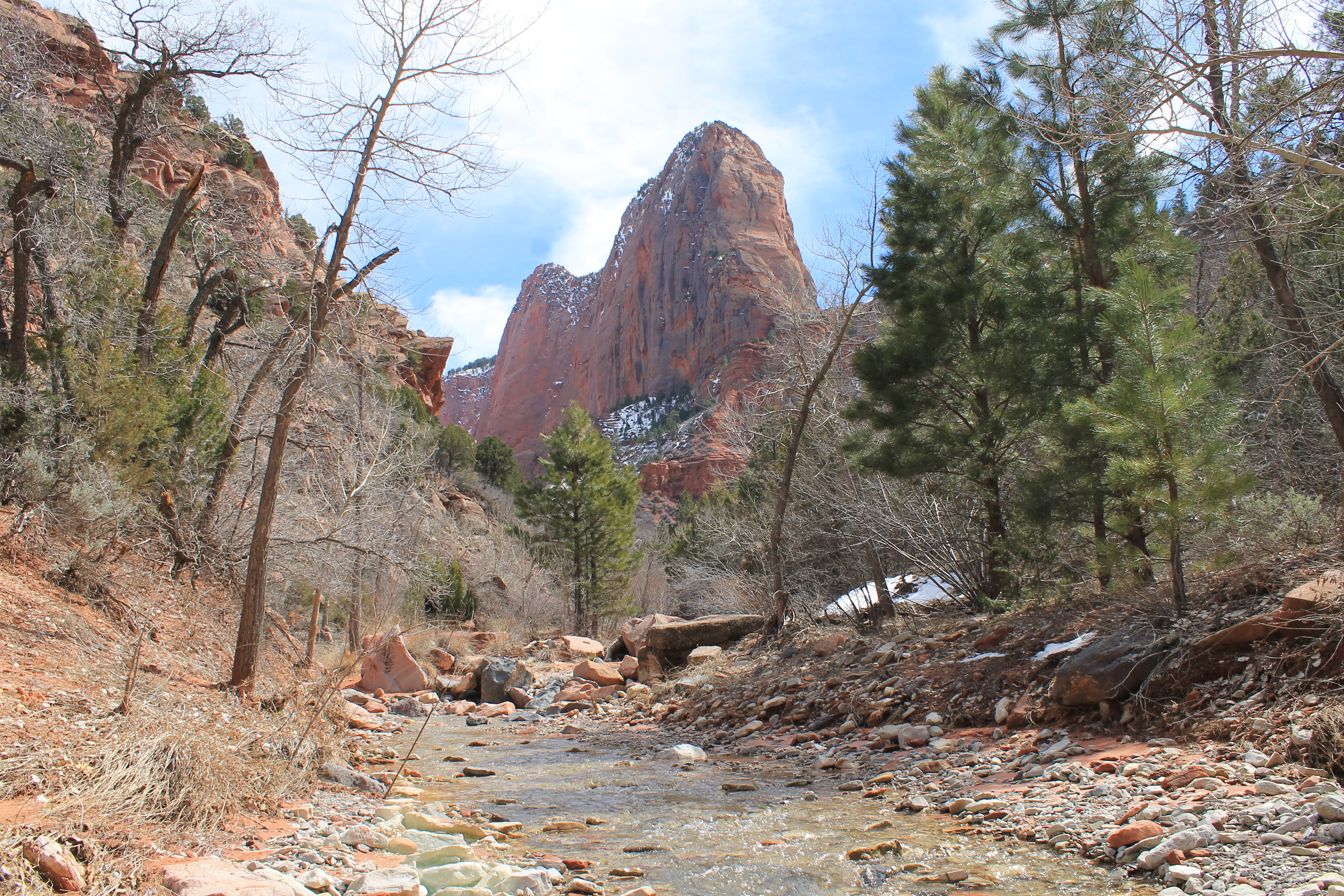
Kolob Canyons at Zion National Park

=== Adjacent states ===
- Idaho (north)
- Wyoming (east and north)
- Colorado (east)
- Nevada (west)
- Arizona (south)

=== Climate ===
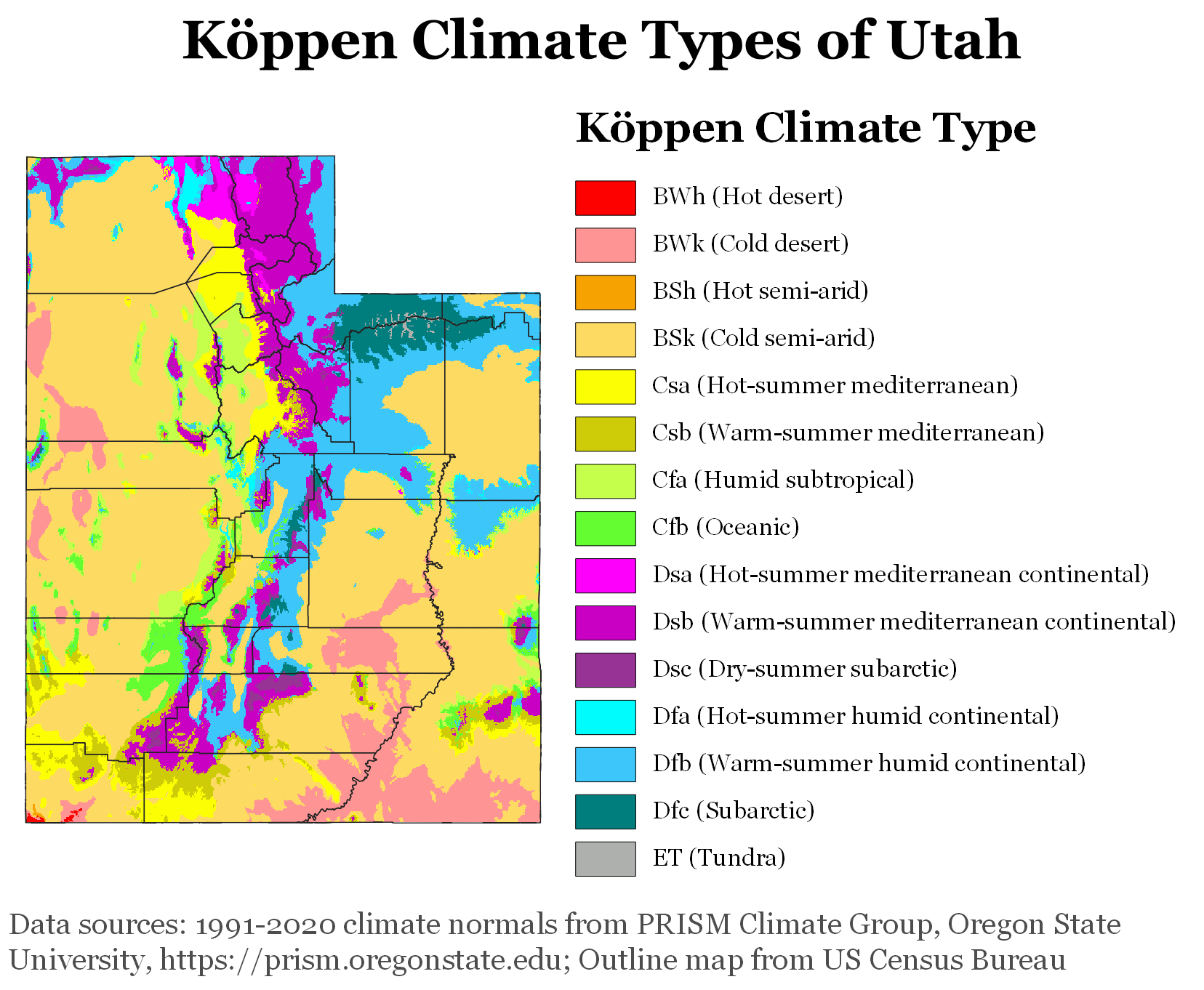
Köppen climate types of Utah, using 1991–2020 climate normals.

Utah features a dry, semi-arid to desert climate; however, its many mountains feature a large variety of climates, with the highest points in the Uinta Mountains being above the timberline. The dry weather is a result of the state's location in the rain shadow of the Sierra Nevada in California. The eastern half of the state lies in the rain shadow of the Wasatch Mountains. The primary source of precipitation for the state is the Pacific Ocean, with the state usually lying in the path of large Pacific storms from October to May. In summer, the state, especially southern and eastern Utah, lies in the path of monsoon moisture from the Gulf of California.

Most of the lowland areas receive less than 12 inches (305 mm) of precipitation annually, although the I-15 corridor, including the densely populated Wasatch Front, receives approximately 15 inches (381 mm). The Great Salt Lake Desert is the driest area of the state, with less than 5 inches (127 mm). Snowfall is common in all but the far southern valleys. Although St. George receives only about 3 inches (76 mm) per year, Salt Lake City sees about 60 inches (1,524 mm), enhanced by the lake-effect snow from the Great Salt Lake, which increases snowfall totals to the south, southeast, and east of the lake.

Some areas of the Wasatch Range in the path of the lake effect receive up to 500 inches (1,270 cm) per year. This micro climate of enhanced snowfall from the Great Salt Lake spans the entire proximity of the lake. The cottonwood canyons adjacent to Salt Lake City are located in the right position to receive more precipitation from the lake. The consistently deep powder snow led Utah's ski industry to adopt the slogan "the Greatest Snow on Earth" in the 1980s. In the winter, temperature inversions are a common phenomenon across Utah's low basins and valleys, leading to thick haze and fog that can last for weeks at a time, especially in the Uintah Basin. Although at other times of year, its air quality is good, winter inversions give Salt Lake City some of the worst wintertime pollution in the country.

Previous studies have indicated a widespread decline in snowpack over Utah accompanied by a decline in the snow–snow-precipitation ratio while anecdotal evidence claims have been put forward that measured changes in Utah's snowpack are spurious and do not reflect actual change. A 2012 study found that the proportion of winter (January–March) precipitation falling as snow has decreased by nine percent during the last half century, a combined result of a significant increase in rainfall and a minor decrease in snowfall. Meanwhile, observed snow depth across Utah has decreased and is accompanied by consistent decreases in snow cover and surface albedo. Weather systems with the potential to produce precipitation in Utah have decreased in number with those producing snowfall decreasing at a considerably greater rate.

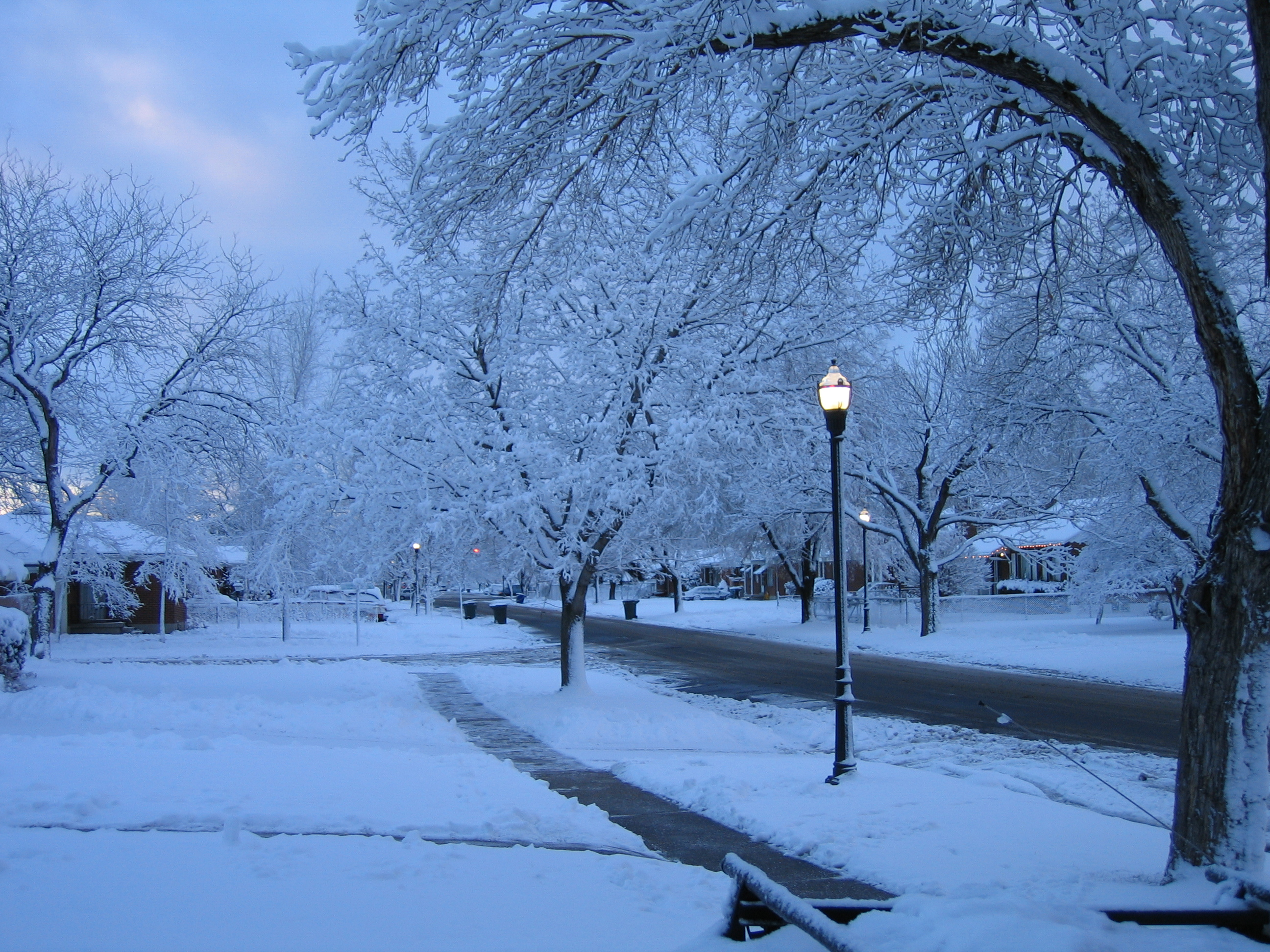
Snow in Rose Park, Salt Lake City

Utah's temperatures are extreme, with cold temperatures in winter due to its elevation, and very hot summers statewide (except mountain areas and high mountain valleys). Utah is usually protected from major blasts of cold air by mountains lying north and east of the state, although major Arctic blasts can occasionally reach the state. Average January high temperatures range from around 30 °F (−1 °C) in some northern valleys to almost 55 °F (13 °C) in St. George.

Temperatures dropping below 0 °F (−18 °C) should be expected on occasion in most areas of the state most years, although some areas see it often (for example, the town of Randolph averages about fifty days per year with temperatures that low). In July, average highs range from about 85 to 100 °F (29 to 38 °C). However, the low humidity and high elevation typically lead to large temperature variations, leading to cool nights on most summer days. The record high temperature in Utah was 118 °F (48 °C), recorded south of St. George on July 4, 2007, and the record low was −69 °F (−56 °C), recorded at Peter Sinks in the Bear River Mountains of northern Utah on February 1, 1985. However, the record low for an inhabited location is −49 °F (−45 °C) at Woodruff on December 12, 1932.

Utah, like most of the western United States, has few days of thunderstorms. On average, there are fewer than 40 days of thunderstorm activity during the year; however, these storms can be briefly intense when they do occur. They are most likely to occur during monsoon season from about mid-July through mid-September, especially in southern and eastern Utah. Dry lightning strikes and the generally dry weather often spark wildfires in summer, while intense thunderstorms can lead to flash flooding, especially in the rugged terrain of southern Utah. Although spring is the wettest season in northern Utah, late summer is the wettest period for much of the south and east of the state. Tornadoes are uncommon in Utah, with an average of two striking the state yearly, rarely higher than EF1 intensity.

One exception of note, however, was the unprecedented Salt Lake City Tornado that moved directly across downtown Salt Lake City on August 11, 1999. The F2 tornado killed one person, injured 60 others, and caused approximately $170 million in damage; it was the second strongest tornado in the state behind an F3 on August 11, 1993, in the Uinta Mountains. The only other reported tornado fatality in Utah's history was a 7-year-old girl who was killed while camping in Summit County on July 6, 1884.

=== Wildlife ===
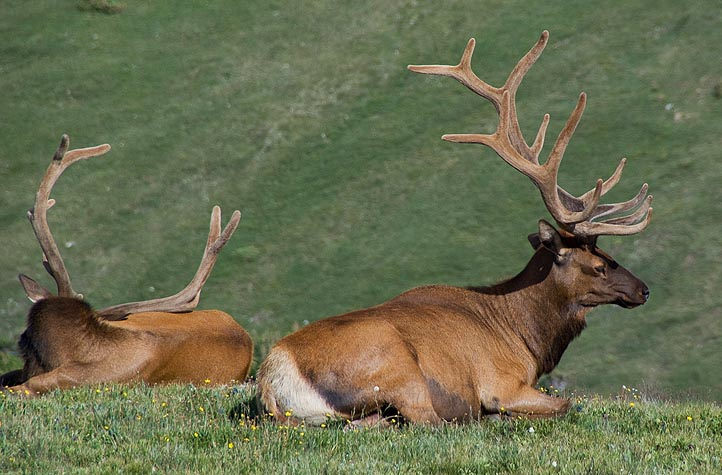
The Rocky Mountain elk is the Utah state mammal.

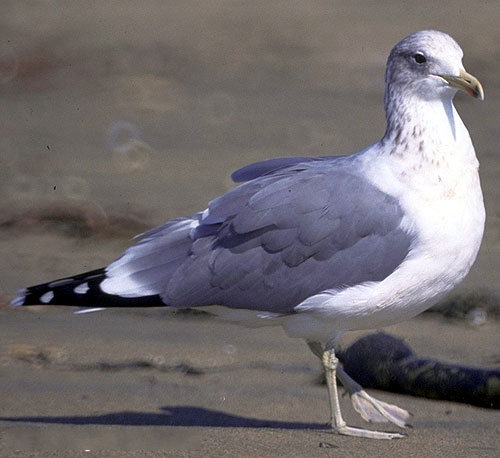
The California gull is the Utah state bird.

Utah is home to more than 600 vertebrate animal species as well as numerous invertebrates and insects.

==== Mammals ====
Mammals are found in every area of Utah. Non-predatory larger mammals include the plains bison, elk, moose, mountain goat, mule deer, pronghorn, and multiple types of bighorn sheep. Non-predatory small mammals include muskrat, and nutria. Large and small predatory mammals include the black bear, cougar, Canada lynx, bobcat, fox (gray, red, and kit), coyote, badger, black-footed ferret, mink, stoat, long-tailed weasel, raccoon, and otter.

The brown bear was formerly found within Utah, but has since been extirpated. There are no confirmed mating pairs of gray wolves in Utah, although there have been sightings in northeastern Utah along the Wyoming border.

==== Birds ====
As of January 2020, there were 466 species included in the official list managed by the Utah Bird Records Committee (UBRC). Of these, 119 are classed as accidental, 29 are classed as occasional, 57 are classed as rare, and 10 have been introduced to Utah or North America. Eleven of the accidental species are also classed as provisional.

Due to the "Miracle of the Gulls" incident in 1848, the most well-known bird in Utah is the California gull, which is also the Utah state bird. A monument in Salt Lake City commemorates the Miracle of the Gulls. Other gulls common to Utah include Bonaparte's gull, the ring-billed gull, and Franklin's gull.

Other birds commonly found include the American robin, the common starling, finches (black rosy, Cassin's, and goldfinch), the black-billed magpie, mourning doves, sparrows (house, tree, black-chinned, black-throated, Brewer's, and chipping), Clark's grebe, the ferruginous hawk, geese (snow, cackling, and Canada), eagles (golden and bald), California quail, mountain bluebird, and hummingbirds (calliope, black-chinned, and broad-tailed).

==== Invertebrates ====
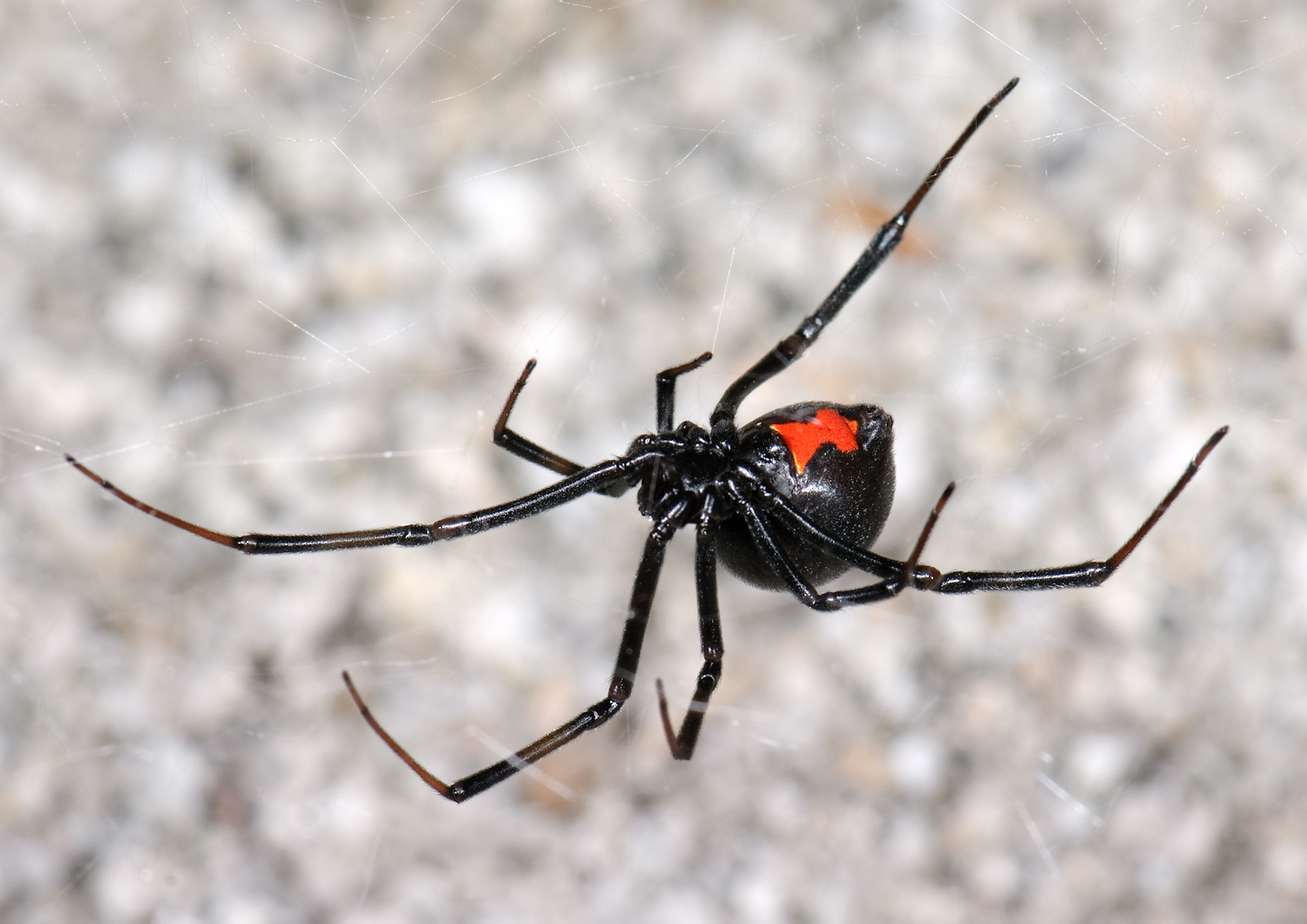
Western black widow spider

Utah is host to a wide variety of arachnids, insects, mollusks, and other invertebrates. Arachnids include the Arizona bark scorpion, Western black widow spiders, crab spiders, hobo spiders (Tegenaria agrestis), cellar spiders, American grass spiders, woodlouse spiders. Several spiders found in Utah are often mistaken for the brown recluse spider, including the desert recluse spider (found only in Washington County), the cellar spider, and crevice weaving spiders. The brown recluse spider has not been officially confirmed in Utah as of summer 2020.

One of the rarest insects in Utah is the Coral Pink Sand Dunes tiger beetle, found only in Coral Pink Sand Dunes State Park, near Kanab. It was proposed in 2012 to be listed as a threatened species, but the proposal was not accepted. Other insects include grasshoppers, green stink bugs, the Army cutworm, the monarch butterfly, and Mormon fritillary butterfly. The white-lined sphinx moth is common to most of the United States, but there have been reported outbreaks of large groups of their larvae damaging tomato, grape and garden crops in Utah. Four or five species of firefly are also found across the state.

In February 2009, Africanized honeybees were found in southern Utah. The bees had spread into eight counties in Utah, as far north as Grand and Emery counties by May 2017.

=== Vegetation ===
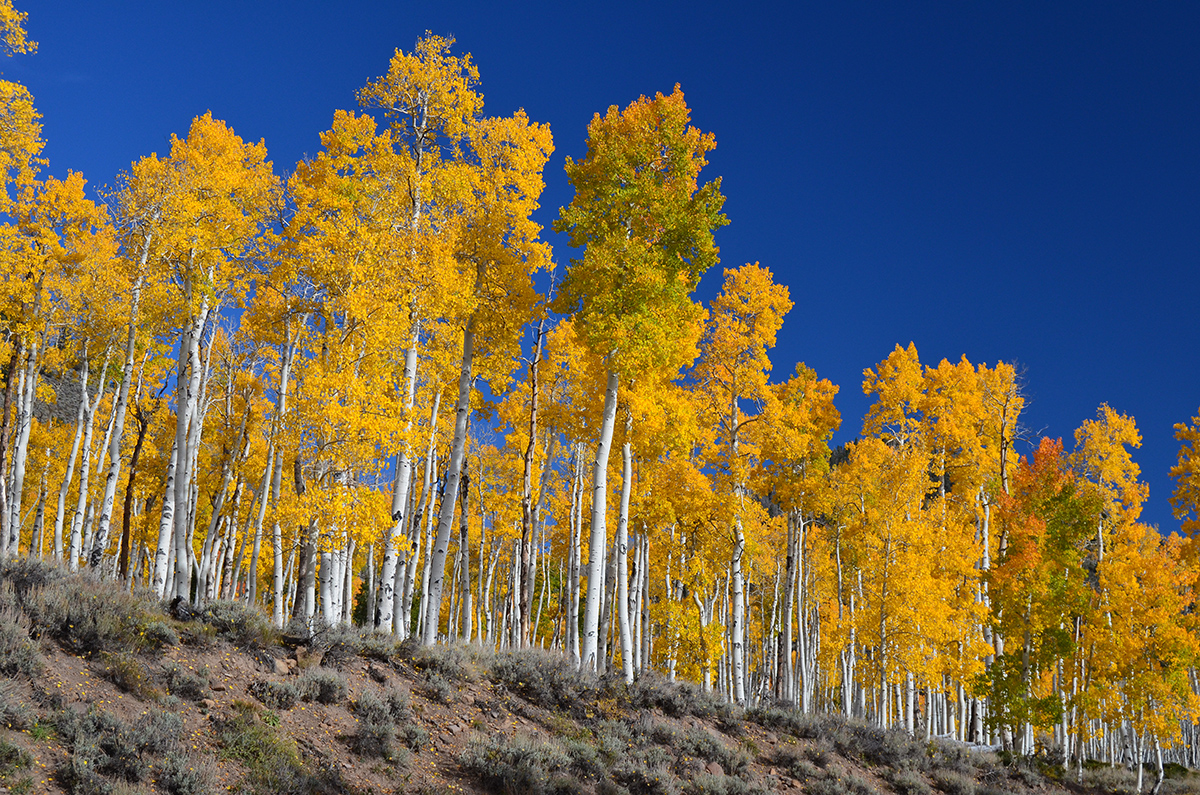
Pando, considered one of the heaviest and oldest organisms on Earth.

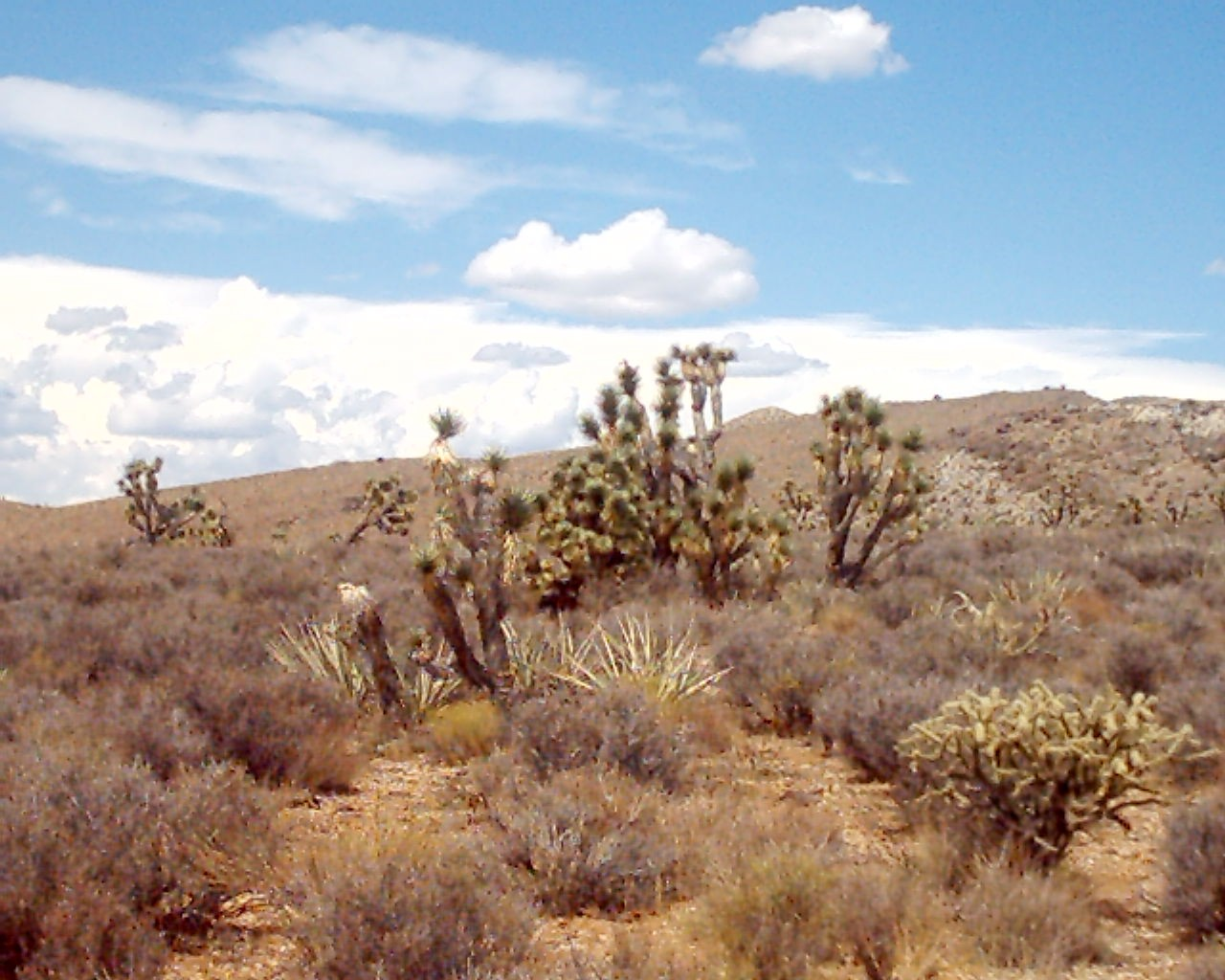
Joshua trees, yuccas, and cholla cactus occupy the far southwest corner of the state in the Mojave Desert

Several thousand plants are native to Utah, including a variety of trees, shrubs, cacti, herbaceous plants, and grasses. As of 2018, there are 3,930 species of plants in Utah, with 3,128 of those being indigenous and 792 being introduced through various means.

Common trees include pines/piñons (white fir, Colorado, single-leaf, Great Basin bristlecone, ponderosa, Engelmann spruce, Rocky Mountain white), and Acer grandidentatum, quaking aspen, bigtooth maple, Utah juniper, speckled alder, red birch, Gambel oak, desert willow, blue spruce, and Joshua trees. Utah has a number of named trees, including the Jardine Juniper, Pando, and the Thousand Mile Tree. Shrubs include a number of different ephedras (pitamoreal, Navajo, Arizona, Nevada, Torrey's jointfir, and green Mormon tea), sagebrushes (little, Bigelow, silver, Michaux's wormwood, black, pygmy, bud, and Great Basin), blue elderberry, Utah serviceberry, chokecherry, and skunkbush sumac. Western poison oak, poison sumac, and western poison ivy are all found in Utah.

There are many varieties of cacti in Utah's varied deserts, especially in the southern and western parts of the state. Some of these include desert prickly pear, California barrel cactus, fishhook cactus, cholla, beavertail prickly pear, and Uinta Basin hookless cactus. Despite the desert climate, many different grasses are found in Utah, including Mormon needlegrass, bluebunch wheatgrass, western alkali grass, squirreltail, desert saltgrass, and cheatgrass.

Several invasive species of plants are considered noxious weeds by the state, including Bermuda grass, field bindweed, henbane, jointed goatgrass, Canada thistle, Balkan and common toadflax, giant cane, couch grass, St. John's wort, hemlock, sword grass, Russian olive, myrtle spurge, Japanese knotweed, salt cedar, and goat's head.

== Demographics ==
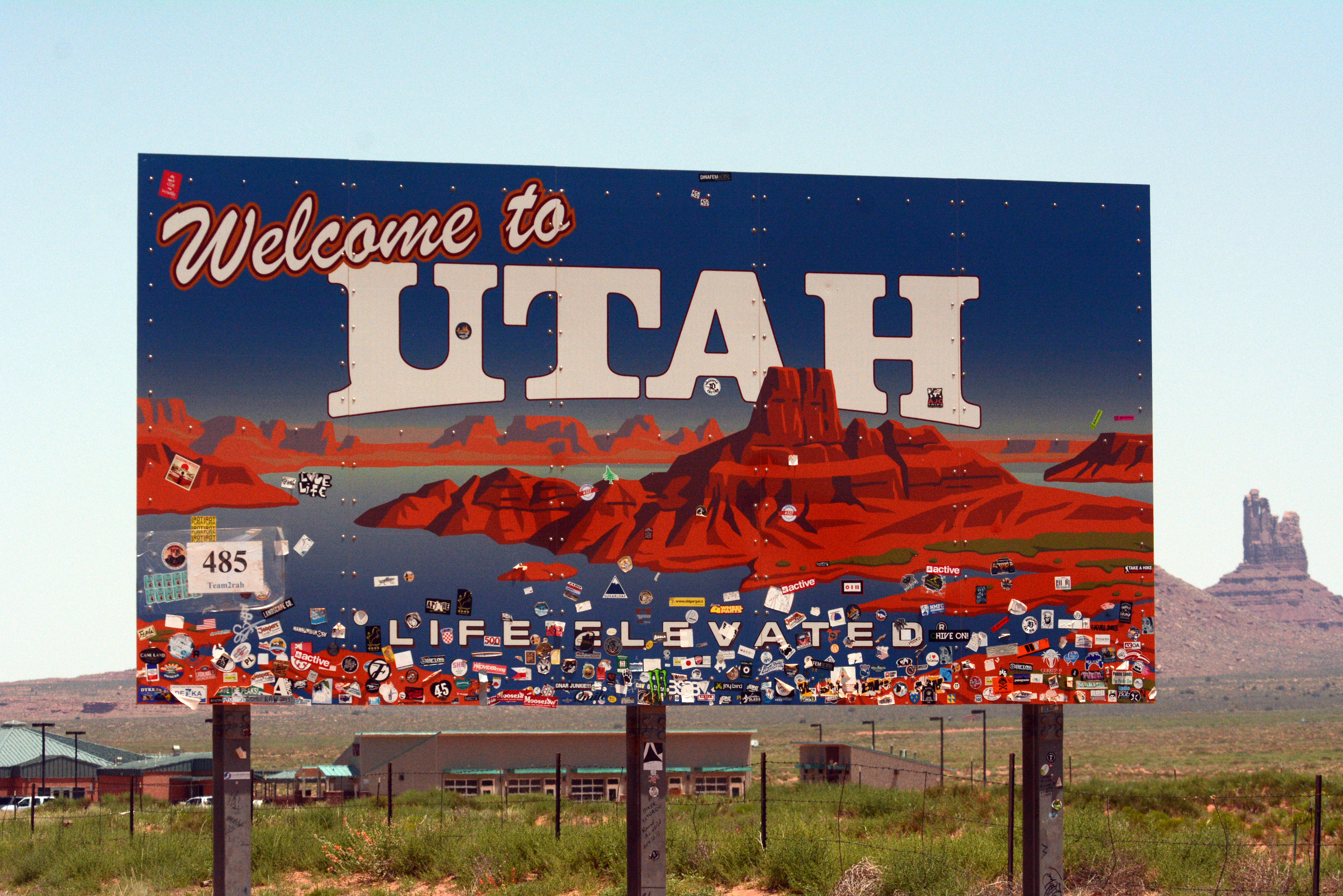
"Welcome to Utah" sign

At the 2020 U.S. census, Utah had a population of 3,271,616. The U.S. Census Bureau estimated that the population of Utah was 3,205,958 on July 1, 2019, a 16.00% increase since the 2010 U.S. census. The center of population of Utah is located in Utah County in the city of Lehi. Much of the population lives in cities and towns along the Wasatch Front, a metropolitan region that runs north–south with the Wasatch Mountains rising on the eastern side. Growth outside the Wasatch Front is also increasing. As of 2005, the St. George metropolitan area was the second fastest-growing in the country after the Las Vegas metropolitan area, while the Heber City, Utah, micropolitan area was also the second fastest-growing in the country (behind Palm Coast, Florida).

Utah contains five metropolitan areas (Logan, Ogden-Clearfield, Salt Lake City, Provo-Orem, and St. George), and six micropolitan areas (Brigham City, Heber, Vernal, Price, Richfield, and Cedar City).

According to HUD's 2022 Annual Homeless Assessment Report, there were an estimated 3,557 homeless people in Utah.

The majority of Utah's immigrants come from Mexico.

=== Health and fertility ===
Utah ranks among the highest in total fertility rate, 47th in teenage pregnancy, lowest in percentage of births out of wedlock, lowest in number of abortions per capita, and lowest in percentage of teen pregnancies terminated in abortion. However, statistics relating to pregnancies and abortions may also be artificially low from teenagers going out of state for abortions because of parental notification requirements. Utah has the lowest child poverty rate in the country, despite its young demographics. According to the Gallup-Healthways Global Well-Being Index as of 2012, Utahns ranked fourth in overall well-being in the United States. A 2002 national prescription drug study determined that antidepressant drugs were "prescribed in Utah more often than in any other state, at a rate nearly twice the national average". The data shows that depression rates in Utah are no higher than the national average. In 2022, Utah had the lowest percent of births to unmarried women of any US state, at 20.3 percent.

=== Ancestry and race ===
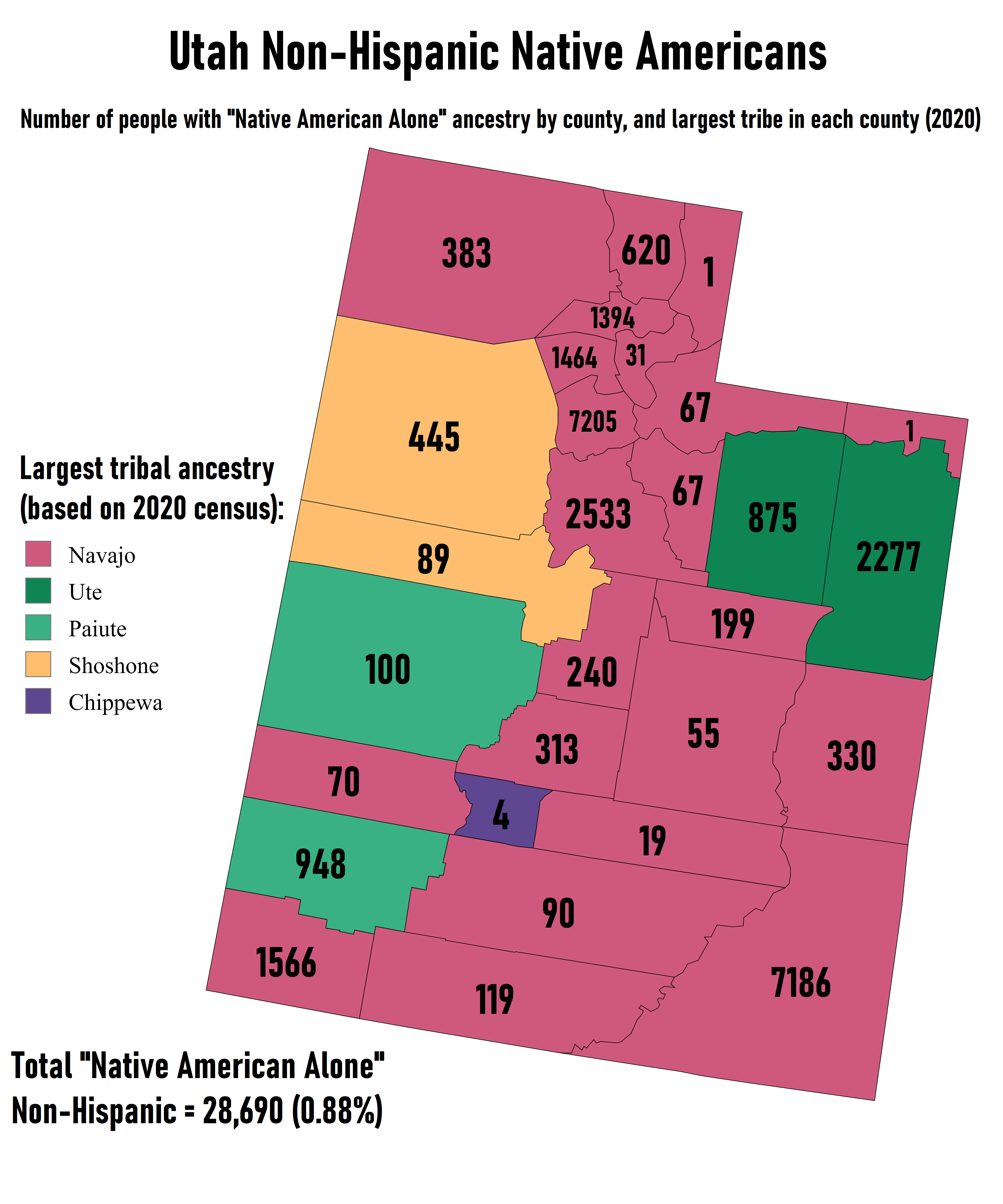

Historical population
Census	Pop.	Note	%±
1850	11,380		—
1860	40,273		253.9%
1870	86,336		114.4%
1880	143,963		66.7%
1890	210,779		46.4%
1900	276,749		31.3%
1910	373,351		34.9%
1920	449,396		20.4%
1930	507,847		13.0%
1940	550,310		8.4%
1950	688,862		25.2%
1960	890,627		29.3%
1970	1,059,273		18.9%
1980	1,461,037		37.9%
1990	1,722,850		17.9%
2000	2,233,169		29.6%
2010	2,763,885		23.8%
2020	3,271,616		18.4%
2025 (est.)	3,538,904		8.2%
Source: 1910–2020

Ethnic composition as of the 2020 census
Race and Ethnicity	Alone	Total
White (non-Hispanic)	75.3%	78.9%
Hispanic or Latino (Note: Persons of Hispanic or Latino origin are not distinguished between total and partial ancestry.)	—	15.1%
Asian	2.4%	3.6%
African American (non-Hispanic)	1.1%	1.8%
Pacific Islander	1.1%	1.7%
Native American	0.9%	1.8%
Other	0.4%	1.1%

Map of counties in Utah by racial plurality, per the 2020 US Census Legend: | Non-Hispanic White 60–70% 70–80% 80–90% 90%+ | Native American 50–60% |

Historical racial demographics
Racial composition	1970	1990	2000	2010	2020
White (non-Hispanic)	97.4%	93.8%	89.2%	86.1%	75.3%
Hispanic (of any race)	4.1%	4.9%	9.0%	13.0%	15.1%
Asian	0.6%	1.9%	1.7%	2.0%	2.4%
Native (non-Hispanic)	1.1%	1.4%	1.3%	1.2%	0.9%
Black (non-Hispanic)	0.6%	0.7%	0.8%	1.0%	1.1%
Native Hawaiian and other Pacific Islander	–	–	0.7%	0.9%	1.1%
Other race	0.2%	2.2%	4.2%	6.0%	0.4%
Two or more races	–	–	2.1%	2.7%	3.7%

Utah – Racial and ethnic composition Note: the US Census treats Hispanic/Latino as an ethnic category. This table excludes Latinos from the racial categories and assigns them to a separate category. Hispanics/Latinos may be of any race.
Race / Ethnicity (NH = Non-Hispanic)	Pop 2000	Pop 2010	Pop 2020	% 2000	% 2010	% 2020
White alone (NH)	1,904,265	2,221,719	2,465,355	85.27%	80.38%	75.36%
Black or African American alone (NH)	16,137	25,951	37,192	0.72%	0.94%	1.14%
Native American or Alaska Native alone (NH)	26,663	27,081	28,690	1.19%	0.98%	0.88%
Asian alone (NH)	36,483	54,176	78,618	1.63%	1.96%	2.40%
Pacific Islander alone (NH)	14,806	23,909	35,831	0.66%	0.87%	1.10%
Other race alone (NH)	1,948	3,724	12,566	0.09%	0.13%	0.38%
Mixed race or Multiracial (NH)	31,308	48,985	120,452	1.40%	1.77%	3.68%
Hispanic or Latino (any race)	201,559	358,340	492,912	9.03%	12.97%	15.07%
Total	2,233,169	2,763,885	3,271,616	100.00%	100.00%	100.00%

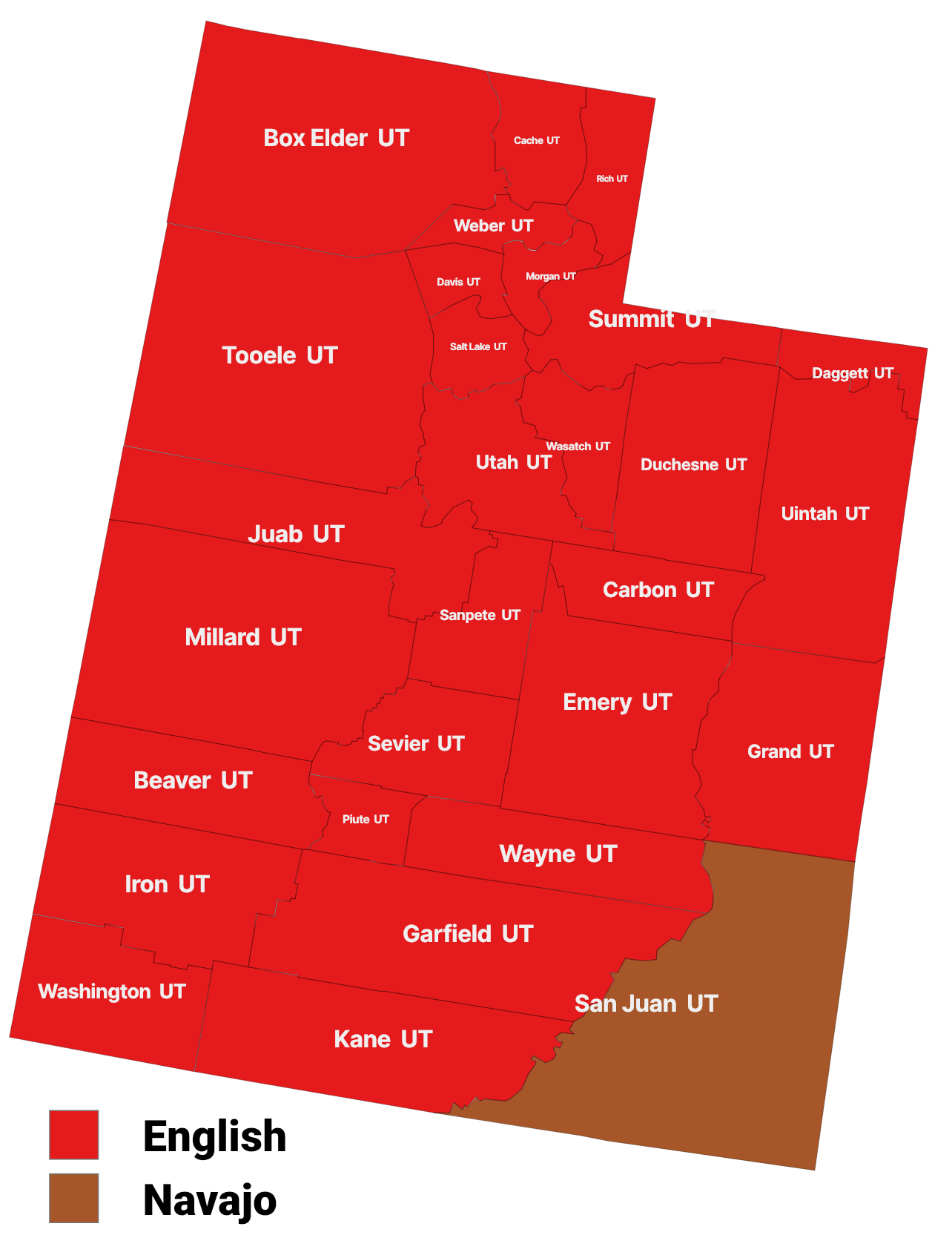
Largest alone or in any combination ethnic origin by county in Utah, per the 2020 census

The largest ancestry groups in the state are:

- 26.0% English
- 11.9% German
- 11.8% Scandinavian (5.4% Danish, 4.0% Swedish, 2.4% Norwegian)
- 9.0% Mexican
- 6.6% American
- 6.2% Irish
- 4.6% Scottish
- 2.7% Italian
- 2.4% Dutch
- 2.2% French
- 2.2% Welsh
- 1.4% Scotch Irish
- 1.3% Swiss

In 2011, 28.6% of Utah's population younger than the age of one were ethnic minorities, meaning they had at least one parent who was of a race other than non-Hispanic white.

=== Religion ===
Religion in Utah as of 2023-2024
Religion	Percent
Mormonism/Latter-day Saints	50%
Unaffiliated	34%
Protestant	8%
Catholic	4%
Buddhist	1%
Pagan or Wiccan	1%
Other faiths	<1%

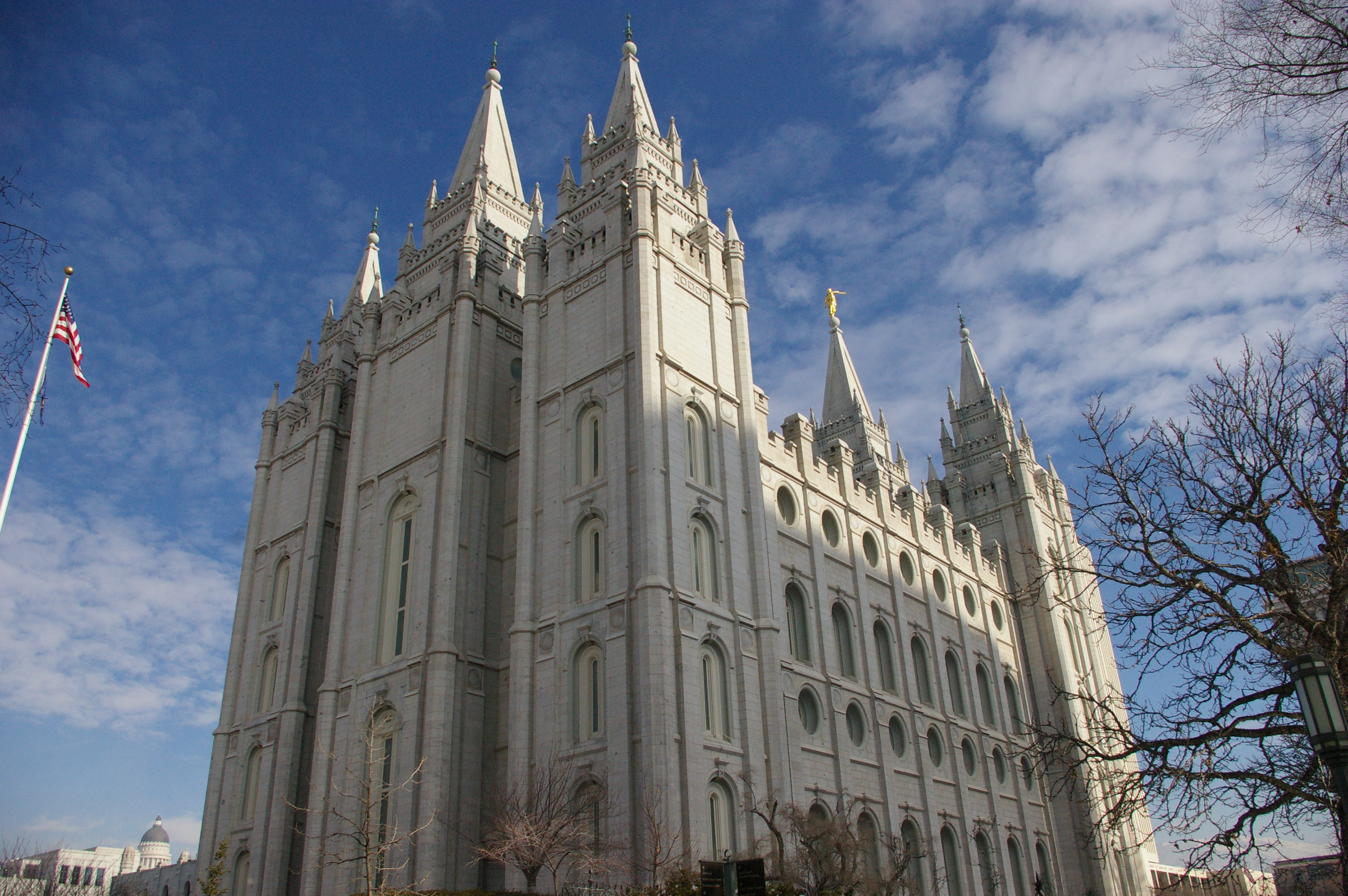
The LDS Salt Lake Temple, the primary attraction in the city's Temple Square

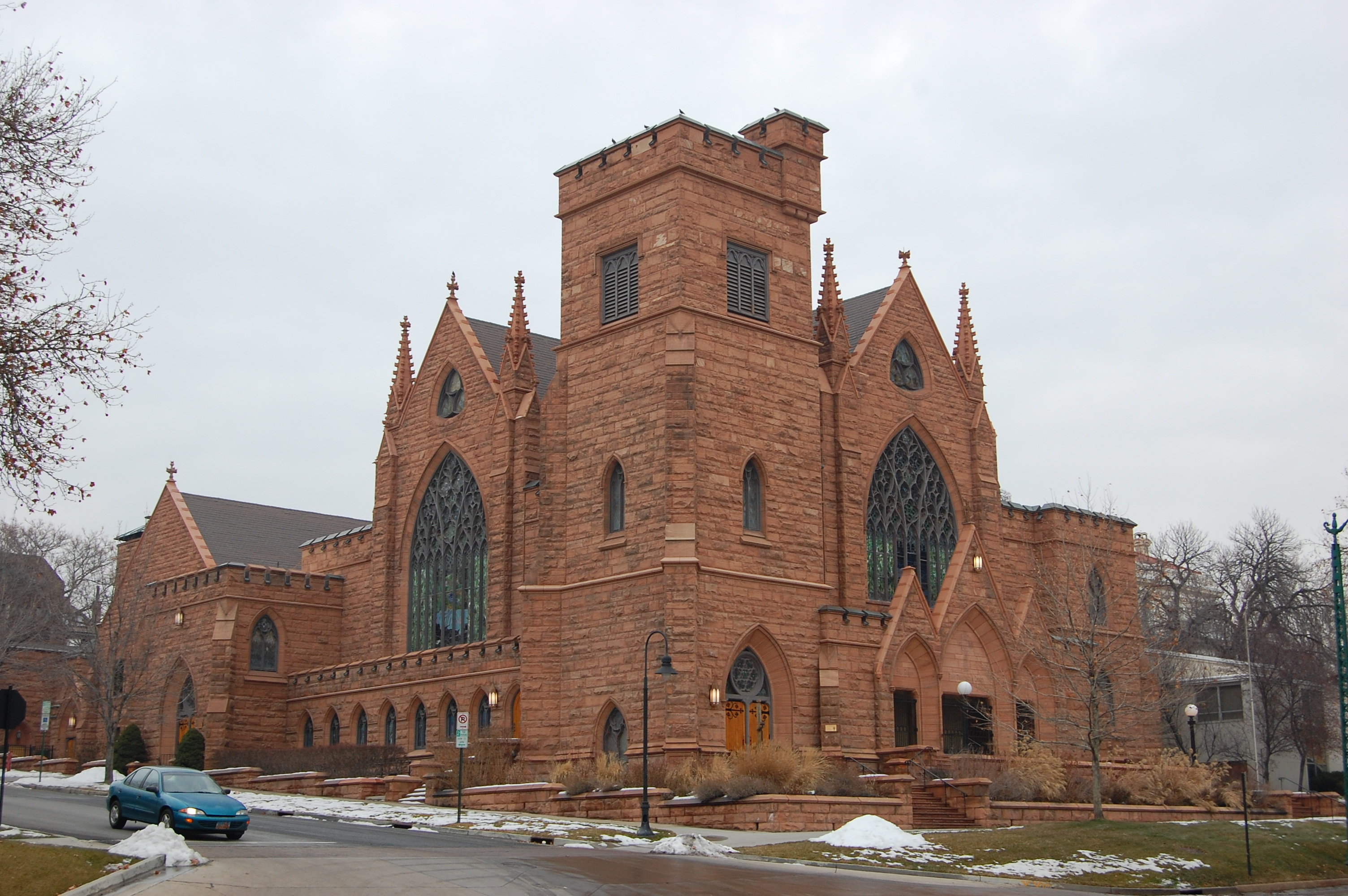
First Presbyterian Church in Salt Lake City

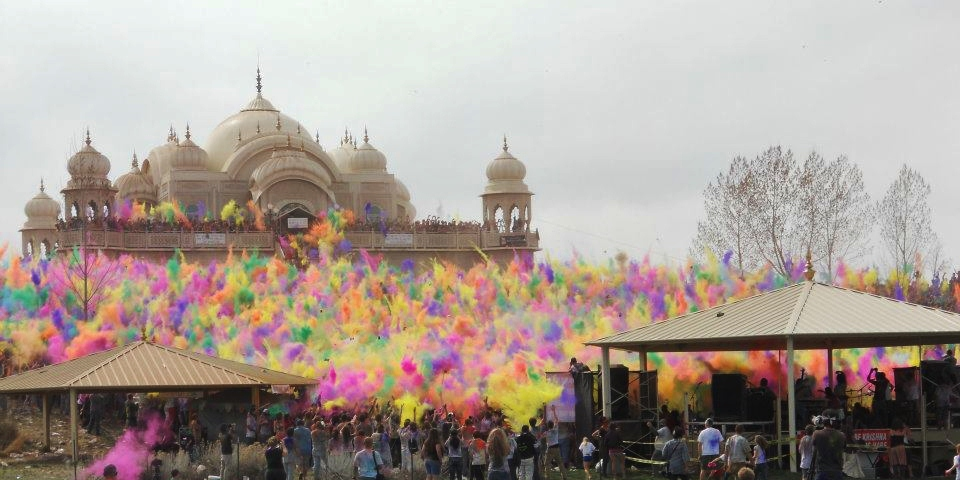
Sri Sri Radha Krishna (Hindu) Temple

Mormons are the largest religious group in Utah; however, the percentage of Mormons in the overall population has been decreasing. In 2017, 62.8% of Utahns were members of the LDS Church. This declined to 61.2% in 2018 and to 60.7% in 2019. Members of the LDS Church are 34%–41% of the people of Salt Lake City. Many of the other major population centers, such as Provo, Logan, Tooele, and St. George, are each mostly LDS, as are many suburban and rural areas. The LDS Church has the largest number of congregations, numbering 4,815 wards. According to results from the 2010 U.S. census, combined with official LDS Church membership statistics, church members represented 62.1% of Utah's total population. The Utah county with the lowest percentage of church members was Grand County, at 26.5%, while the county with the highest percentage was Morgan County, at 86.1%. In addition, the result for the most populated county, Salt Lake County, was 51.4%.

Though the LDS Church officially maintains a policy of neutrality in regard to political parties, the church's doctrine has a strong regional influence on politics. Another doctrine effect can be seen in Utah's high birth rate (25 percent higher than the national average; the highest for a state in the U.S.). Mormons in Utah tend to have conservative views when it comes to most political issues and the majority of voter-age Utahns are unaffiliated voters (60%) who vote overwhelmingly Republican. Mitt Romney received 72.8% of the Utahn votes in 2012, while John McCain polled 62.5% in the 2008 United States presidential election and 70.9% for George W. Bush in 2004. In 2010 the Association of Religion Data Archives (ARDA) reported that the three largest denominational groups in Utah are the LDS Church with 1,910,504 adherents; the Catholic Church with 160,125 adherents, and the Southern Baptist Convention with 12,593 adherents.

According to a Gallup poll, Utah had the third-highest number of people reporting as "Very Religious" in 2015, at 55% (trailing only Mississippi and Alabama). However, it was near the national average of people reporting as "Nonreligious" (31%), and featured the smallest percentage of people reporting as "Moderately Religious" (15%) of any state, being eight points lower than second-lowest state Vermont. In addition, it had the highest average weekly church attendance of any state, at 51%.

A 2023 paper challenged this perception, claiming only 42% of Utahns are Mormons; however, most statistics still show a majority of Utah residents belong to the LDS church. Estimates from the LDS church suggests 60.68% of Utah's population belongs to the church whilst some sources put the number as high as 68%. The paper replied that membership count done by the LDS Church is too high for several reasons.

=== Languages ===
The official language in the state of Utah is English. Utah English is primarily a merger of Northern and Midland American dialects carried west by LDS Church members, whose original New York dialect later incorporated features from northeast Ohio and central Illinois. Conspicuous in the speech of some in the central valley, although less frequent now in Salt Lake City, is a cord-card merger, so that the vowels /ɑ/ an /ɔ/ are pronounced the same before an /ɹ/, such as in the words cord and card.

In 2000, 87.5% of all state residents five years of age or older spoke only English at home, a decrease from 92.2% in 1990. In 2011, one-third of Utah's workforce was reported to be bilingual, developed through a program of acquisition of second languages beginning in elementary school, and related to Mormonism's missionary goals for its young people.

Top 14 Non-English Languages Spoken in Utah
Language	Percentage of population (as of 2010)
Spanish	7.4%
German	0.6%
Navajo	0.5%
French	0.4%
Pacific Island languages including Chamorro, Hawaiian, Ilocano, Tagalog, and Samoan	0.4%
Chinese	0.4%
Portuguese	0.3%
Vietnamese	0.3%
Japanese	0.2%
Arapaho	0.1%

=== Age and gender ===
Utah has the highest total birth rate and accordingly, the youngest population of any U.S. state. In 2010, the state's population was 50.2% male and 49.8% female. The life expectancy is 79.3 years.

== Economy ==
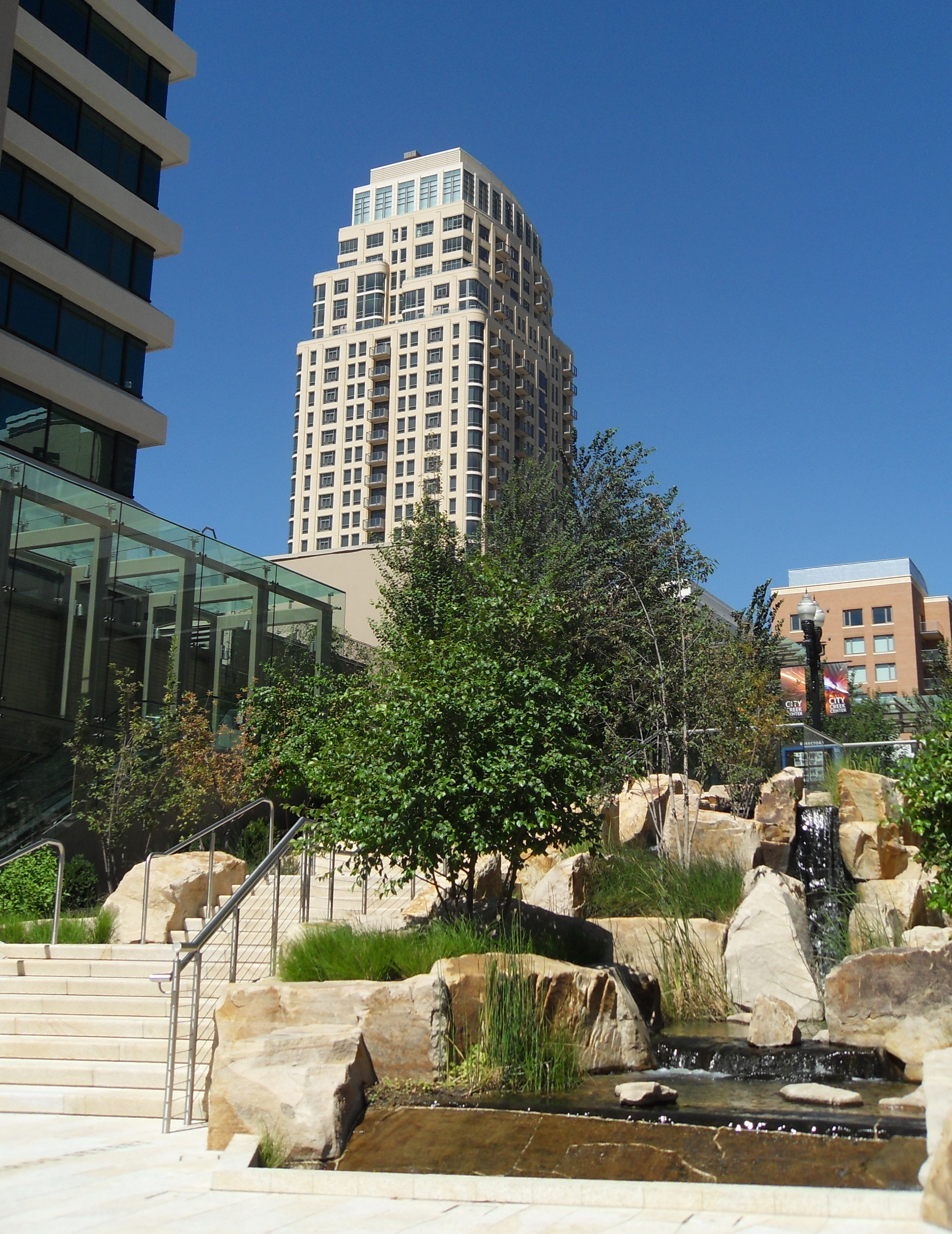
The Wasatch Front region has seen large growth and development despite the economic downturn. Shown is the City Creek Center project, a development in downtown Salt Lake City with a price tag of $1.5–2.5 billion.

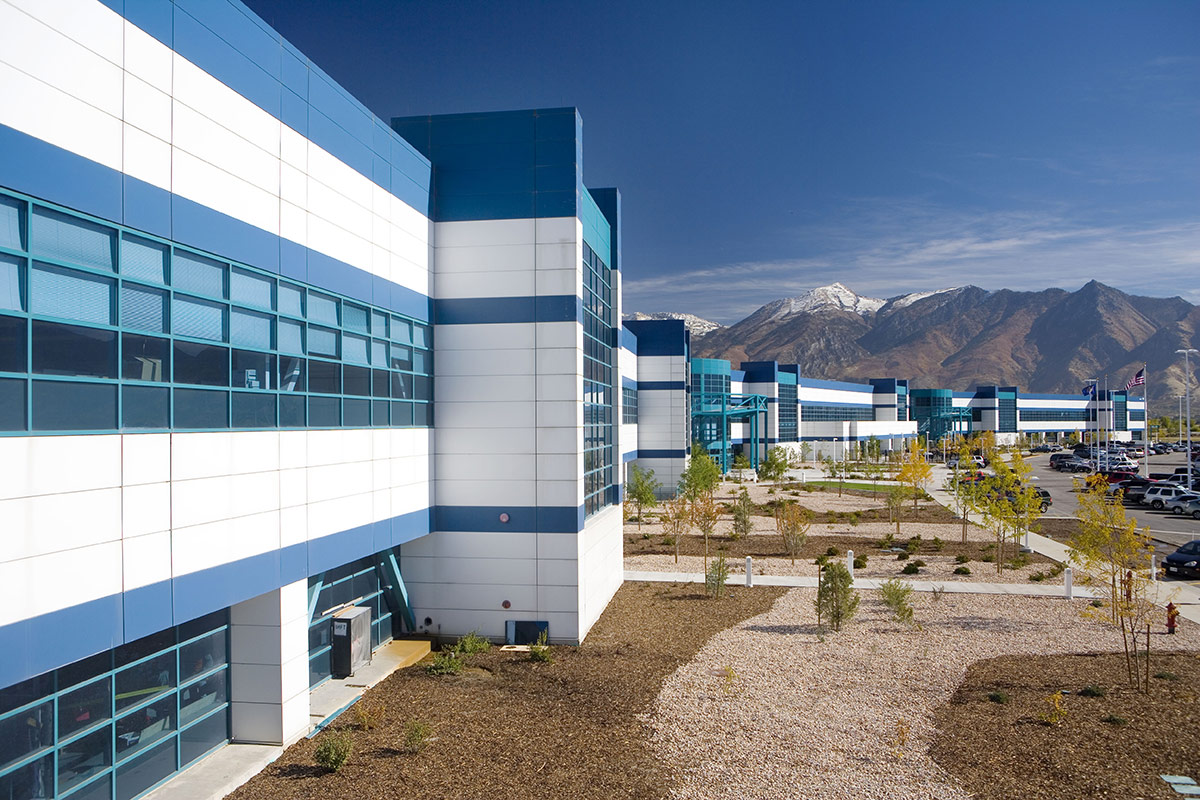
One out of every 14 flash memory chips in the world is produced in Lehi, Utah.

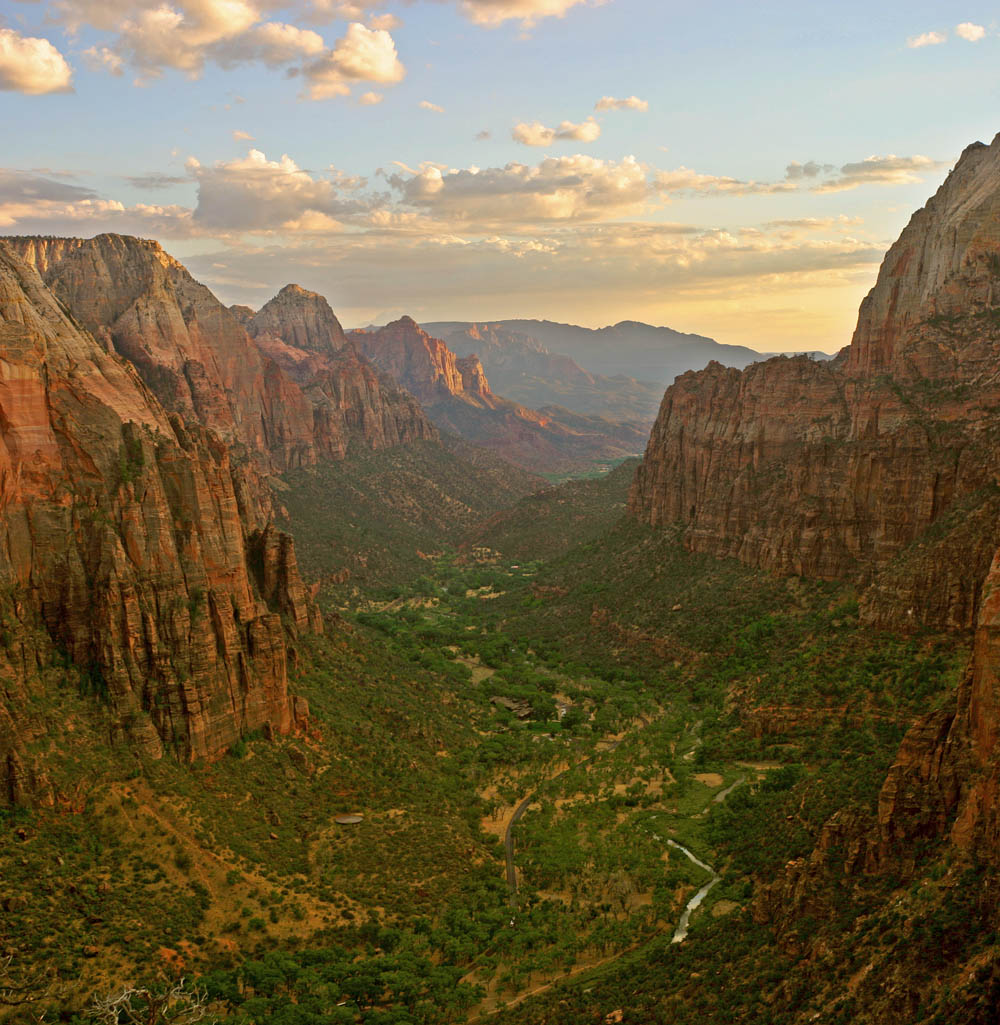
Zion National Park in southern Utah is one of five national parks in the state.

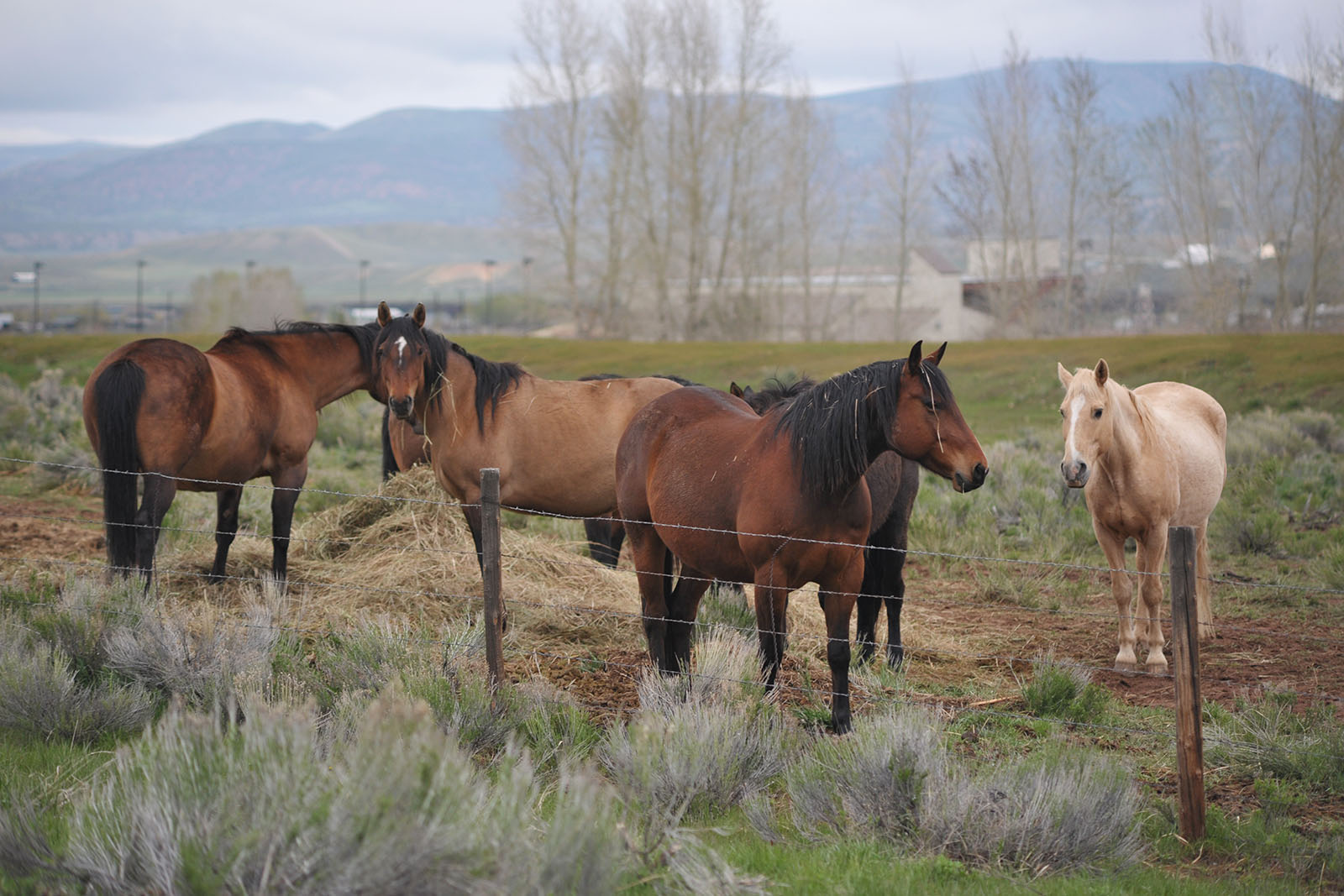
Farms and ranches

According to the Bureau of Economic Analysis, in 2025, Utah's gross state product was $315.9 billion and Utah's per capita personal income was $69,991.

Major industries of Utah include mining, cattle ranching, salt production, and government services.

According to the 2007 State New Economy Index, Utah has ranked the top state in the nation for Economic Dynamism, determined by "the degree to which state economies are knowledge-based, globalized, entrepreneurial, information technology-driven and innovation-based". In 2014, Utah was ranked number one in Forbes' list of "Best States For Business". A November 2010 article in Newsweek magazine highlighted Utah and particularly the Salt Lake City area's economic outlook, calling it "the new economic Zion", and examined how the area has been able to bring in high-paying jobs and attract high-tech corporations to the area during a recession. As of May 2025, the state's unemployment rate was 3.2%. In terms of "small business friendliness", in 2014 Utah emerged as number one, based on a study drawing upon data from more than 12,000 small business owners. In 2025, 99.4% of businesses in the state were small businesses, and employed 45.4% of Utah's workforce.

In eastern Utah petroleum production is a major industry. Near Salt Lake City, petroleum refining is done by several oil companies. In central Utah, coal production accounts for much of the mining activity.

According to Internal Revenue Service tax returns, Utahns rank first among all U.S. states in the proportion of income given to charity by the wealthy. This is due to the standard ten percent of all earnings that Mormons give to the LDS Church. According to the Corporation for National and Community Service, Utah had an average of 884,000 volunteers between 2008 and 2010, each of whom contributed 89.2 hours per volunteer. This figure equates to $3.8 billion of service contributed, ranking Utah number one for volunteerism in the nation.

=== Taxation ===
Utah collects personal income tax; for tax year 2024 the tax is a flat 4.55% for all taxpayers. This rate has been steadily decreasing by 0.05% points yearly since 2008, when it was at 5%. The state sales tax has a base rate of 6.45 percent, with cities and counties levying additional local sales taxes that vary among the municipalities. Property taxes are assessed and collected locally. Utah does not charge intangible property taxes and does not impose an inheritance tax.

=== Tourism ===
Tourism is a major industry in Utah. With five national parks (Arches, Bryce Canyon, Canyonlands, Capitol Reef, and Zion), Utah has the third most national parks of any state after Alaska and California. In addition, Utah features nine national monuments (Cedar Breaks, Dinosaur, Grand Staircase–Escalante, Hovenweep, Natural Bridges, Bears Ears, Rainbow Bridge, Timpanogos Cave), and Jurassic, two national recreation areas (Flaming Gorge and Glen Canyon), seven national forests (Ashley, Caribou-Targhee, Dixie, Fishlake, Manti-La Sal, Sawtooth, and Uinta-Wasatch-Cache), and numerous state parks and monuments.

The Moab area, in the southeastern part of the state, is known for its challenging mountain biking trails, including Slickrock. Moab also hosts the famous Moab Jeep Safari semiannually.

Utah has seen an increase in tourism since the 2002 Winter Olympics. Park City is home to the United States Ski Team. Utah's ski resorts are primarily located in northern Utah near Salt Lake City, Park City, Ogden, and Provo. Between 2007 and 2011 Deer Valley Park City, has been ranked the top ski resort in North America in a survey organized by Ski Magazine.

Utah has many significant ski resorts. The 2009 Ski Magazine reader survey concluded that six of the top ten resorts deemed most "accessible", and six of the top ten with the best snow conditions, were located in Utah. In Southern Utah, Brian Head Ski Resort is located in the mountains near Cedar City. Former Olympic venues including Utah Olympic Park and Utah Olympic Oval are still in operation for training and competition and allow the public to participate in numerous activities including ski jumping, bobsleigh, and speed skating.

Utah features many cultural attractions such as Temple Square, the Sundance Film Festival, the Red Rock Film Festival, the DOCUTAH Film Festival, the Utah Data Center, and the Utah Shakespeare Festival. Temple Square is ranked as the 16th most visited tourist attraction in the United States by Forbes magazine, with more than five million annual visitors.

Other attractions include Monument Valley, the Great Salt Lake, the Bonneville Salt Flats, and Lake Powell.

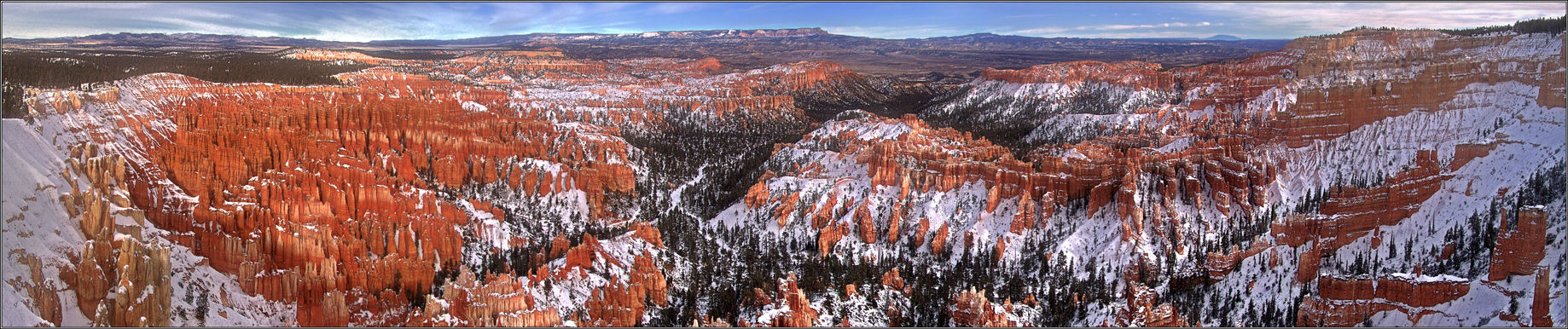
Bryce Canyon National Park Amphitheater (winter view)

==== Branding ====
The state of Utah relies heavily on income from tourists and travelers visiting the state's parks and ski resorts, and thus the need to "brand" Utah and create an impression of the state throughout the world has led to several state slogans, the most famous of which is "The Greatest Snow on Earth", which has been in use in Utah officially since 1975 (although the slogan was in unofficial use as early as 1962) and now adorns nearly 50 percent of the state's license plates. In 2001, Utah Governor Mike Leavitt approved a new state slogan, "Utah! Where Ideas Connect", which lasted until March 10, 2006, when the Utah Travel Council and the office of Governor Jon Huntsman announced that "Life Elevated" would be the new state slogan.

=== Mining ===
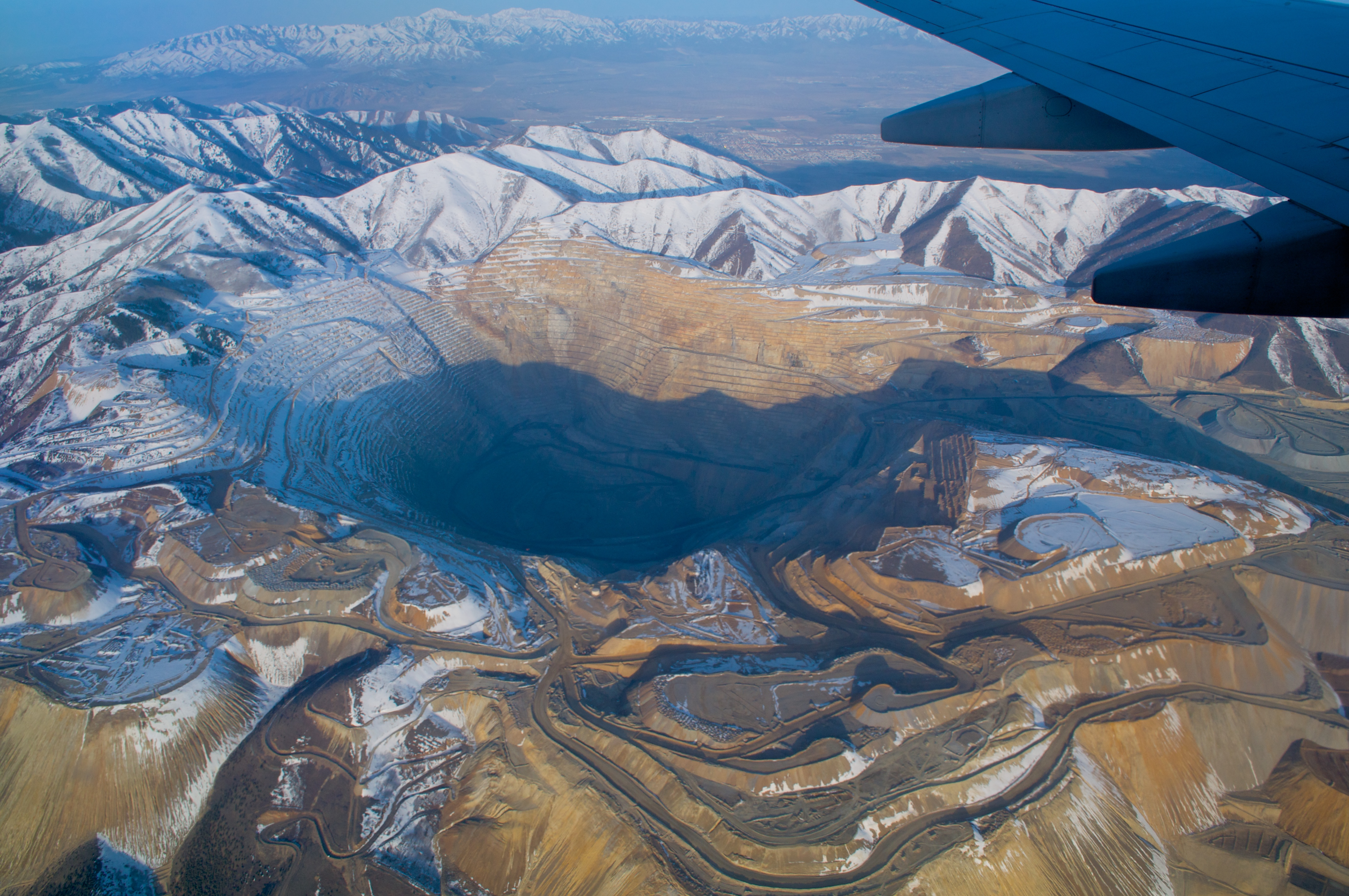
Mining has been a large industry in Utah since it was first settled. The Bingham Canyon Mine in Salt Lake County is one of the largest open pit mines in the world.

Beginning in the late 19th century with the state's mining boom (including the Bingham Canyon Mine, among the world's largest open pit mines), companies attracted large numbers of immigrants with job opportunities. Since the days of the Utah Territory, mining has played a major role in Utah's economy. Historical mining towns include Mercur in Tooele County, Silver Reef in Washington County, Eureka in Juab County, Park City in Summit County, and numerous coal mining camps throughout Carbon County such as Castle Gate, Spring Canyon, and Hiawatha.

These settlements were characteristic of the boom and bust cycle that dominated mining towns of the American West. Park City, Utah, and Alta, Utah were boom towns in the early twentieth century. Rich silver mines in the mountains adjacent to the towns led to many people flocking to the towns in search of wealth. During the early part of the Cold War era, uranium was mined in eastern Utah. Today, mining activity still plays a major role in the state's economy. Minerals mined in Utah include copper, gold, silver, molybdenum, zinc, lead, and beryllium. Fossil fuels including coal, petroleum, and natural gas continue to play a large role in Utah's economy, especially in the eastern part of the state in counties such as Carbon, Emery, Grand, and Uintah.

=== Energy ===
Utah extracts more coal and generates more electricity than it consumes. The state has the potential to generate 31.6 TWh/year from 13.1 GW of wind power, and 10,290 TWh/year from solar power using 4,048 GW of photovoltaic (PV), including 5.6 GW of rooftop photovoltaic, and 1,638 GW of concentrated solar power.

Utah Associated Municipal Power Systems (UAMPS) is a subdivision of the State of Utah, providing non-profit wholesale electricity, transmission, and other energy services to community-owned power systems in the Intermountain West geographical area.

== Transportation ==
=== Road ===
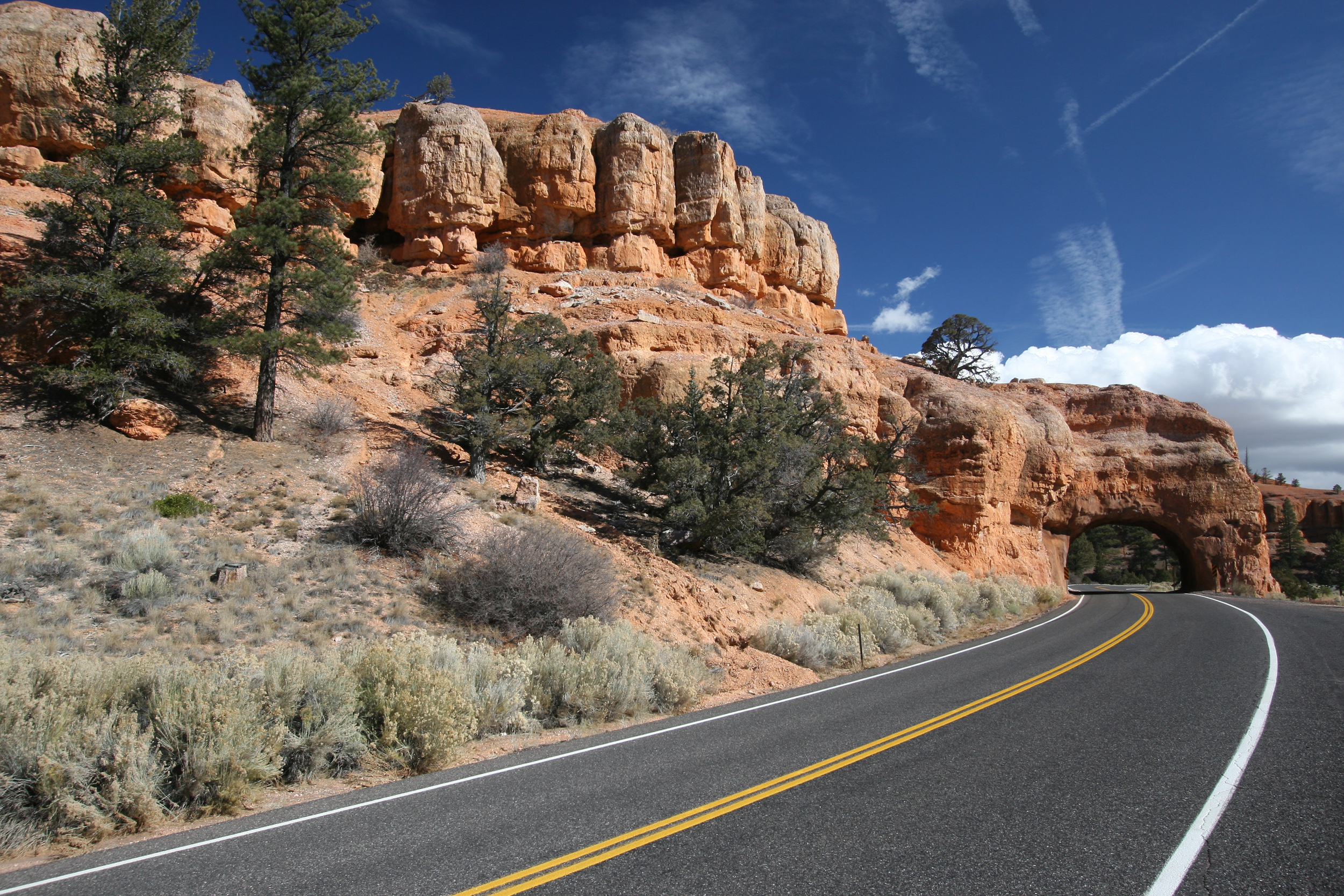
Utah State Route 12 through Red Canyon in Dixie National Forest

I-15 and I-80 are the main interstate highways in the state, where they intersect and briefly merge near downtown Salt Lake City. I-15 traverses the state north-to-south, entering from Arizona near St. George, paralleling the Wasatch Front, and crossing into Idaho near Portage. I-80 spans northern Utah east-to-west, entering from Nevada at Wendover, crossing the Wasatch Mountains east of Salt Lake City, and entering Wyoming near Evanston. I-84 West enters from Idaho near Snowville (from Boise) and merges with I-15 from Tremonton to Ogden, then heads southeast through the Wasatch Mountains before terminating at I-80 near Echo Junction.

I-70 splits from I-15 at Cove Fort in central Utah and heads east through mountains and rugged desert terrain, providing quick access to the many national parks and national monuments of southern Utah, and has been noted for its beauty. The 103 mi (166 km) stretch from Salina to Green River is the country's longest stretch of interstate without services and, when completed in 1970, was the longest stretch of entirely new highway constructed in the U.S. since the Alaska Highway was completed in 1943.

=== Rail and transit ===
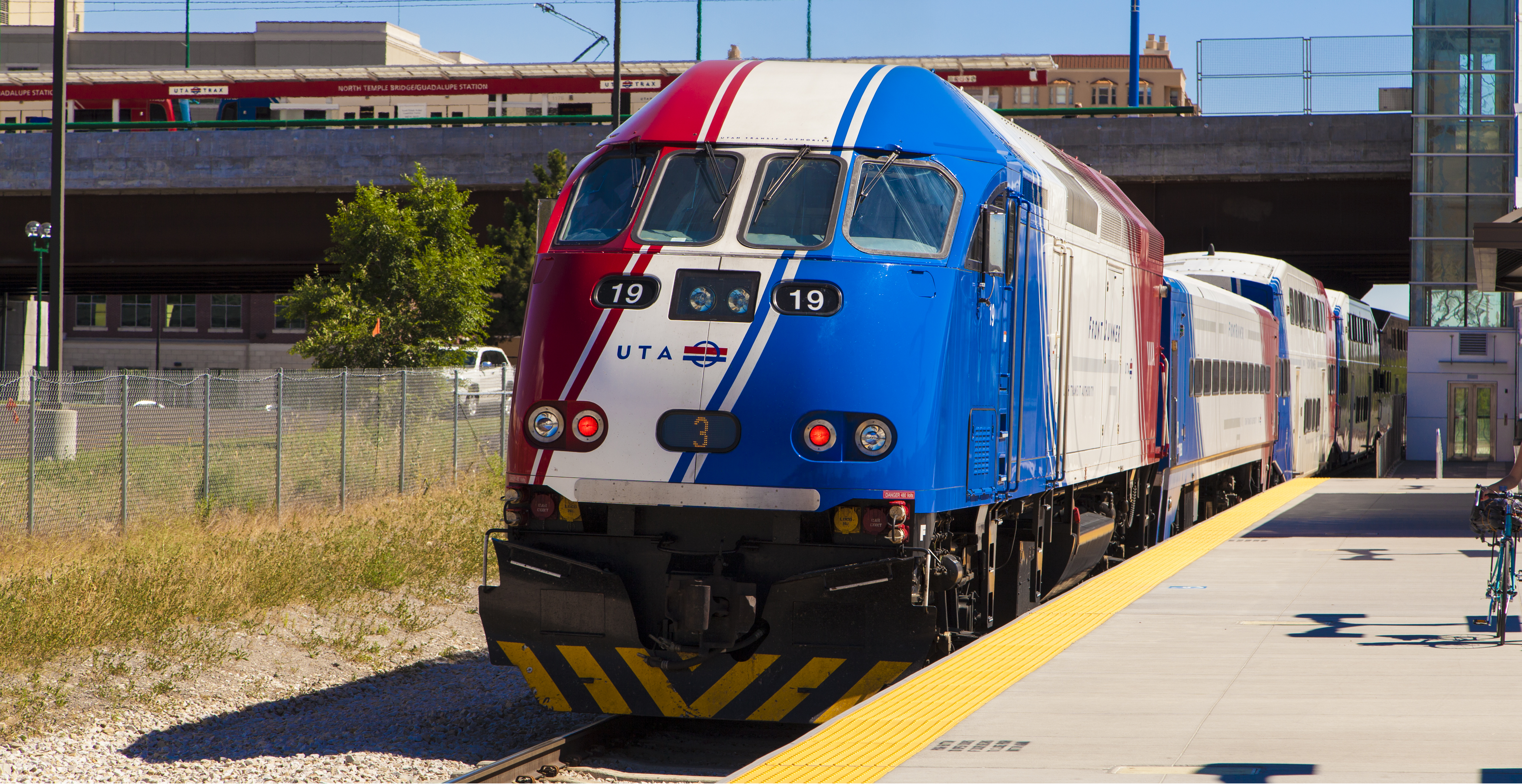
FrontRunner commuter rail runs between Ogden and Provo via Salt Lake City

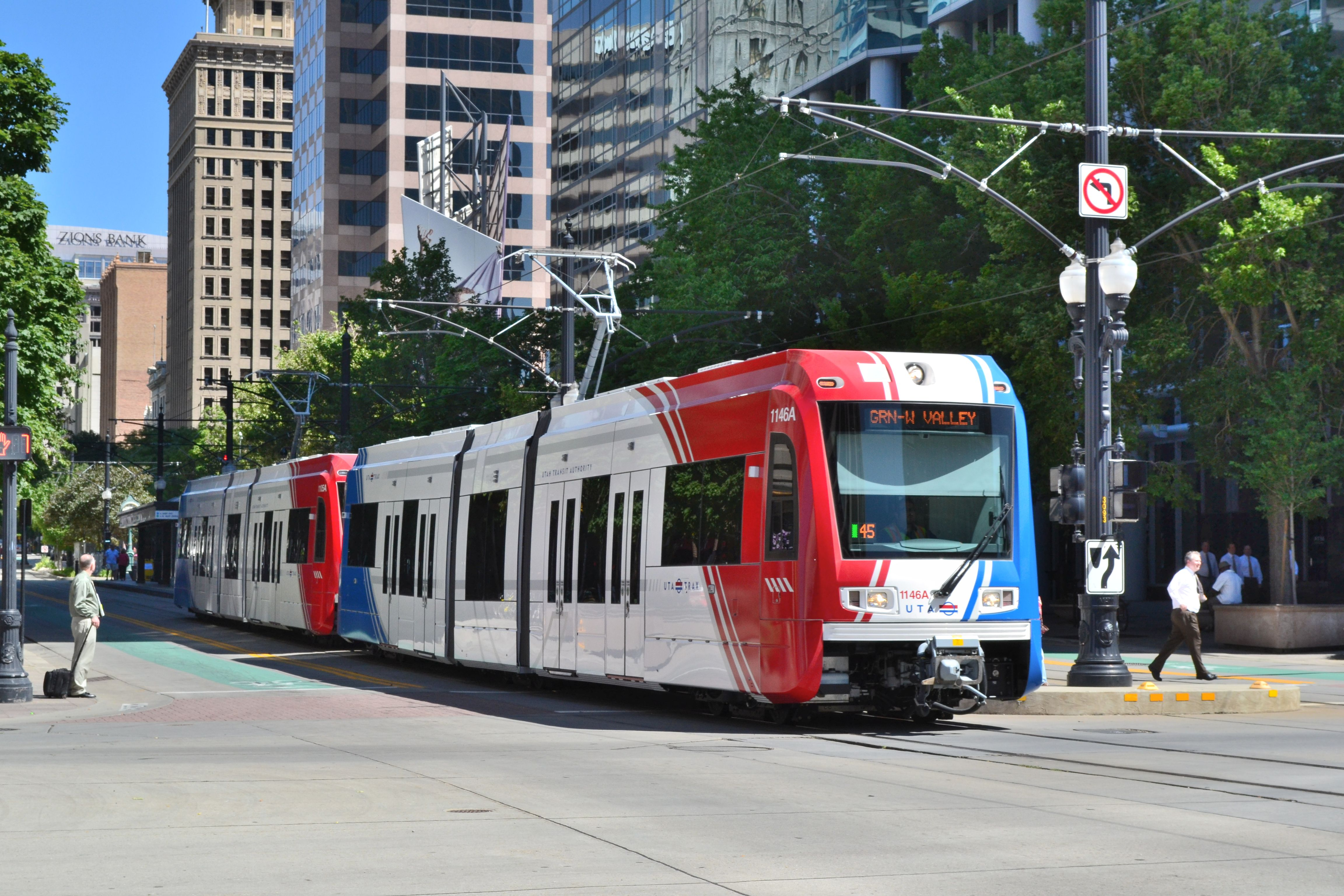
TRAX light rail serves Salt Lake County

Utah's Class I freight railroads are the BNSF Railway and the Union Pacific Railway. Interstate passenger rail is provided by Amtrak's daily California Zephyr train, which runs between Chicago Union Station and Emeryville, California, with stops in Utah at Green River, Helper, Provo, and the Salt Lake City Intermodal Hub. The state was previously served by Amtrak's Pioneer and Desert Wind trains. Heritage railroads include the Heber Valley Railroad and the Wild Kingdom Train.

The Utah Transit Authority (UTA) operates public transport services throughout the Wasatch Front region. TRAX, the UTA's light rail system, consists of three lines. The Blue Line (formerly Salt Lake/Sandy Line) begins in the suburb of Draper and ends in Downtown Salt Lake City. The Red Line (Mid-Jordan/University Line) begins in the Daybreak Community of South Jordan, a southwestern valley suburb, and ends at the University of Utah. The Green Line begins in West Valley City, passes through downtown Salt Lake City, and ends at Salt Lake City International Airport. The UTA also operates FrontRunner, a commuter rail line running between Ogden and Provo via Salt Lake City.

The UTA's bus system stretches from the Salt Lake Valley west to Grantsville and east to Park City. Beyond UTA, the cities of Cedar City, Logan, Park City, and St. George are served by local bus operators. In the winter, the UTA and several private bus companies operate shuttle routes to Utah's ski resorts.

=== Air ===
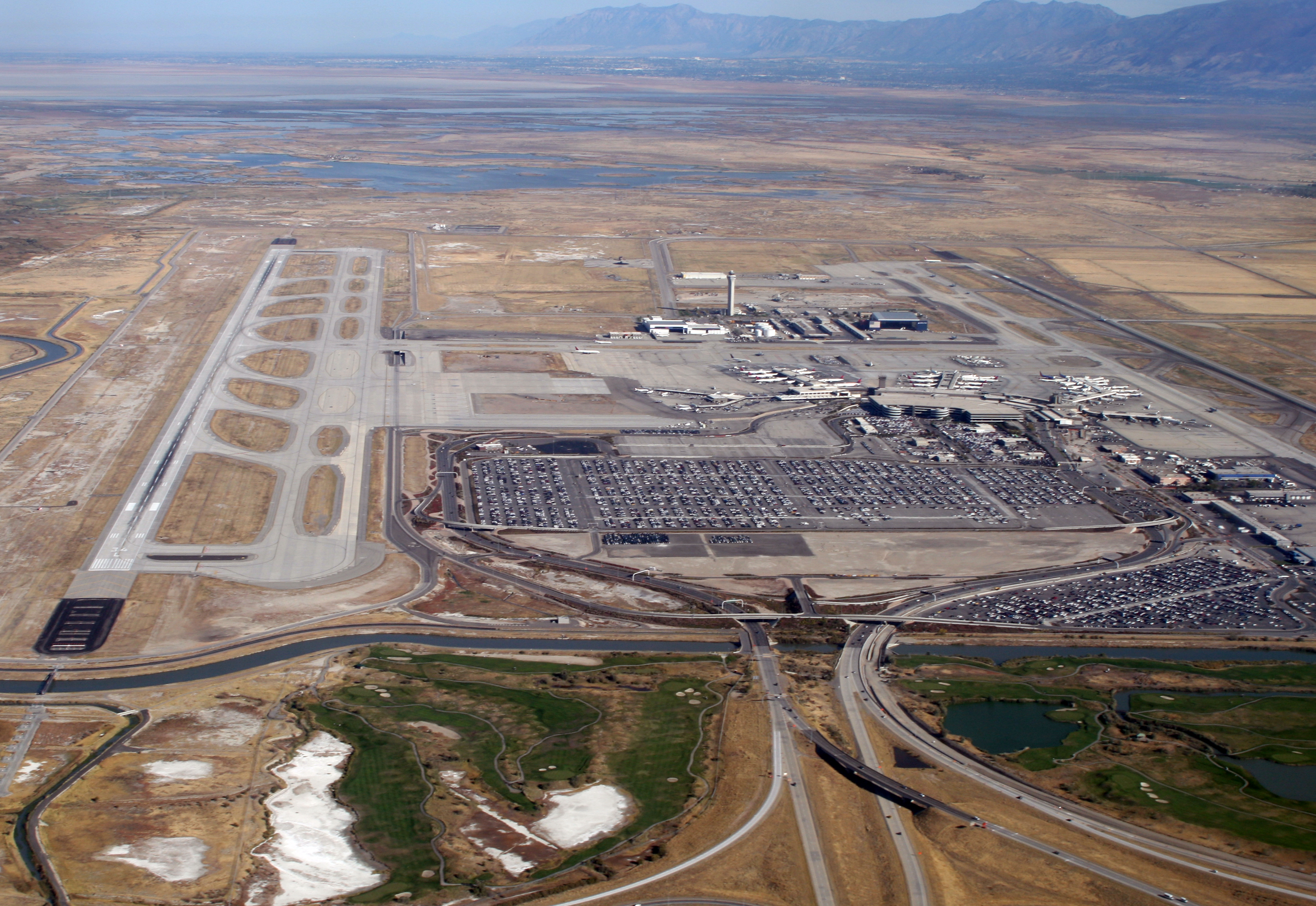
Salt Lake International Airport is the largest airport in Utah

Salt Lake City International Airport is the only international airport in the state and serves as a hub for Delta Air Lines. The airport has consistently ranked first in on-time departures and had the fewest cancellations among U.S. airports. The airport has non-stop service to more than a hundred destinations throughout the United States, Canada, and Mexico, as well as to Amsterdam, London and Paris. Canyonlands Field (near Moab), Cedar City Regional Airport, Ogden-Hinckley Airport, Provo Municipal Airport, St. George Regional Airport, and Vernal Regional Airport all provide limited commercial air service. A new regional airport at St. George opened on January 12, 2011. SkyWest Airlines is also headquartered in St. George and maintains a hub in Salt Lake City.

== Law and government ==
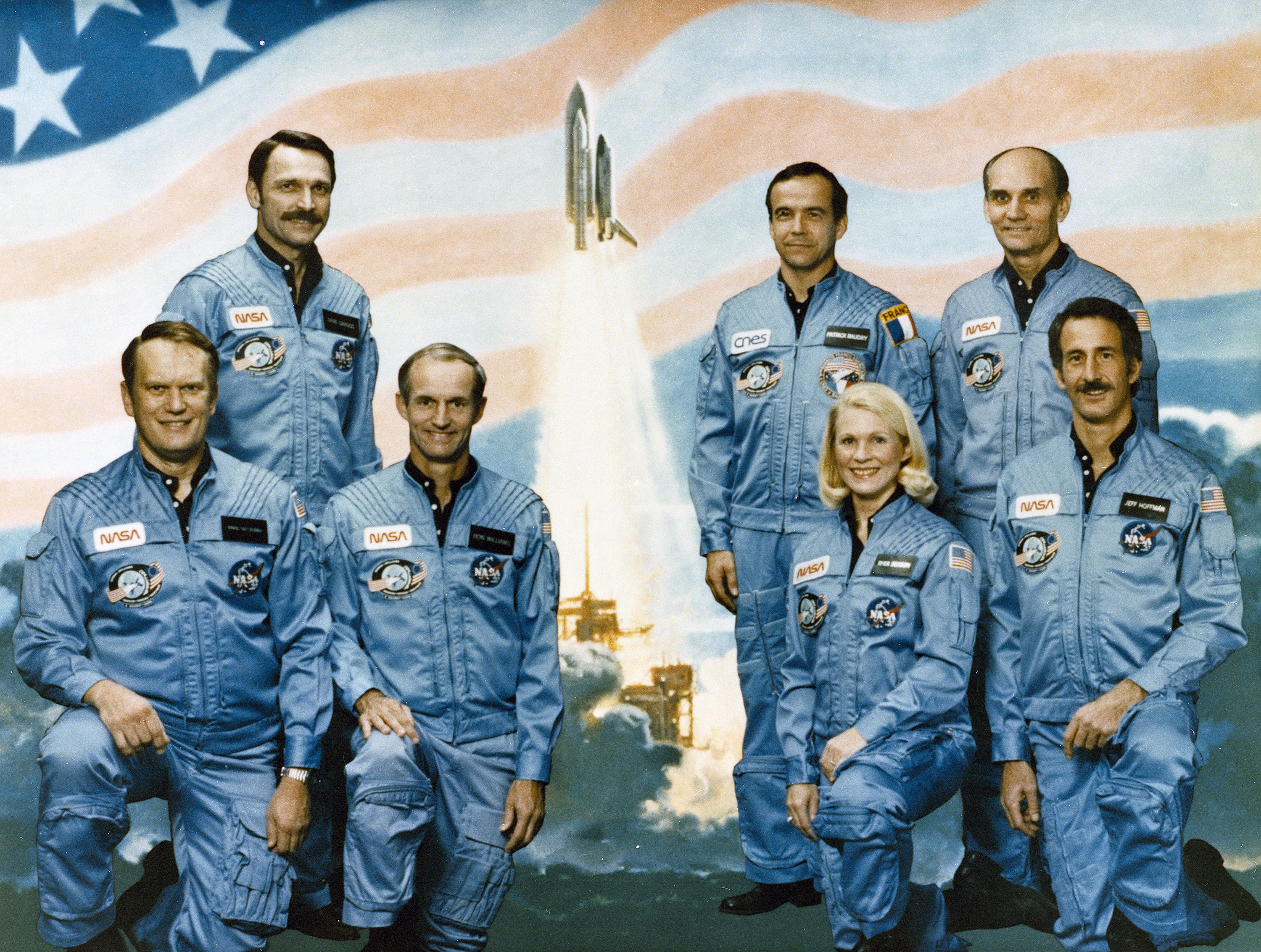
Jake Garn (top-right), former Senator of Utah (1974–1993), and astronaut on Space Shuttle flight STS-51-D

Utah government is divided into three branches: executive, legislative, and judicial. The governor is the chief executive of the state and elected for a four-year term; a lieutenant governor is concurrently elected on a joint ticket with the governor. The current governor of Utah is Spencer Cox, who was sworn in on January 4, 2021. In addition to the governor and lieutenant governor, Utah has three other independently elected executive officers: a state auditor, a state treasurer, and an attorney general.

As of 2024, J. Bracken Lee (1949–1957) was the most recent of three Governors of Utah who was not a member of the Church of Jesus Christ of Latter-day Saints (LDS Church), the other two being Simon Bamberger (1917–1921) and George Dern (1925–1933).

The Utah State Legislature consists of a Senate and a House of Representatives. State senators serve four-year terms and representatives two-year terms. The Utah Legislature meets each year in January for an annual 45-day session.

The Utah Supreme Court is the court of last resort in Utah. It consists of five justices, who are appointed by the governor, and then subject to retention election. The Utah Court of Appeals handles cases from the trial courts. Trial level courts are the district courts and justice courts. All justices and judges, like those on the Utah Supreme Court, are subject to retention election after appointment.

In a 2020 study, Utah was ranked as the 3rd easiest state for citizens to vote in.

=== Counties ===
Utah is divided into political jurisdictions designated as counties. Since 1918 there have been 29 counties in the state, ranging from 298 to 7,819 square miles (772 to 20,300 km^{2}).

County name	County seat	Year founded	2020 U.S. census	Largest city in county	Percent of total	Area	% of state
Beaver	Beaver	1856	7,072	Beaver	0.22%	2,589 sq mi (6,710 km^{2})	3.2%
Box Elder	Brigham City	1856	57,666	Brigham City	1.76%	5,745 sq mi (14,880 km^{2})	7.0%
Cache	Logan	1856	133,154	Logan	4.07%	1,164 sq mi (3,010 km^{2})	1.4%
Carbon	Price	1894	20,412	Price	0.62%	1,478 sq mi (3,830 km^{2})	1.8%
Daggett	Manila	1918	935	Manila	0.03%	696 sq mi (1,800 km^{2})	0.8%
Davis	Farmington	1852	362,679	Layton	11.09%	298 sq mi (770 km^{2})	0.4%
Duchesne	Duchesne	1915	19,596	Roosevelt	0.60%	3,240 sq mi (8,400 km^{2})	3.9%
Emery	Castle Dale	1880	9,825	Huntington	0.30%	4,462 sq mi (11,560 km^{2})	5.4%
Garfield	Panguitch	1882	5,051	Panguitch	0.15%	5,175 sq mi (13,400 km^{2})	6.3%
Grand	Moab	1890	9,669	Moab	0.30%	3,671 sq mi (9,510 km^{2})	4.5%
Iron	Parowan	1852	57,289	Cedar City	1.75%	3,296 sq mi (8,540 km^{2})	4.0%
Juab	Nephi	1852	11,786	Nephi	0.36%	3,392 sq mi (8,790 km^{2})	4.1%
Kane	Kanab	1864	7,667	Kanab	0.23%	3,990 sq mi (10,300 km^{2})	4.9%
Millard	Fillmore	1852	12,975	Delta	0.40%	6,572 sq mi (17,020 km^{2})	8.0%
Morgan	Morgan	1862	12,295	Morgan	0.38%	609 sq mi (1,580 km^{2})	0.7%
Piute	Junction	1865	1,438	Circleville	0.04%	757 sq mi (1,960 km^{2})	0.9%
Rich	Randolph	1868	2,510	Garden City	0.08%	1,028 sq mi (2,660 km^{2})	1.3%
Salt Lake	Salt Lake City	1852	1,185,238	Salt Lake City	36.23%	742 sq mi (1,920 km^{2})	0.9%
San Juan	Monticello	1880	14,518	Blanting	0.44%	7,819 sq mi (20,250 km^{2})	9.5%
Sanpete	Manti	1852	28,437	Ephraim	0.87%	1,590 sq mi (4,100 km^{2})	1.9%
Sevier	Richfield	1865	21,522	Richfield	0.66%	1,910 sq mi (4,900 km^{2})	2.3%
Summit	Coalville	1854	42,357	Park City	1.29%	1,871 sq mi (4,850 km^{2})	2.3%
Tooele	Tooele	1852	72,698	Tooele	2.22%	6,941 sq mi (17,980 km^{2})	8.4%
Uintah	Vernal	1880	35,620	Vernal	1.09%	4,479 sq mi (11,600 km^{2})	5.5%
Utah	Provo	1852	659,399	Provo	20.16%	2,003 sq mi (5,190 km^{2})	2.4%
Wasatch	Heber	1862	34,788	Heber	1.06%	1,175 sq mi (3,040 km^{2})	1.4%
Washington	St. George	1852	180,279	St. George	5.51%	2,426 sq mi (6,280 km^{2})	3.0%
Wayne	Loa	1892	2,486	Loa	0.08%	2,460 sq mi (6,400 km^{2})	3.0%
Weber	Ogden	1852	262,223	Ogden	8.02%	576 sq mi (1,490 km^{2})	0.7%

- Total Counties: 29
- Total 2020 population: 3,271,616
- Total state area: 82,154 sq mi (212,780 km^{2})

=== Women's rights ===
Utah granted full voting rights to women in 1870, 26 years before becoming a state. Among all U.S. states, only Wyoming granted suffrage to women earlier. However, in 1887 the initial Edmunds-Tucker Act was passed by Congress to curtail Mormon influence in the territorial government. One of the provisions of the Act was the repeal of women's suffrage; full suffrage was not returned until Utah was admitted to the Union in 1896.

Utah is one of the 15 states that have not ratified the U.S. Equal Rights Amendment. Abortion in Utah is legal prior to the 18th week of pregnancy.

=== Free-range parenting ===
In March 2018, Utah passed the United States' first "free-range parenting" bill. The bill was signed into law by Republican Governor Gary Herbert and states that parents who allow their children to engage in certain activities without supervision are not considered neglectful.

=== Dual Language Immersion ===
In 2008, Senate Bill 41 established a state-sponsored Dual Language Immersion program. Utah has one of the most robust language immersion programs in the country, with more than 270 schools and over 70,000 students. The program is a 50/50 model, with half the instruction in English and half in the target language (Spanish, Chinese, French, Portuguese, German, or Russian).

=== Constitution ===
The constitution of Utah was enacted on May 8, 1895. Notably, the constitution outlawed polygamy, as requested by Congress when Utah had applied for statehood, and reestablished the territorial practice of women's suffrage. Utah's Constitution has been amended many times since its inception.

=== Capital punishment ===
Under Utah law, aggravated murder is the only crime subject to the penalty of death. Utah was the first state to resume executions after the 1972–1976 national moratorium on capital punishment ended with Gregg v. Georgia, when Gary Gilmore was executed by firing squad in 1977. Utah is one of only two states to have ever carried out executions by firing squad, and the only one to do so after the moratorium ended.

=== Alcohol, tobacco, and gambling laws ===
Utah's laws regarding alcohol, tobacco and gambling are strict. Utah is an alcoholic beverage control state. The Utah Department of Alcoholic Beverage Control regulates the sale of alcohol; wine and spirituous liquors may be purchased only at state liquor stores, and local laws may prohibit the sale of beer and other alcoholic beverages on Sundays. The state bans the sale of fruity alcoholic drinks at grocery stores and convenience stores. The law states that such drinks must now have new state-approved labels on the front of the products that contain capitalized letters in bold type telling consumers the drinks contain alcohol and at what percentage. Utah is the only state that imposes a maximum blood alcohol content (BAC) of 0.05% for drivers, as opposed to the 0.08% limit in other states. The Utah Indoor Clean Air Act is a statewide smoking ban that prohibits it in many public places. Utah and Hawaii are the only two states in the United States to outlaw all forms of gambling.

=== Same-sex marriage ===
Same-sex marriage became legal in Utah on December 20, 2013, when U.S. District Court Judge Robert J. Shelby issued a ruling in Kitchen v. Herbert. As of close of business December 26, more than 1,225 marriage licenses were issued, with at least 74 percent, or 905 licenses, issued to gay and lesbian couples. The Utah Attorney General's office was granted a stay of the ruling by the U.S. Supreme Court on January 6, 2014, while the Tenth Circuit Court of Appeals considered the case. On October 6, 2014, the U.S. Supreme Court declined a writ of certiorari, and the 10th Circuit Court issued their mandate later that day, lifting their stay. Same-sex marriages commenced again in Utah that day.

=== LGBT rights ===
The rights of lesbian, gay, bisexual, transgender, and queer (LGBTQ) people in the U.S. state of Utah have significantly evolved in the 21st century. Protective laws have become increasingly enacted since 2014, despite the state's reputation as socially conservative and highly religious. Utah's anti-sodomy law was invalidated in 2003 by Lawrence v. Texas, and fully repealed by the state legislature in 2019. Same-sex marriage has been legal since the state's ban was ruled unconstitutional by federal courts in 2014. In addition, statewide anti-discrimination laws now cover sexual orientation and gender identity in employment and housing, and the use of conversion therapy on minors is prohibited. In spite of this, there are still a few differences between the treatment of LGBTQ people and the rest of the population, and the rights of transgender youth are restricted.

Opinion polling has shown an increase in support for LGBT rights in the state. A 2017 Public Religion Research Institute poll showed that 44% of Utah residents supported same-sex marriage, a significant increase from the early 2000s. A 2019 survey by the same pollster showed that 74% of Utahns supported anti-discrimination legislation protecting LGBTQ people. Salt Lake City, the largest city in the state, has one of the largest LGBTQ populations per capita in the country.

=== Politics ===
Party registration in Utah as of October 21, 2024
Party	Total voters	Percentage
Republican	1,016,409	50.17%
Unaffiliated	587,128	28.98%
Democratic	286,990	14.17%
Other	135,227	6.68%
Total	2,025,754	100.00%

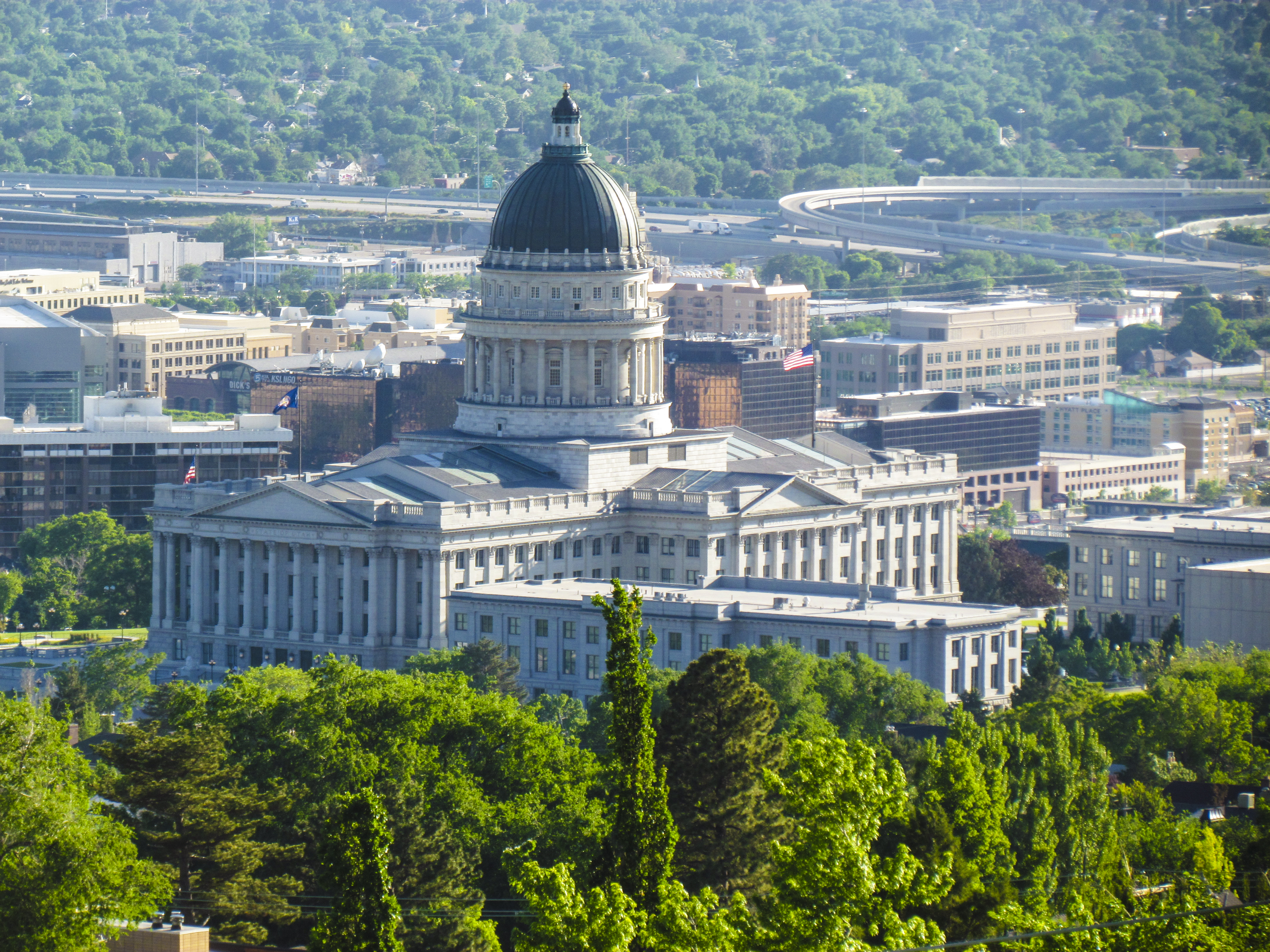
The Utah State Capitol, Salt Lake City

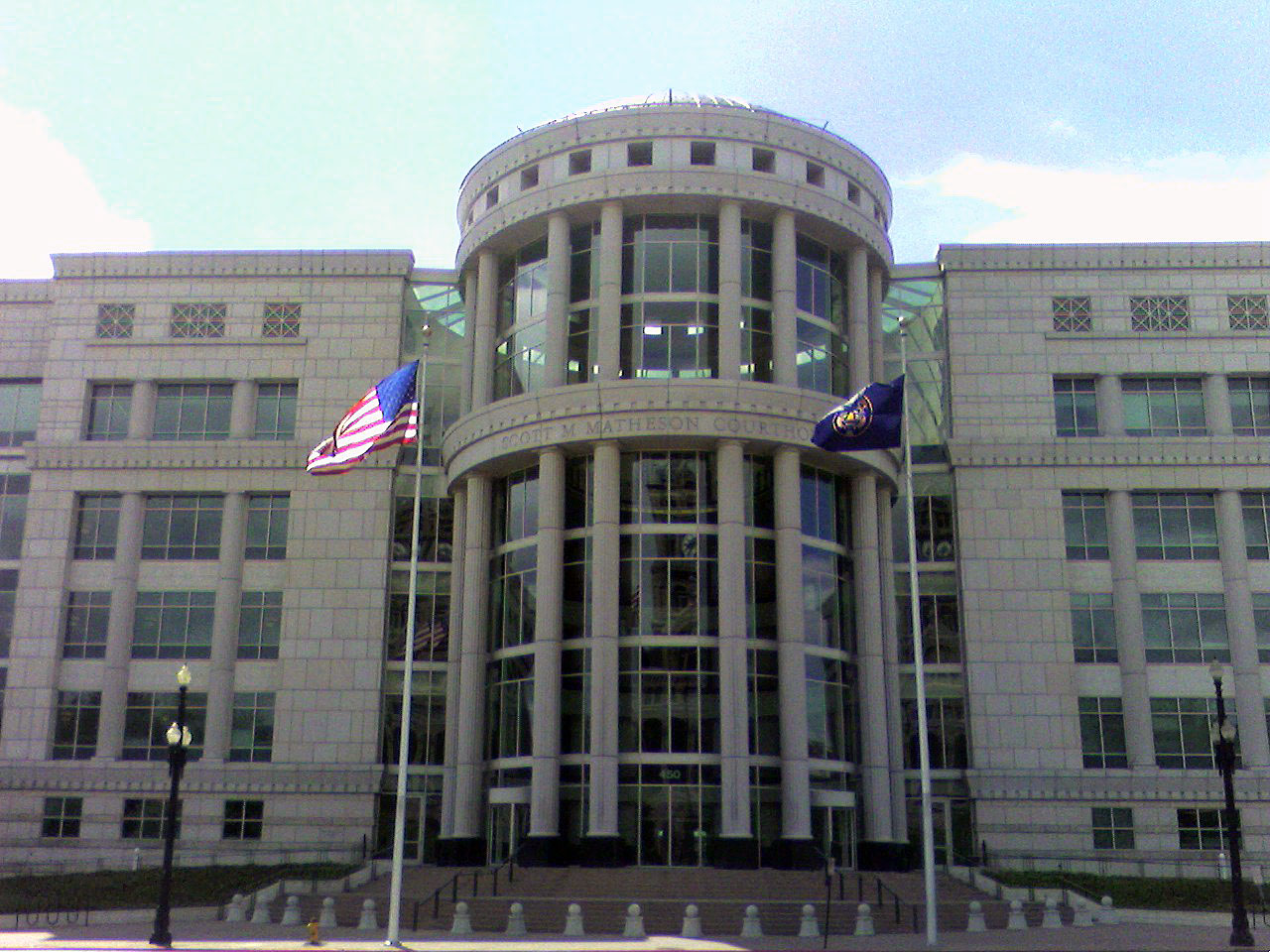
The Scott Matheson Courthouse is the seat of the Utah Supreme Court.

In the late 19th century, the federal government took issue with polygamy in the LDS Church. The LDS Church discontinued plural marriage in 1890, and in 1896 Utah gained admission to the Union. Many new people settled in the area soon after the Mormon pioneers. Relations have often been strained between the LDS population and the non-LDS population. These tensions have played a large part in Utah's history (Liberal Party vs. People's Party).

Utah votes predominantly Republican. Self-identified Latter-day Saints are more likely to vote for the Republican ticket than non-Mormons. Utah is one of the most Republican states in the nation. Utah was the single most Republican-leaning state in the country in every presidential election from 1976 to 2004, measured by the percentage point margin between the Republican and Democratic candidates. In 2008 Utah was only the third-most Republican state (after Wyoming and Oklahoma), but in 2012, with Mormon Mitt Romney atop the Republican ticket, Utah returned to its position as the most Republican state. However, the 2016 presidential election result saw Republican Donald Trump carry the state (marking the thirteenth consecutive win by the Republican presidential candidate) with only a plurality, the first time this happened since 1992.

Both of Utah's U.S. Senators, John Curtis and Mike Lee, are Republican, as are all four of its U.S. Representatives. Ben McAdams is the most recent Democrat to represent Utah in Congress, representing the 4th congressional district, based in Salt Lake City, from 2019 to 2021. He lost re-election to Burgess Owens, a Republican, in 2020. After Jon Huntsman Jr. resigned to serve as U.S. Ambassador to China in 2009, Gary Herbert was sworn in as governor on August 11, 2009. Herbert was elected to serve out the remainder of the term in a special election in 2010, defeating Democratic nominee Salt Lake County Mayor Peter Corroon with 64% of the vote. He won election to a full four-year term in 2012, defeating the Democrat Peter Cooke with 68% of the vote.

The LDS Church maintains an official policy of neutrality about political parties and candidates. In the 1970s, then-Apostle Ezra Taft Benson was quoted by the Associated Press that it would be difficult for a faithful Latter-day Saint to be a liberal Democrat. Although the LDS Church has officially repudiated such statements on many occasions, Democratic candidates—including LDS Democrats—believe Republicans capitalize on the perception that the Republican Party is doctrinally superior. Political scientist and pollster Dan Jones explains this disparity by noting that the national Democratic Party is associated with liberal positions on gay marriage and abortion, both of which the LDS Church is against. The Republican Party in heavily Mormon Utah County presents itself as the superior choice for Latter-day Saints. Even though Utah Democratic candidates are predominantly LDS, socially conservative, and pro-life, no Democrat has won in Utah County since 1994.

David Magleby, dean of Social and Behavioral Sciences at Brigham Young University, a lifelong Democrat and a political analyst, asserts that the Republican Party has more conservative positions than the LDS Church. Magleby argues that the locally conservative Democrats are in better accord with LDS doctrine. For example, the Republican Party of Utah opposes almost all abortions while Utah Democrats take a more liberal approach, although more conservative than their national counterparts. On Second Amendment issues, the state GOP has been at odds with the LDS Church's position opposing concealed firearms in places of worship and public spaces. In 1998, the church expressed concern that Utahns perceived the Republican Party as an LDS institution and authorized lifelong Democrat and Seventy Marlin Jensen to promote LDS bipartisanship.

Apart from liberal strongholds like Salt Lake City and Park City, Utah is much more conservative than the United States as a whole, primarily on social issues. Compared to other Republican-dominated states in the Mountain West such as Idaho and Wyoming, Utah politics have a more moralistic and less libertarian character, according to David Magleby. Nevertheless, organizations such as the Libertas Institute, a libertarian think tank based in Lehi, have influenced state policy in a more libertarian direction on issues such as medical cannabis legalization and occupational licensing. Since becoming a state in 1896, Utah has had only two non-Mormon governors.

In 2006, the legislature passed legislation aimed at banning joint custody for a non-biological parent of a child. The custody measure passed the legislature and was vetoed by the governor, a reciprocal benefits supporter. Carbon County's Democrats are generally made up of members of the large Greek, Italian, and Southeastern European communities, whose ancestors migrated in the early 20th century to work in the extensive mining industry. The views common amongst this group are heavily influenced by labor politics, particularly of the New Deal Era. The state's most Republican areas tend to be Utah County, which is the home to Brigham Young University (BYU) in the city of Provo, and nearly all the rural counties. These areas generally hold socially conservative views in line with that of the national Religious Right. The most Democratic areas of the state lie currently in and around Salt Lake City proper.

The state has not voted for a Democrat for president since 1964. Historically, Republican presidential nominees score one of their best margins of victory here. Utah was the Republicans' best state in the 1976, 1980, 1984, 1988, 1996, 2000, 2004, and 2012 elections. In 1992, Utah was the only state in the nation where Democratic candidate Bill Clinton finished behind both Republican candidate George HW Bush and Independent candidate Ross Perot. In 2004, Republican George W. Bush won every county in the state and Utah gave him his largest margin of victory of any state. He won the state's five electoral votes by a margin of 46 percentage points with 71.5% of the vote. In the 1996 Presidential elections the Republican candidate received a smaller 54% of the vote while the Democrat earned 34%. In 2020, the Associated Press wrote a piece profiling Utah's political culture during that year's presidential election. The article noted a more bipartisan and cooperative environment, along with conservative support of liberal causes such as LGBT rights and marijuana use, despite the Republican dominance in the state and the political polarization seen in other parts of the U.S. at the time.

== Major cities and towns ==
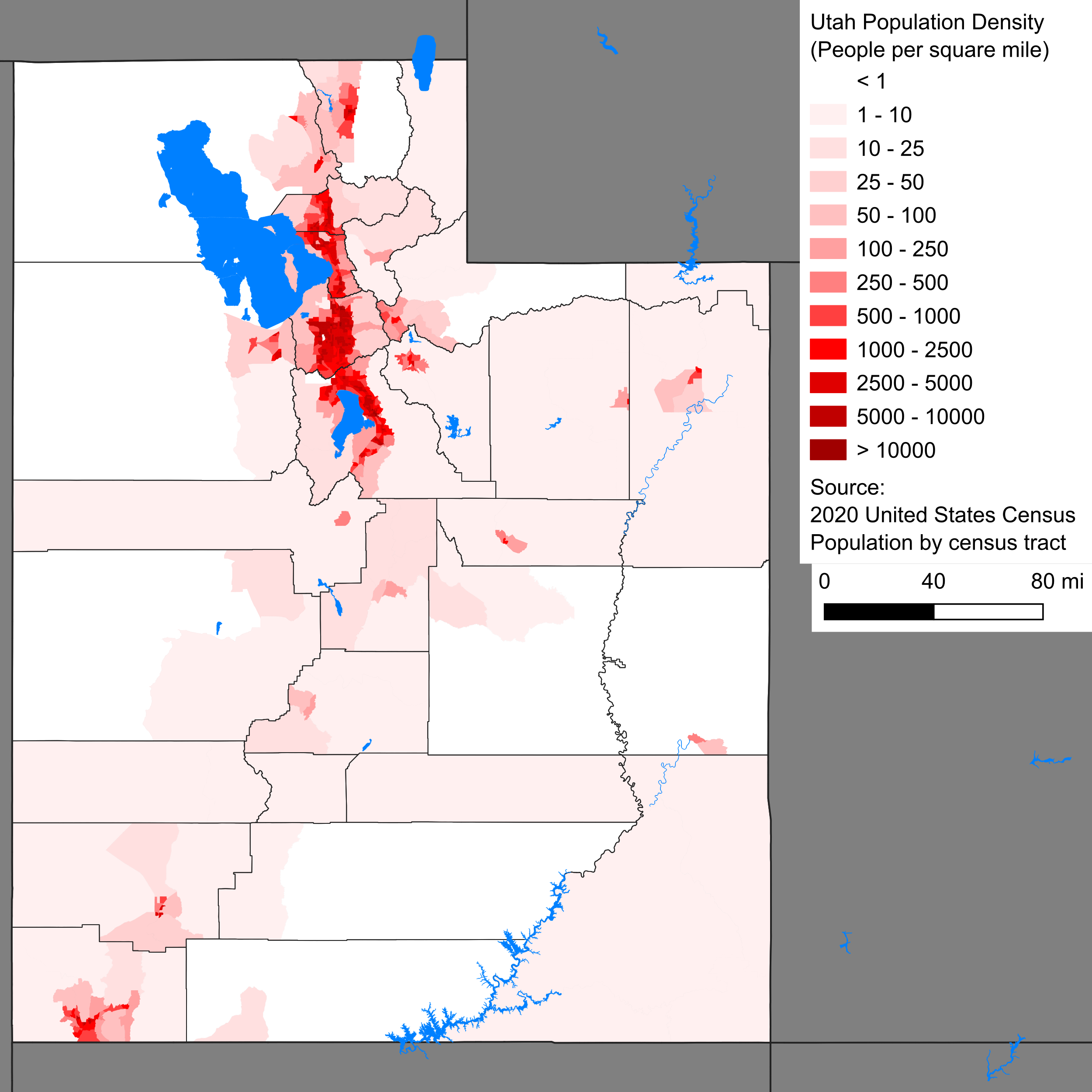
Utah population density map

Utah's population is concentrated in two areas, the Wasatch Front in the north-central part of the state, with over 2.6 million residents; and Washington County, in southwestern Utah, locally known as "Dixie", with more than 175,000 residents in the metropolitan area.

According to the 2010 census, Utah was the second fastest-growing state (at 23.8 percent) in the United States between 2000 and 2010 (behind Nevada). St. George, in the southwest, is the second fastest-growing metropolitan area in the United States, trailing Greeley, Colorado.

The three fastest-growing counties from 2000 to 2010 were Wasatch County (54.7%), Washington County (52.9%), and Tooele County (42.9%). However, Utah County added the most people (148,028). Between 2000 and 2010, Saratoga Springs (1,673%), Herriman (1,330%), Eagle Mountain (893%), Cedar Hills (217%), South Willard (168%), Nibley (166%), Syracuse (159%), West Haven (158%), Lehi (149%), Washington (129%), and Stansbury Park (116%) all at least doubled in population. West Jordan (35,376), Lehi (28,379), St. George (23,234), South Jordan (20,981), West Valley City (20,584), and Herriman (20,262) all added at least 20,000 people.

Utah Rank	City	Population (2020) within city limits	Land area	Population density (/mi^{2})	Population density (/km^{2})	County
1	Salt Lake City	199,723	109.1 sq mi (283 km^{2})	1,830.6	706	Salt Lake
2	West Valley City	140,230	35.4 sq mi (92 km^{2})	3,961.3	1,524	Salt Lake
3	West Jordan	116,961	30.9 sq mi (80 km^{2})	3,785.1	1,462	Salt Lake
4	Provo	115,162	39.6 sq mi (103 km^{2})	2,908.1	1,118	Utah County
5	Orem	98,129	18.4 sq mi (48 km^{2})	5,333.1	2,044	Utah County
6	Sandy	96,904	22.3 sq mi (58 km^{2})	4,345.5	1,671	Salt Lake
7	St. George	95,342	64.4 sq mi (167 km^{2})	1,480.5	571	Washington
8	Ogden	87,321	26.6 sq mi (69 km^{2})	3,282.7	1,266	Weber
9	Layton	81,773	22.0 sq mi (57 km^{2})	3,717	1,434	Davis
10	South Jordan	77,487	22.05 sq mi (57 km^{2})	3,514.1	1,359	Salt Lake
11	Lehi	75,907	26.3 sq mi (68 km^{2})	2,886.2	1,116	Utah
12	Millcreek	63,380	13.7 sq mi (35 km^{2})	4,626.3	1,811	Salt Lake
13	Taylorsville	60,448	10.7 sq mi (28 km^{2})	5,649.3	2,159	Salt Lake

Combined statistical area	Population (2010)
Salt Lake City-Ogden-Clearfield comprises: Salt Lake City and Ogden-Clearfield Metropolitan Areas and Brigham City and Heber Micropolitan Areas (as listed below)	1,744,886

Utah Rank	Metropolitan area	Population (2017)	Counties
1	Salt Lake City*	1,203,105	Salt Lake, Tooele, Summit
2	Ogden-Clearfield*	665,358	Weber, Davis, Morgan
3	Provo-Orem	617,675	Utah
4	St. George	165,662	Washington
5	Logan	138,002	Cache, Franklin (Idaho)

- Until 2003, the Salt Lake City and Ogden-Clearfield metropolitan areas were considered as a single metropolitan area.

Utah Rank	Micropolitan area	Population (2010)
1	Brigham City	49,015
2	Cedar City	44,540
3	Vernal	29,885
4	Heber	21,066
5	Price	19,549
6	Richfield	18,382

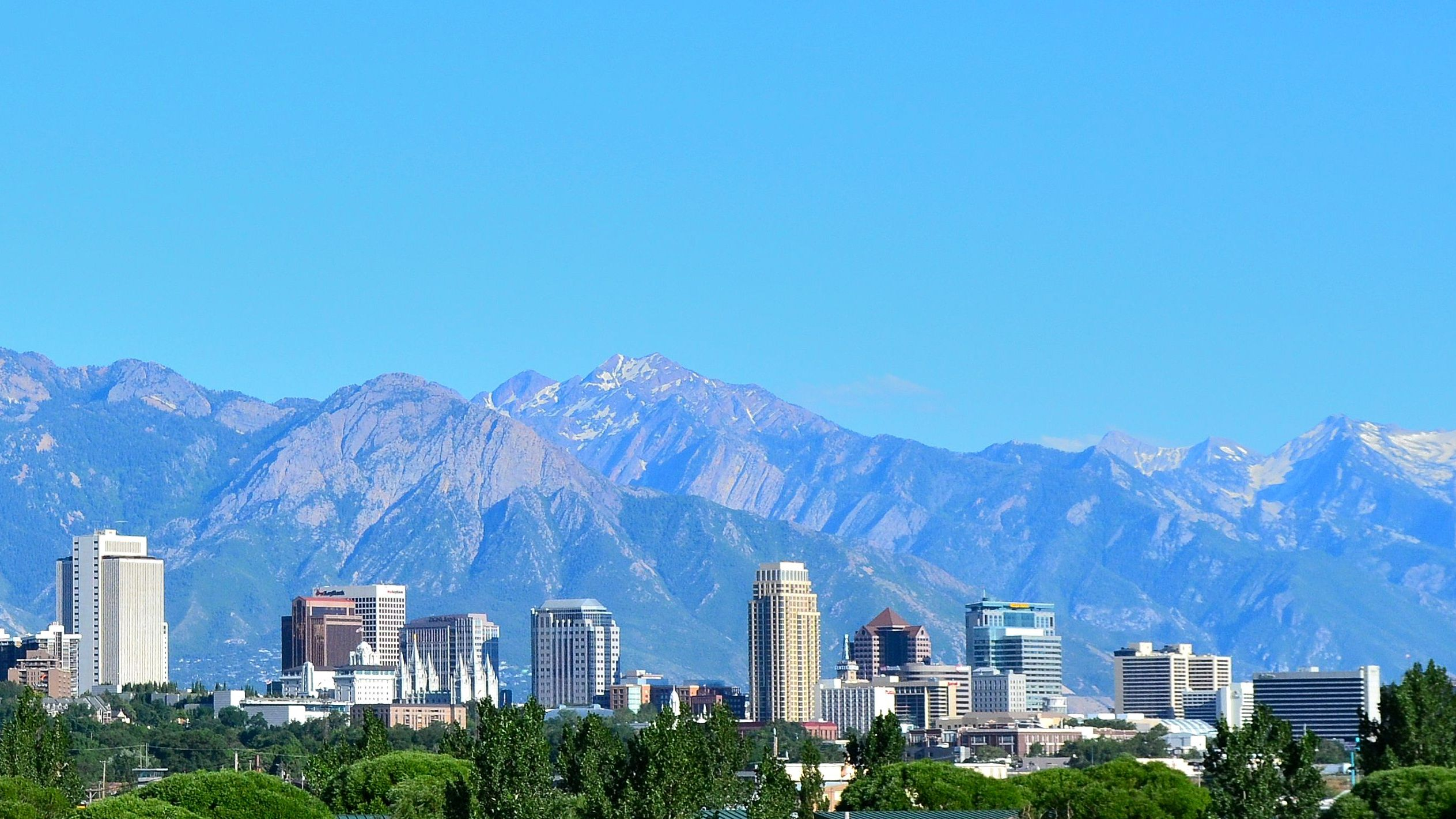
Salt Lake City

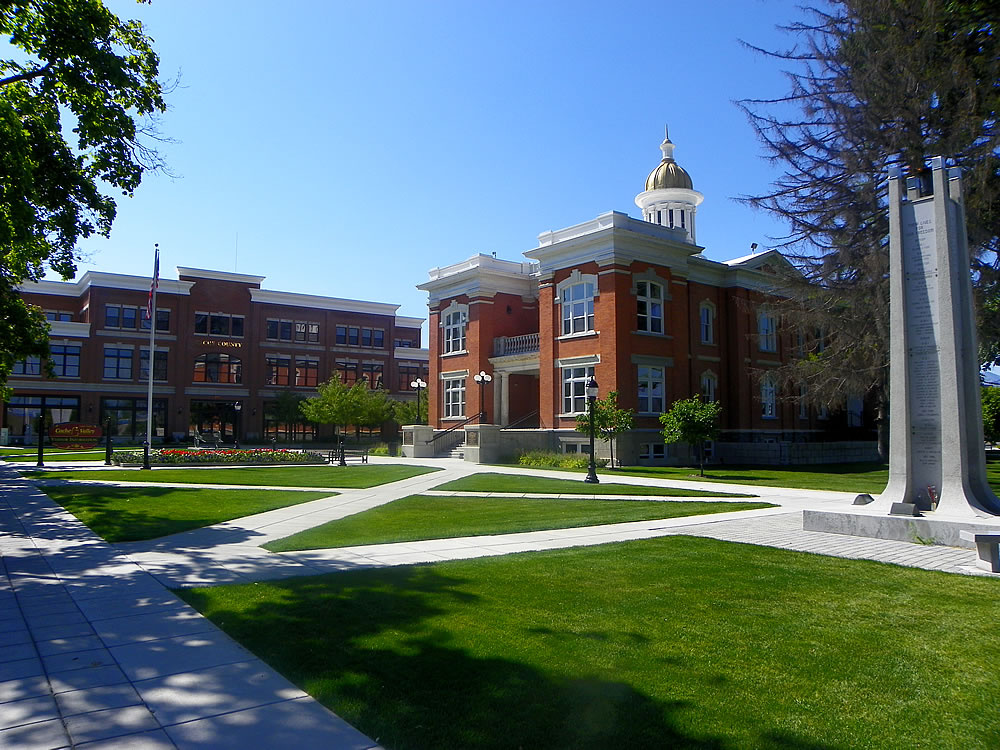
Logan

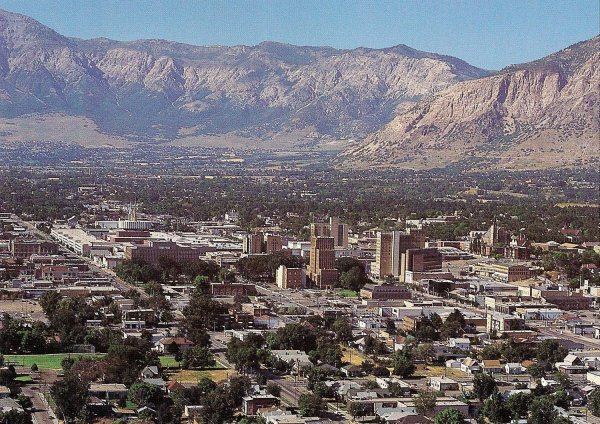
Ogden

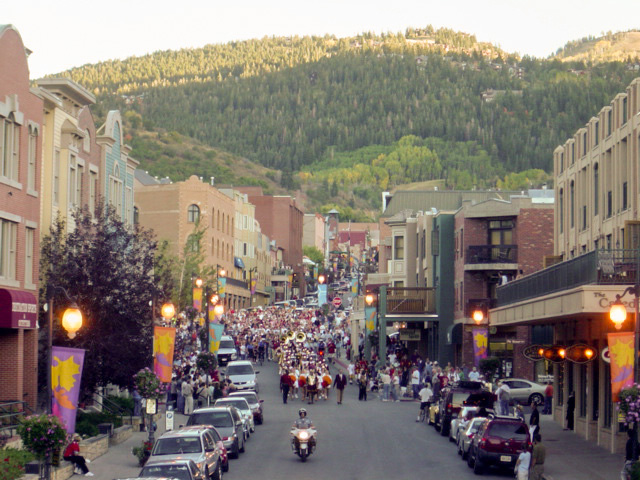
Park City

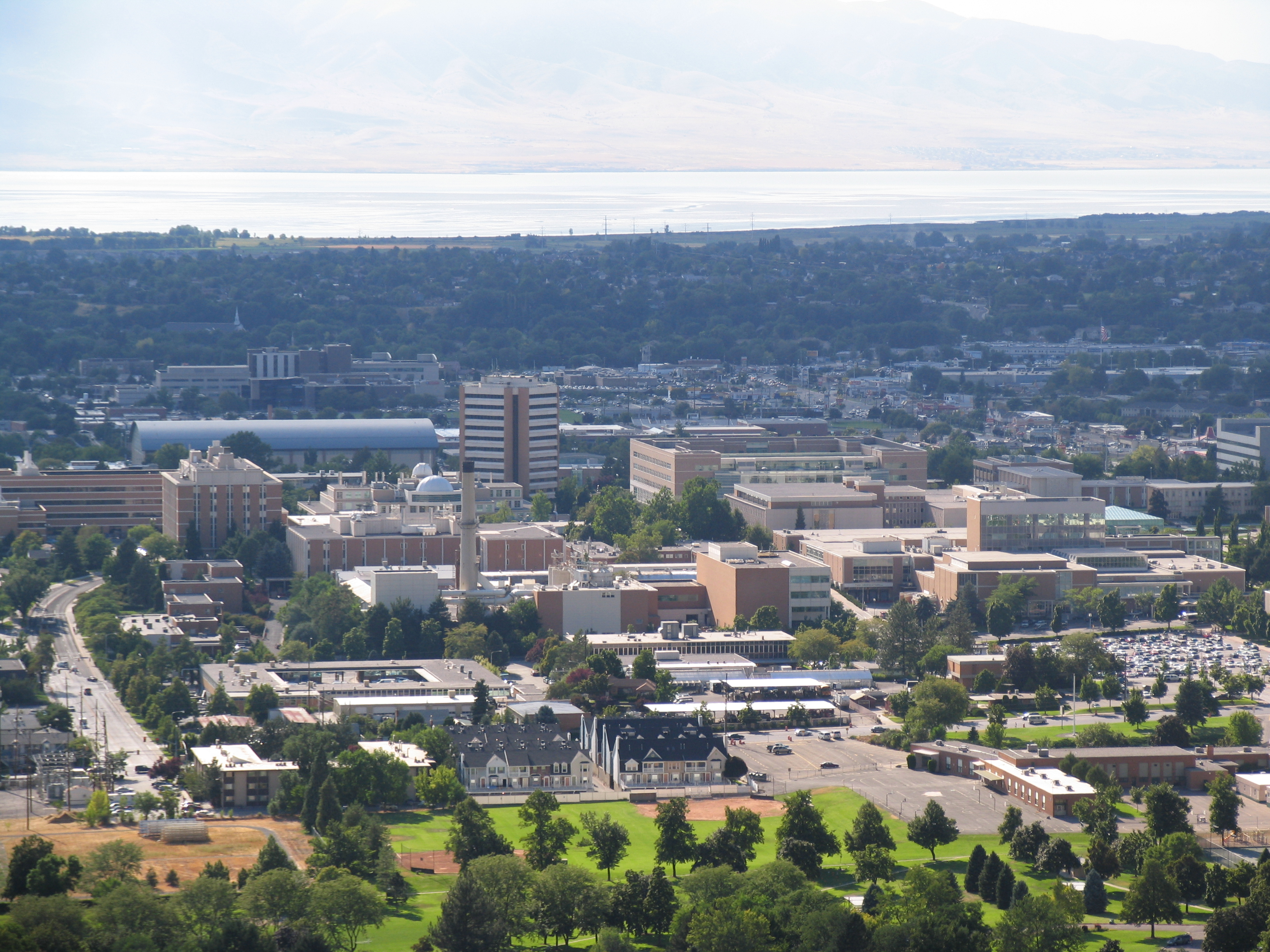
Provo

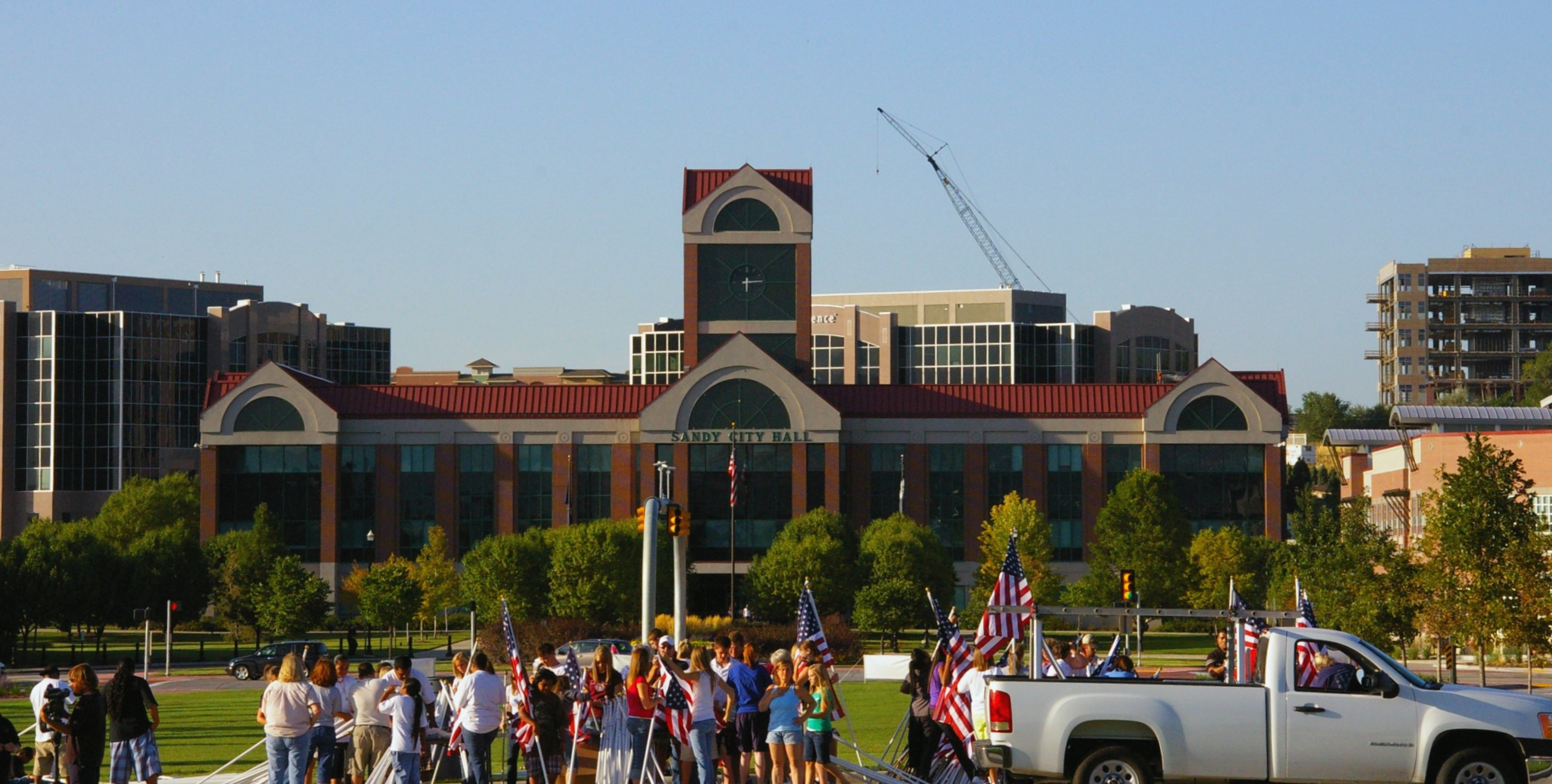
Sandy

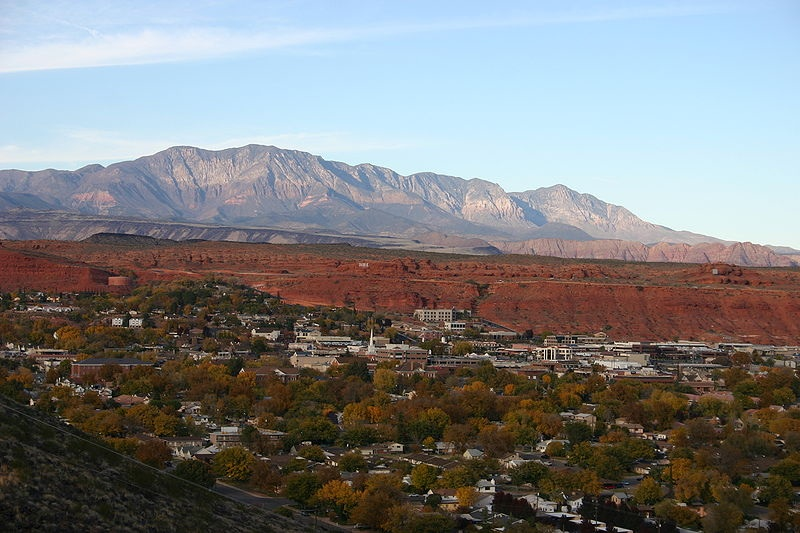
St. George

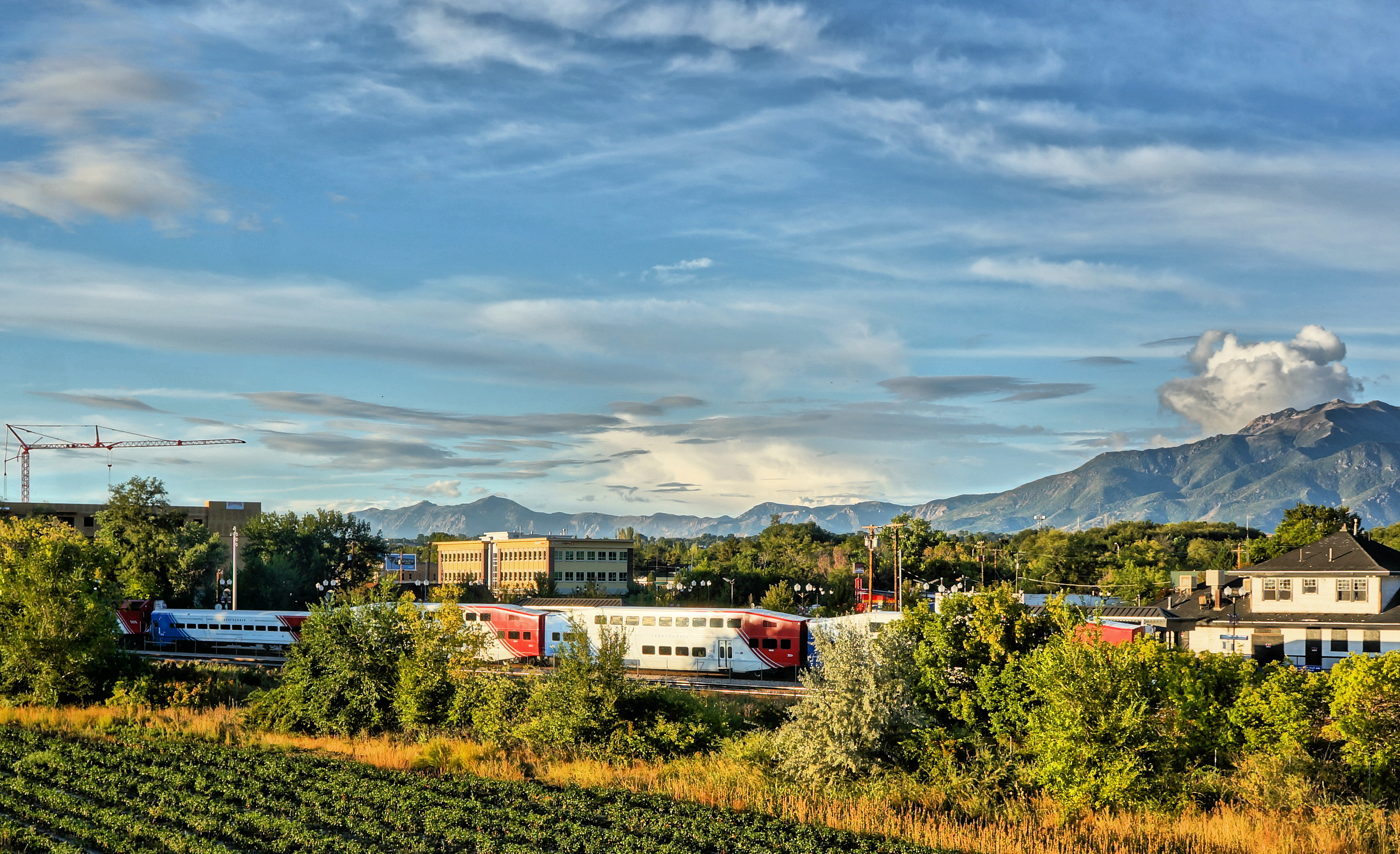
Layton

== Colleges and universities ==
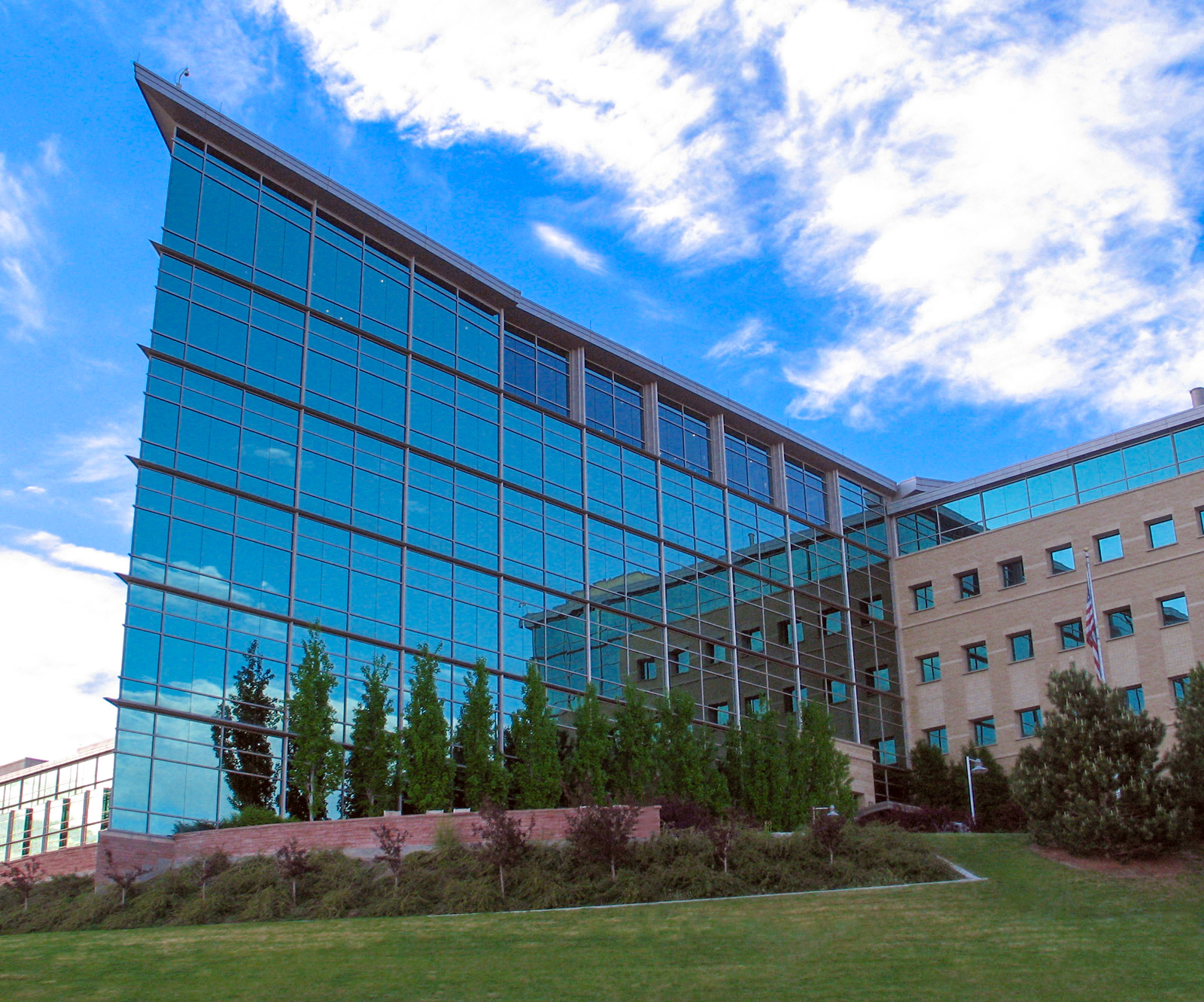
The Huntsman Cancer Institute on the campus of the University of Utah (U of U) in Salt Lake City

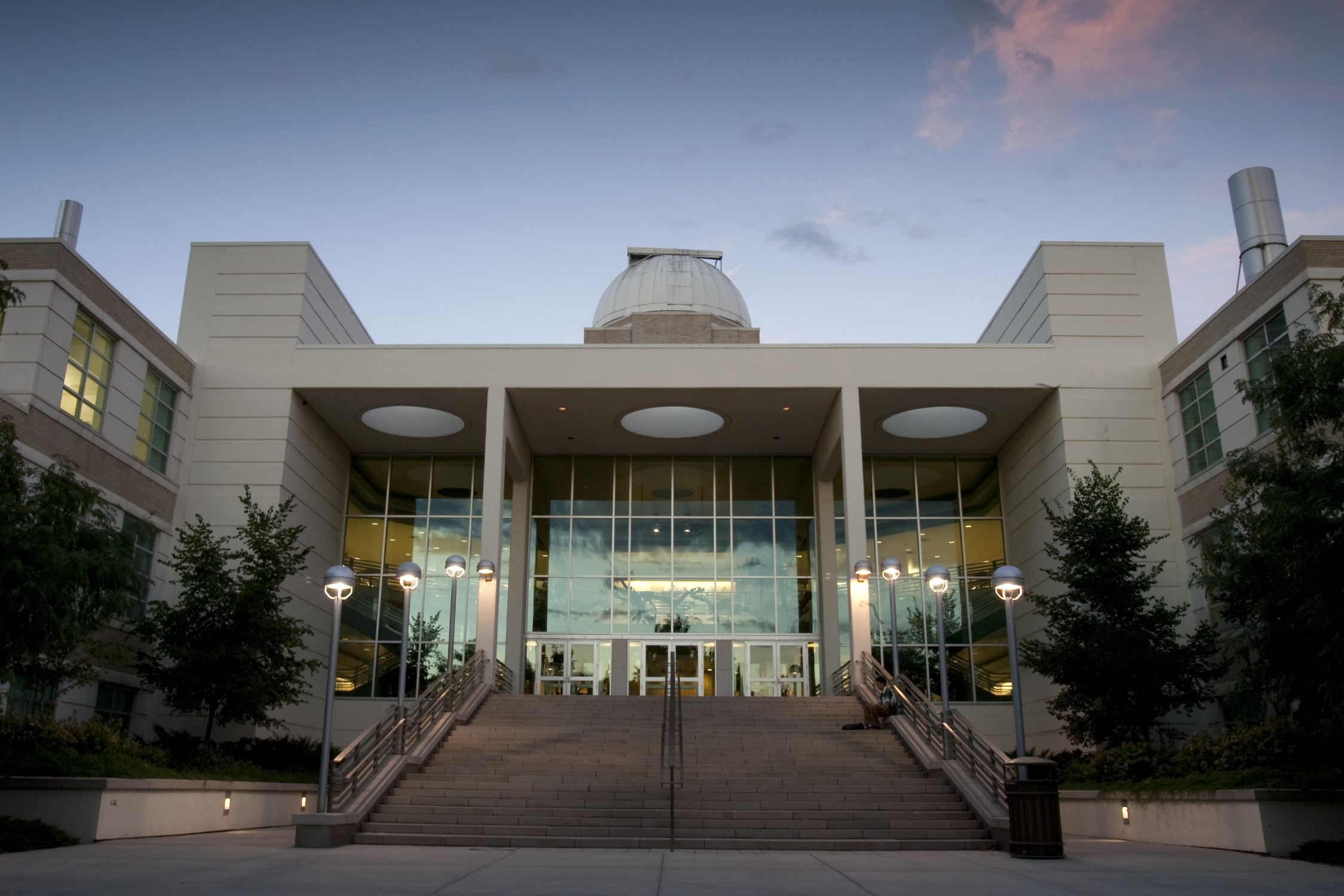
The Eyring Science Center on the campus of Brigham Young University (BYU) in Provo, Utah

- Bridgerland Technical College in Logan
- Broadview College in West Jordan
- Brigham Young University in Provo (satellite campus in Salt Lake City)
- Davis Technical College in Kaysville
- Eagle Gate College in Murray and Layton
- Ensign College (formerly LDS Business College) in Salt Lake City
- Joyce University of Nursing and Health Sciences (formerly Ameritech College of Healthcare) in Draper
- Mountainland Technical College in Lehi
- Neumont College of Computer Science in South Jordan
- Noorda College of Osteopathic Medicine in Provo
- Ogden–Weber Technical College in Ogden
- Provo College in Provo
- Rocky Mountain University of Health Professions in Provo
- Roseman University in South Jordan, Utah
- Salt Lake Community College in Taylorsville
- Snow College in Ephraim and Richfield
- Southern Utah University in Cedar City
- Southwest Technical College in Cedar City
- Tooele Technical College in Tooele
- Uintah Basin Technical College in Roosevelt
- University of Phoenix at various locations statewide
- University of Utah in Salt Lake City
- Utah State University in Logan (satellite campuses at various state locations)
- Utah State University Eastern in Price
- Utah Tech University in St. George (formerly Dixie State University) as of May 2022, and legal effect in July 2022.)
- Utah Valley University in Orem
- Weber State University in Ogden
- Western Governors University an online only university, headquartered in Salt Lake City
- Westminster College in Salt Lake City

== Culture ==
=== Sports ===
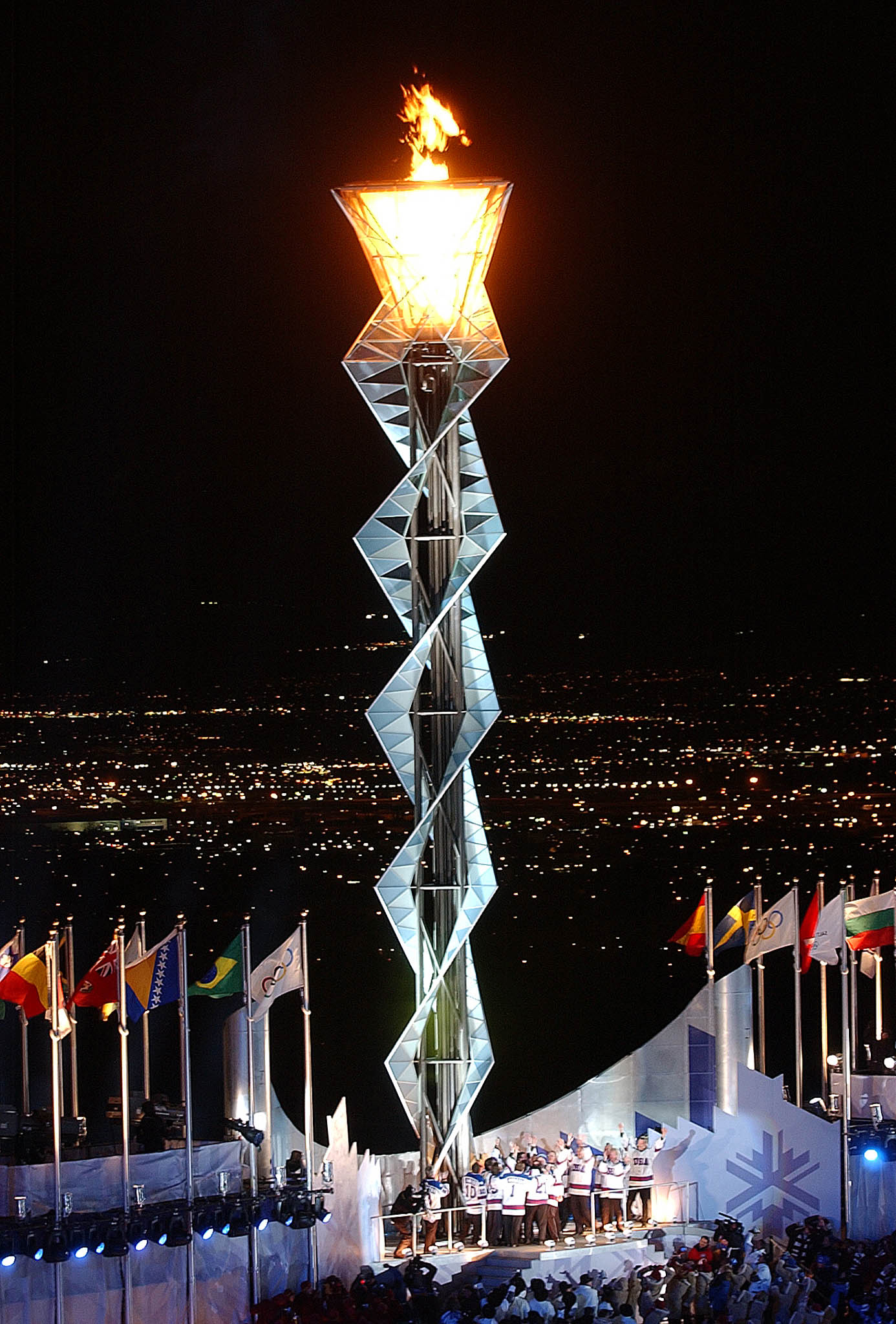
The Olympic cauldron is lit by the 'Miracle on Ice' 1980 U.S. men's ice hockey team at the opening ceremony of the 2002 Winter Olympics in Salt Lake City

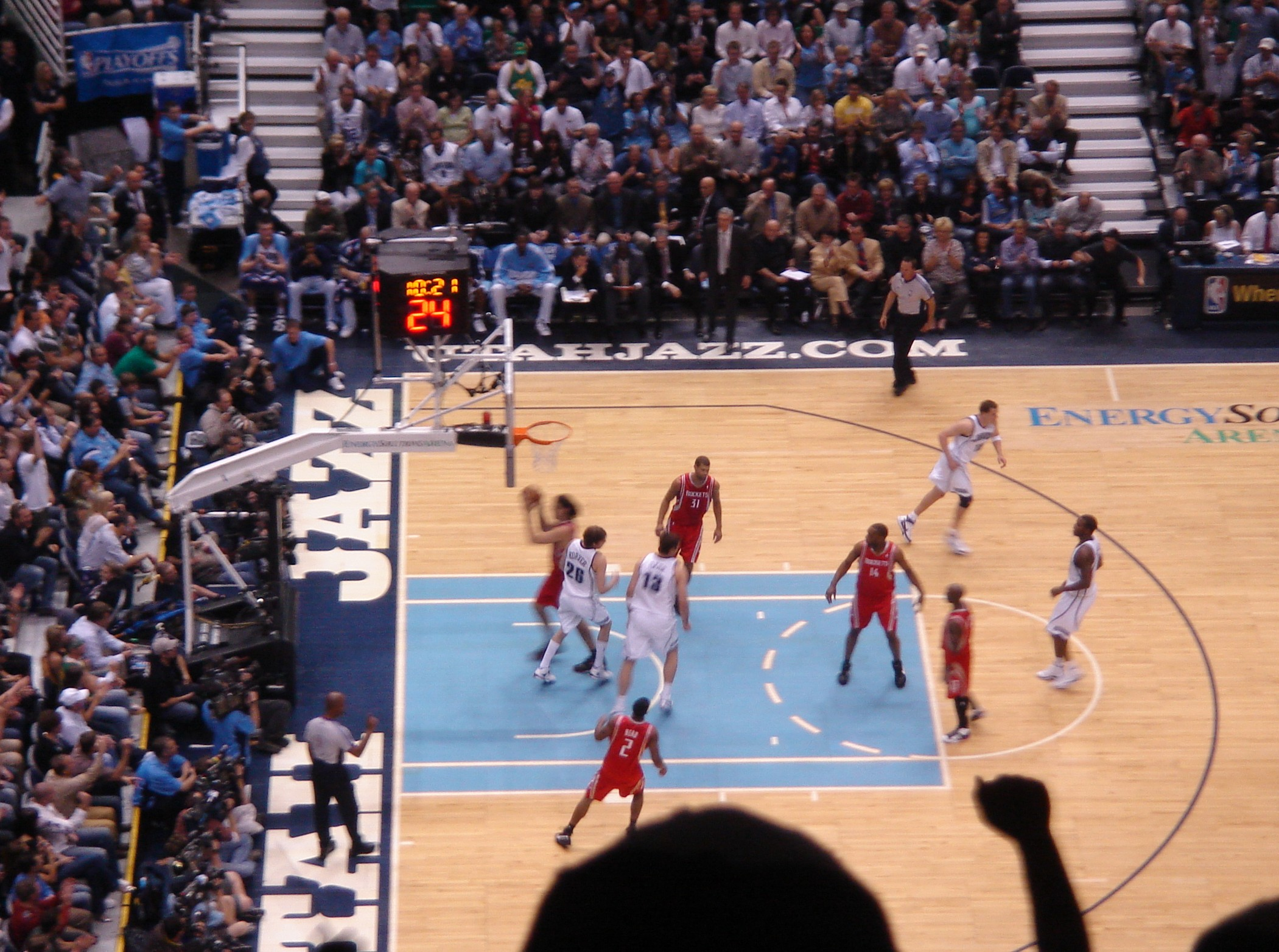
The Utah Jazz playing against the Houston Rockets

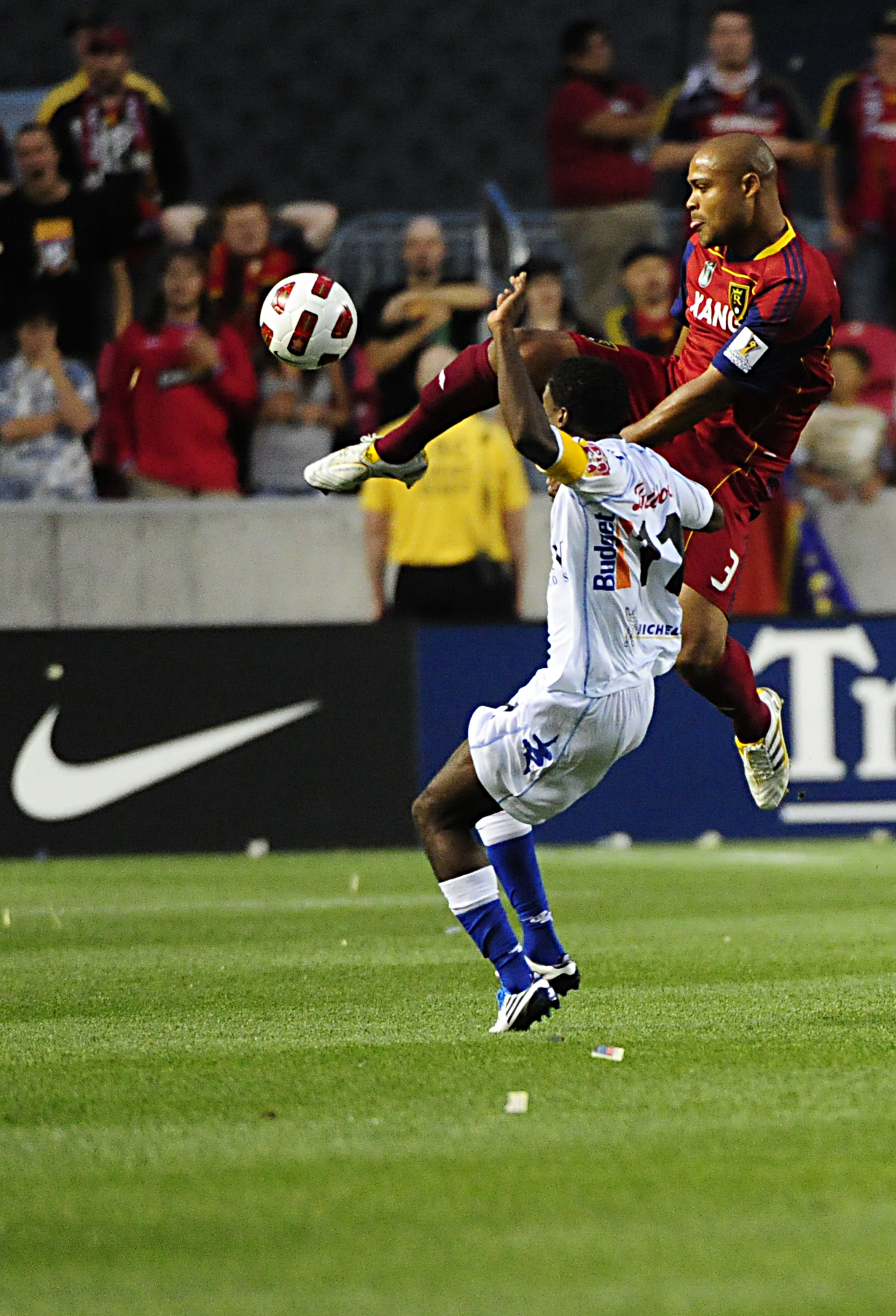
Robbie Russell playing for Real Salt Lake

Utah is the second-least populous U.S. state to have a major professional sports league franchise after the Vegas Golden Knights joined the National Hockey League in 2017. The Utah Jazz of the National Basketball Association play at the Delta Center in Salt Lake City. The team moved to the city from New Orleans in 1979 and has been one of the most consistently successful teams in the league (although they have yet to win a championship). The Salt Lake City Stars are the G League affiliate of the Jazz. The team moved from Idaho to Utah in 2016. Salt Lake City was previously host to the Utah Stars, who competed in the ABA from 1970 to 1976 and won one championship, and to the Utah Starzz of the WNBA from 1997 to 2003.

In 2024, the Utah Mammoth was established, beginning play during the 2024–25 National Hockey League season. The team was established using the existing roster, staff and draft picks of the Arizona Coyotes, which were purchased by businessman and Jazz owner Ryan Smith. The Utah Mammoth plays their home games at the Delta Center, sharing the facility with the Jazz. Utah previously had one minor league hockey team, the Utah Grizzlies, who played at the Maverik Center and competed in the ECHL. Following the death of team owner David Elmore, the team was sold and relocated to New Jersey after the 2026 season.

Real Salt Lake of Major League Soccer was founded in 2005 and plays their home matches at America First Field in Sandy. RSL remains the only Utah major league sports team to have won a national championship, having won the MLS Cup in 2009. RSL currently operates two adult teams in addition to the MLS side. Real Monarchs, competing in the third-tier MLS Next Pro, is the official reserve side for RSL. The team began to play in the 2015 season at Rio Tinto Stadium, remaining there until moving to Zions Bank Stadium, located at RSL's training center in Herriman, for the 2018 season and beyond. The Utah Royals returned to the National Women's Soccer League (NWSL), the top level of U.S. women's soccer, in 2024. The original team of that name, which shared ownership with RSL and also played at America First Field, started NWSL play in 2018. Due to fallout from controversies surrounding RSL's ownership, leading to the club's eventual sale, RSL shuttered the Royals after the 2020 season, selling its player-related assets to a new Kansas City franchise. Before the creation of the Royals, RSL's main women's side had been Real Salt Lake Women, which began play in the Women's Premier Soccer League in 2008 and moved to United Women's Soccer in 2016, before folding in 2019.

Utah's highest level Minor League Baseball team is the Triple-A Salt Lake Bees, as a part of the Pacific Coast League. The team previously played at Smith's Ballpark in Salt Lake City, but moved to The Ballpark at America First Square in Daybreak in 2025. Utah has one professional softball team, the Utah Talons of the Athletes Unlimited Softball League, who began play at Dumke Family Stadium in 2026.

Utah has seven universities that compete in Division I of the NCAA. Three of the schools have football programs that participate in the top-level Football Bowl Subdivision: BYU and Utah in the Big 12 Conference (with Utah moving from the Pac-12 Conference in 2024), and Utah State in the Mountain West Conference. In addition, Weber State and Southern Utah (SUU) compete in the Big Sky Conference of the FCS. Utah Tech, with an FCS football program, and Utah Valley, with no football program, are members of the Western Athletic Conference (WAC). Utah Tech football plays in the United Athletic Conference, a football-only partnership between the WAC and the Atlantic Sun Conference (ASUN). Most of these schools house select teams outside of their primary conferences; for example, BYU men's volleyball plays in the Mountain Pacific Sports Federation and Utah plays men's lacrosse in the ASUN.

Salt Lake City hosted the 2002 Winter Olympics. After early financial struggles and scandals, the 2002 Olympics eventually became among the most successful Winter Olympics in history from a marketing and financial standpoint. Watched by more than two billion viewers, the Games ended up with a profit of $100 million.

Utah has hosted professional golf tournaments such as the Uniting Fore Care Classic, and currently hosts the Utah Championship.

Rugby union has been growing quickly in the state of Utah, growing from 17 teams in 2009 to 70 as of 2013 with more than 3,000 players, and more than 55 high school varsity teams. The growth has been inspired in part by the 2008 movie Forever Strong. Utah fields two of the most competitive teams in the nation in college rugby—BYU and Utah. BYU has won the National Championship in 2009, 2012, 2013, 2014, and 2015. Formed in 2017, the Utah Warriors were a Major League Rugby (Union) team based in Salt Lake City which ceased operations at the conclusion of the 2025 Major League Rugby season.

Rugby league is also played in Utah, through the Utah Rugby League Association which runs a 4-team competition with teams based in Provo, Bluffdale, Riverton and Lehi.

=== Entertainment ===
Utah is the setting of or the filming location for many books, films, television series, music videos, and video games. Southern Utah is the site of many westerns, including Butch Cassidy and the Sundance Kid and Gunsmoke, along with modern movies like Thelma and Louise and Forrest Gump. The Bonneville Salt Flats are also a popular location, seen in films such as Independence Day and Pirates of the Caribbean: At World's End. Utah's capital Salt Lake City is the final location in the video game The Last of Us.

The Sundance Film Festival was founded in 1978, and takes place every January in Park City. It is considered one of the "big five" film festivals, and is the largest independent film festival in the United States. It will have its final festival in Utah in 2026 and move to Boulder, Colorado starting in 2027.

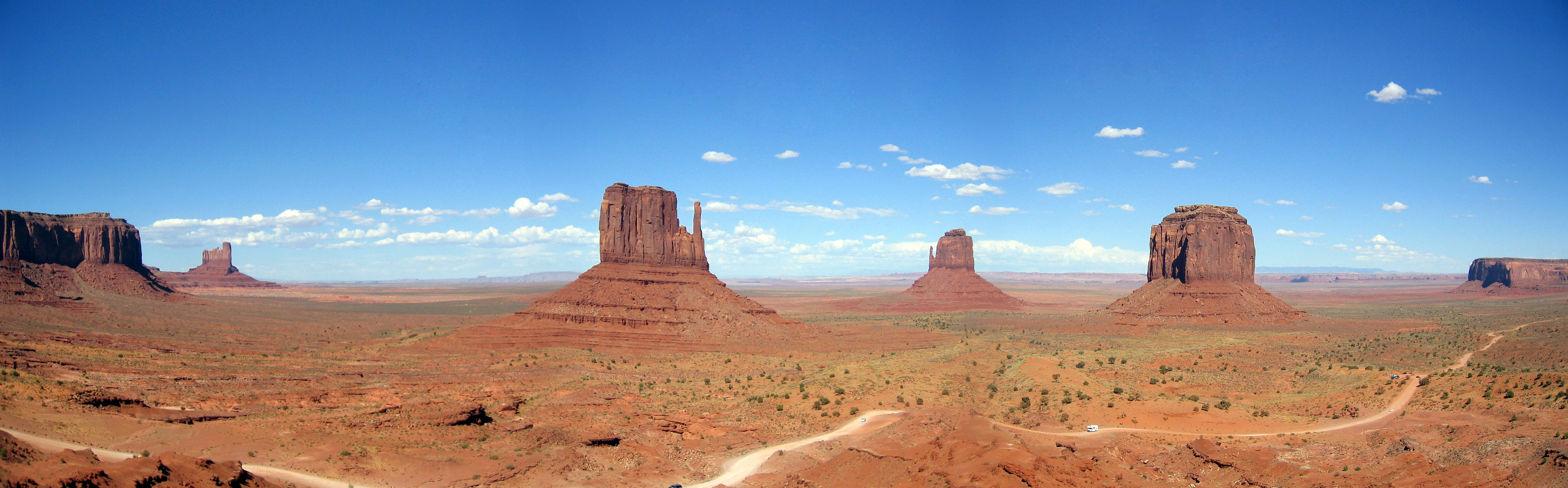
Monument Valley in southeastern Utah. This area was used to film many Hollywood Westerns.

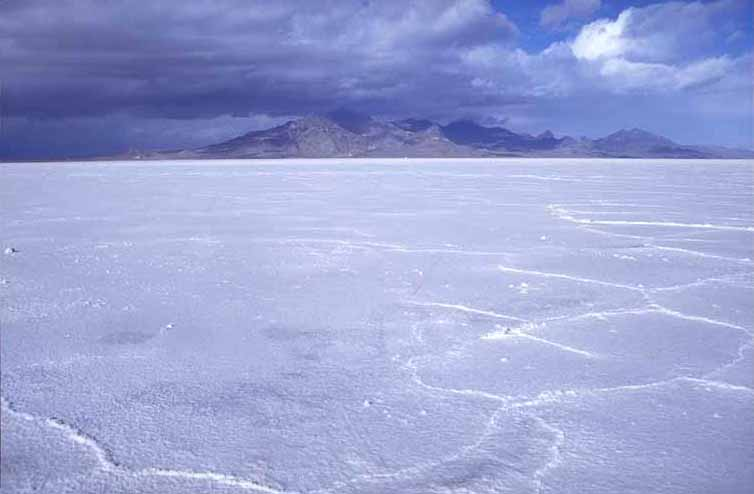
The otherworldly look of the Bonneville Salt Flats has been used in many movies and commercials.

== See also ==
- Index of Utah-related articles
- Outline of Utah

== Notes ==
Preceded by Wyoming	List of U.S. states by date of statehood Admitted on January 4, 1896 (45th)	Succeeded by Oklahoma
