= Brian Head =

Brian Head may refer to:

== Places ==
- Brian Head, Utah, a town
- Brian Head (mountain), a mountain in Utah, United States
- Brian Head Ski Resort

== People ==
- Brian Head (composer) (born 1964), American composer, guitarist, and lecturer
- Brian Head (sociologist), Australian sociologist who defined the concept of cultural cringe
- Brian Head (Manitoba politician)
