= Markagunt Plateau =

Plateau in Iron and Kane counties in Utah, United States

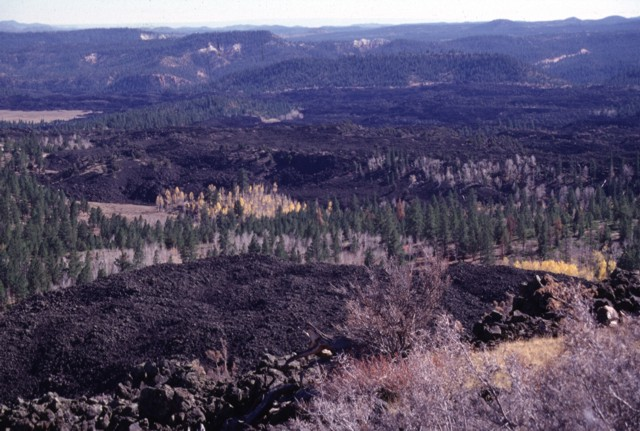

Highest point
- Peak: Brian Head
- Elevation: 11,312 ft (3,448 m)
- Coordinates: 37.58°N 112.67°W

Naming
- English translation: "Highland of trees"
- Language of name: Piute

Geography
- Location within Utah

Geology
- Last eruption: 1050 or before

Markagunt Plateau is a volcanic field in southern Utah, United States. Formed in a region of older volcanics, it consists of several cinder cones and associated lava flows. Some of the lava flows feature lava tubes such as Mammoth Cave, while others have formed lava dams and lakes like Navajo Lake. Volcanism took place during the Pliocene and latest Pleistocene but may have continued into the Holocene; legends of the Southern Paiute may reflect past eruptions.

== Geography and geomorphology ==
The Markagunt Plateau is in southern Utah in the counties Iron County, Garfield County and Kane County. Cedar City lies west and Kanab south of the volcanic field, which is crossed by Utah State Route 14, Utah State Route 143 and Utah State Route 148. Towns in the area include Duck Creek Village and Mammoth Creek.

The volcanic field is on a plateau bordered to the south by the Pink Cliffs and to the west by the cliffs of Cedar Breaks National Monument, and features lava flows and over 25 cinder cones mostly between Panguitch Lake and Navajo Lake although older volcanics occur south of Panguitch. Some cones such as Hancock Peak, Henrie Knolls and Strawberry Knolls are up to 150 metres (500 ft) high, and Miller Knoll cone is surrounded by three satellite vents. Past glaciation has eroded some vents. Some recent vents formed along lineaments and faults; this includes the chain of over 19 cinder cones that generated the Henrie Knolls flows.

Lava flows in the Markagunt Plateau are blocky and have flow fronts which reach heights of 30–60 metres (98–197 ft); many were erupted from fissure vents. Some of the lava flows of Markagunt Plateau are among the youngest in Utah; these are sparsely vegetated and blocky, while others are cut by streams and stream terraces. Bowers Cave and Mammoth Cave are lava tubes set in lava flows on the Markagunt Plateau, the 3.7 kilometres (12,000 ft) long Duck Creek Lava Tube is among the longest and highest lava tubes in the United States. Perennial ice and pools of water are widespread in the tubes, which are typically accessible through collapsed portions of the tubes. Lava flows almost reach Panguitch Lake.

Lava flows have blocked surface drainages, forming Navajo Lake which drains underground into two watersheds and was later further dammed by humans; another lava-dammed lake downstream from Navajo Lake is now a meadow and Blue Spring Valley also saw the development of lava dams. As a consequence, water on the Markagunt Plateau flows underground through sinkholes developed in limestone rocks, and the burial of surface drainages by highly permeable lava flows likely aided in their development; some sinkholes have formed in basalt and other karstic features are also found in the volcanic field. Many streams and ephemeral creeks head in springs or disappear into sinkholes.

== Geology ==
Geologically, southwestern Utah is at the margin between the geologic provinces known as the Colorado Plateau and the Basin and Range Province, the former of which features flat lying sediments while the latter is characterized by steep horsts and grabens. After the Oligocene and Miocene, during which volcanism was characterized by calderas and stratovolcanoes, beginning 8 million years ago smaller volumes of mostly mafic magma formed lava domes, shield volcanoes, volcanic cones and volcanic plugs.

The Markagunt Plateau is part of the High Plateaus geologic province, in the Colorado Plateau and at its margins with the Basin and Range Province. It is a 60–80 kilometres (37–50 mi) wide fault-bounded block and the basement underneath the volcanoes is formed by various Cretaceous to Miocene sedimentary or volcanic rocks. Volcanism in the region has been ongoing for the last 5 million years. The volcanism is considered to be intraplate and unrelated to either mantle plumes or subduction. Together with other Quaternary volcanic fields in Utah it is sometimes considered part of a wider South Utah volcanic field.

=== Composition ===
Volcanic rocks erupted on the Markagunt Plateau range from alkali basalt over basalt and basaltic andesite to andesite and latite, and define calc-alkaline and tholeiitic suites which appear to become more silicic over time. Phenocrysts include clinopyroxene, olivine and plagioclase, with not all minerals present in all flows.

Volcanic rocks at Markagunt Plateau are unusual for the common occurrence of subalkaline volcanics; most other recent volcanic centres in the Basin and Range Province have produced alkali basalts. Mixing between crustal melts and primitive magmas may explain this tendency, while the presence of tholeiite may indicate the occurrence of rifting processes in western Utah.

== Climate and vegetation ==
Annual precipitation is about 760 millimetres (30 in) per year and mostly occurs in the form of snow from the Pacific Ocean, although summer monsoon precipitation also occurs. Most of the plateau is part of Dixie National Forest; trees include aspen, spruce and fir with an understory consisting of juniper, Mertensia arizonica and mountain gooseberry and the vegetation covers most surfaces except for the younger volcanoes and canyon walls. Additionally, in marshes vegetation includes hydrophilic plants such as cattails, while juniper grows on lava flows.

Midway Valley is a SNOTEL weather station located near the Utah State Route 14 junction with Utah State Route 148, just south of Blowhard Mountain. Midway Valley sits at an elevation of 9,800 feet or 2,987 meters and has a subalpine climate (Köppen Dsc).

Climate data for Midway Valley, Utah (elevation 9,800 feet or 2,987 meters), 2004–2020 normals:
Month	Jan	Feb	Mar	Apr	May	Jun	Jul	Aug	Sep	Oct	Nov	Dec	Year
Record high °F (°C)	54 (12)	59 (15)	60 (16)	66 (19)	71 (22)	79 (26)	79 (26)	79 (26)	77 (25)	67 (19)	62 (17)	53 (12)	79 (26)
Mean maximum °F (°C)	48.5 (9.2)	49.5 (9.7)	53.7 (12.1)	59.2 (15.1)	64.8 (18.2)	73.1 (22.8)	75.4 (24.1)	72.7 (22.6)	69.0 (20.6)	61.2 (16.2)	54.7 (12.6)	49.1 (9.5)	76.0 (24.4)
Mean daily maximum °F (°C)	35.1 (1.7)	34.9 (1.6)	41.2 (5.1)	45.5 (7.5)	52.9 (11.6)	63.8 (17.7)	68.4 (20.2)	66.1 (18.9)	59.9 (15.5)	49.5 (9.7)	41.4 (5.2)	33.8 (1.0)	49.4 (9.6)
Daily mean °F (°C)	25.2 (−3.8)	24.8 (−4.0)	30.3 (−0.9)	34.9 (1.6)	42.2 (5.7)	52.1 (11.2)	57.2 (14.0)	55.1 (12.8)	48.9 (9.4)	39.5 (4.2)	31.7 (−0.2)	24.3 (−4.3)	38.9 (3.8)
Mean daily minimum °F (°C)	15.2 (−9.3)	14.7 (−9.6)	19.4 (−7.0)	24.4 (−4.2)	31.4 (−0.3)	40.4 (4.7)	46.1 (7.8)	44.2 (6.8)	37.8 (3.2)	29.4 (−1.4)	21.9 (−5.6)	14.9 (−9.5)	28.3 (−2.0)
Mean minimum °F (°C)	−3.6 (−19.8)	−4.1 (−20.1)	3.4 (−15.9)	11.1 (−11.6)	19.6 (−6.9)	29.7 (−1.3)	38.6 (3.7)	37.6 (3.1)	25.9 (−3.4)	14.2 (−9.9)	3.8 (−15.7)	−4.1 (−20.1)	−9.2 (−22.9)
Record low °F (°C)	−18 (−28)	−15 (−26)	−5 (−21)	6 (−14)	11 (−12)	23 (−5)	33 (1)	32 (0)	19 (−7)	1 (−17)	−6 (−21)	−21 (−29)	−21 (−29)
Average precipitation inches (mm)	4.30 (109)	4.72 (120)	4.39 (112)	2.87 (73)	1.95 (50)	0.81 (21)	1.56 (40)	2.07 (53)	2.00 (51)	2.76 (70)	2.87 (73)	3.68 (93)	33.98 (865)
Source 1: XMACIS2
Source 2: NOAA (Precipitation)

There is another SNOTEL weather station north of Midway Valley along the Brian Head-Panguitch Lake Scenic Byway, roughly halfway between Panguitch Lake and Brian Head.

Climate data for Castle Valley, Utah (elevation 9,580 feet or 2,920 meters), 2004–2020 normals:
Month	Jan	Feb	Mar	Apr	May	Jun	Jul	Aug	Sep	Oct	Nov	Dec	Year
Record high °F (°C)	57 (14)	61 (16)	64 (18)	67 (19)	74 (23)	82 (28)	81 (27)	82 (28)	80 (27)	72 (22)	65 (18)	58 (14)	82 (28)
Mean maximum °F (°C)	51.2 (10.7)	52.8 (11.6)	58.1 (14.5)	61.2 (16.2)	66.2 (19.0)	75.2 (24.0)	78.1 (25.6)	75.4 (24.1)	72.3 (22.4)	65.1 (18.4)	58.8 (14.9)	51.3 (10.7)	78.6 (25.9)
Mean daily maximum °F (°C)	38.2 (3.4)	38.9 (3.8)	45.0 (7.2)	48.2 (9.0)	54.6 (12.6)	65.8 (18.8)	70.6 (21.4)	68.6 (20.3)	63.1 (17.3)	52.8 (11.6)	44.6 (7.0)	36.6 (2.6)	52.3 (11.2)
Daily mean °F (°C)	26.4 (−3.1)	26.8 (−2.9)	32.4 (0.2)	36.5 (2.5)	42.9 (6.1)	52.9 (11.6)	58.2 (14.6)	56.3 (13.5)	50.4 (10.2)	40.9 (4.9)	33.1 (0.6)	25.6 (−3.6)	40.2 (4.6)
Mean daily minimum °F (°C)	14.6 (−9.7)	14.6 (−9.7)	19.8 (−6.8)	24.8 (−4.0)	31.3 (−0.4)	40.0 (4.4)	46.0 (7.8)	44.0 (6.7)	37.5 (3.1)	29.0 (−1.7)	21.6 (−5.8)	14.6 (−9.7)	28.2 (−2.1)
Mean minimum °F (°C)	−5.3 (−20.7)	−5.1 (−20.6)	3.2 (−16.0)	11.7 (−11.3)	20.9 (−6.2)	29.5 (−1.4)	38.6 (3.7)	36.2 (2.3)	26.6 (−3.0)	14.9 (−9.5)	3.3 (−15.9)	−5.6 (−20.9)	−10.0 (−23.3)
Record low °F (°C)	−21 (−29)	−16 (−27)	−5 (−21)	8 (−13)	13 (−11)	24 (−4)	33 (1)	31 (−1)	21 (−6)	0 (−18)	−7 (−22)	−21 (−29)	−21 (−29)
Average precipitation inches (mm)	2.63 (67)	2.87 (73)	2.71 (69)	1.98 (50)	1.44 (37)	0.75 (19)	2.51 (64)	2.14 (54)	1.88 (48)	2.17 (55)	2.20 (56)	2.52 (64)	25.8 (656)
Source 1: XMACIS2
Source 2: NOAA (Precipitation)

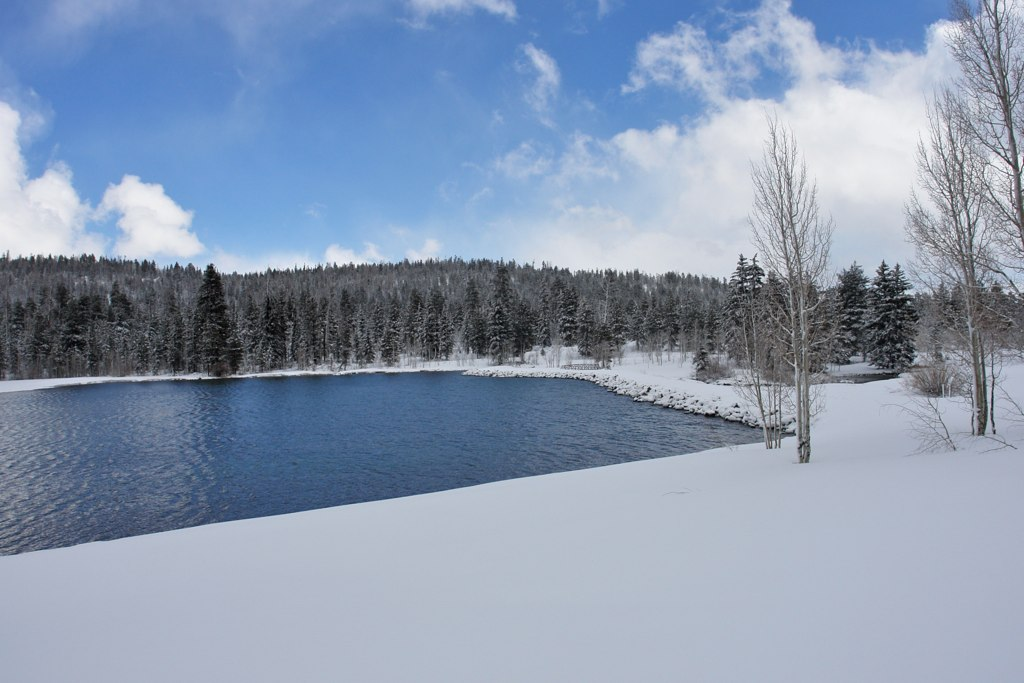
Duck Lake

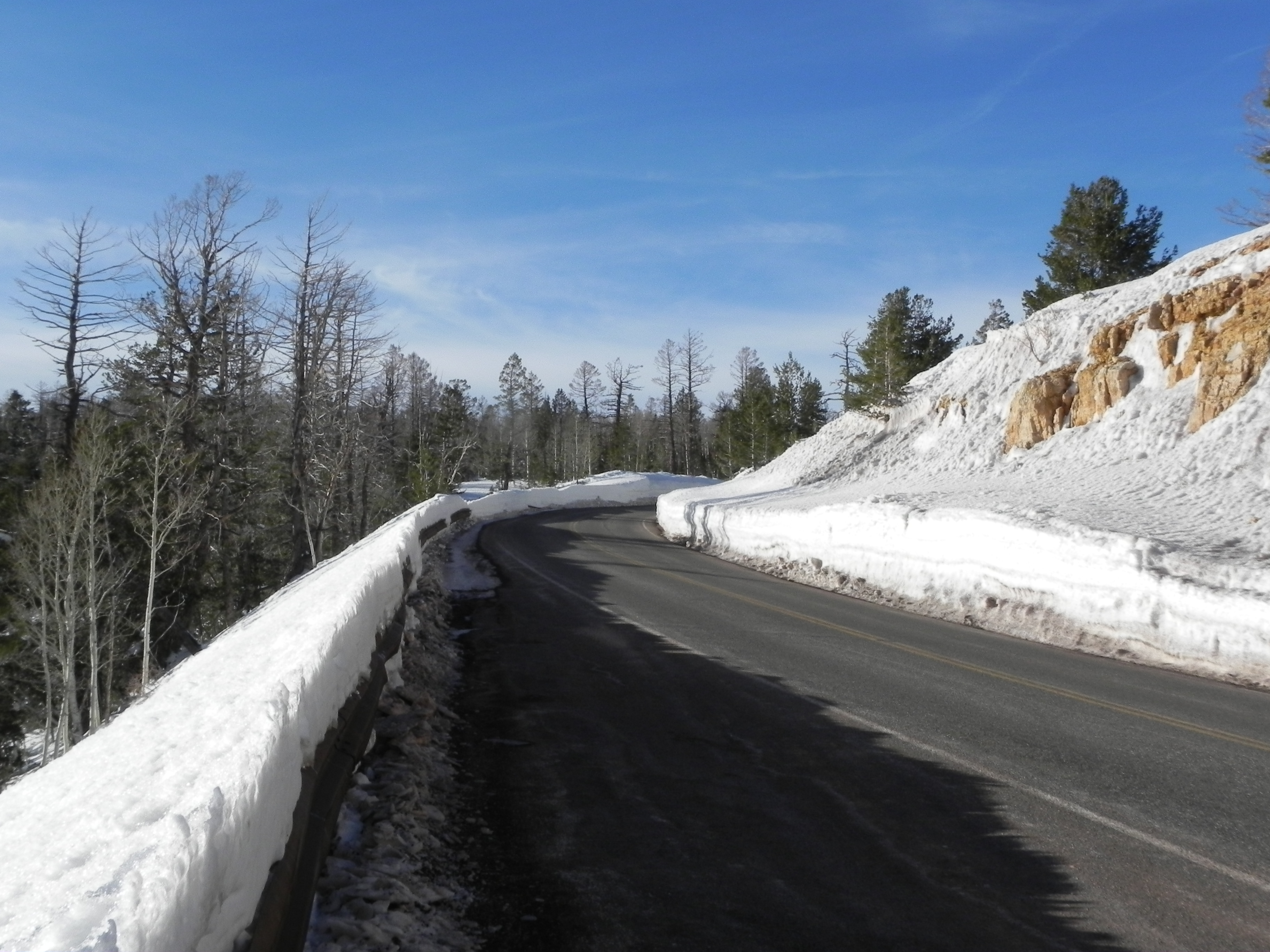
Utah State Route 14 near Navajo Lake

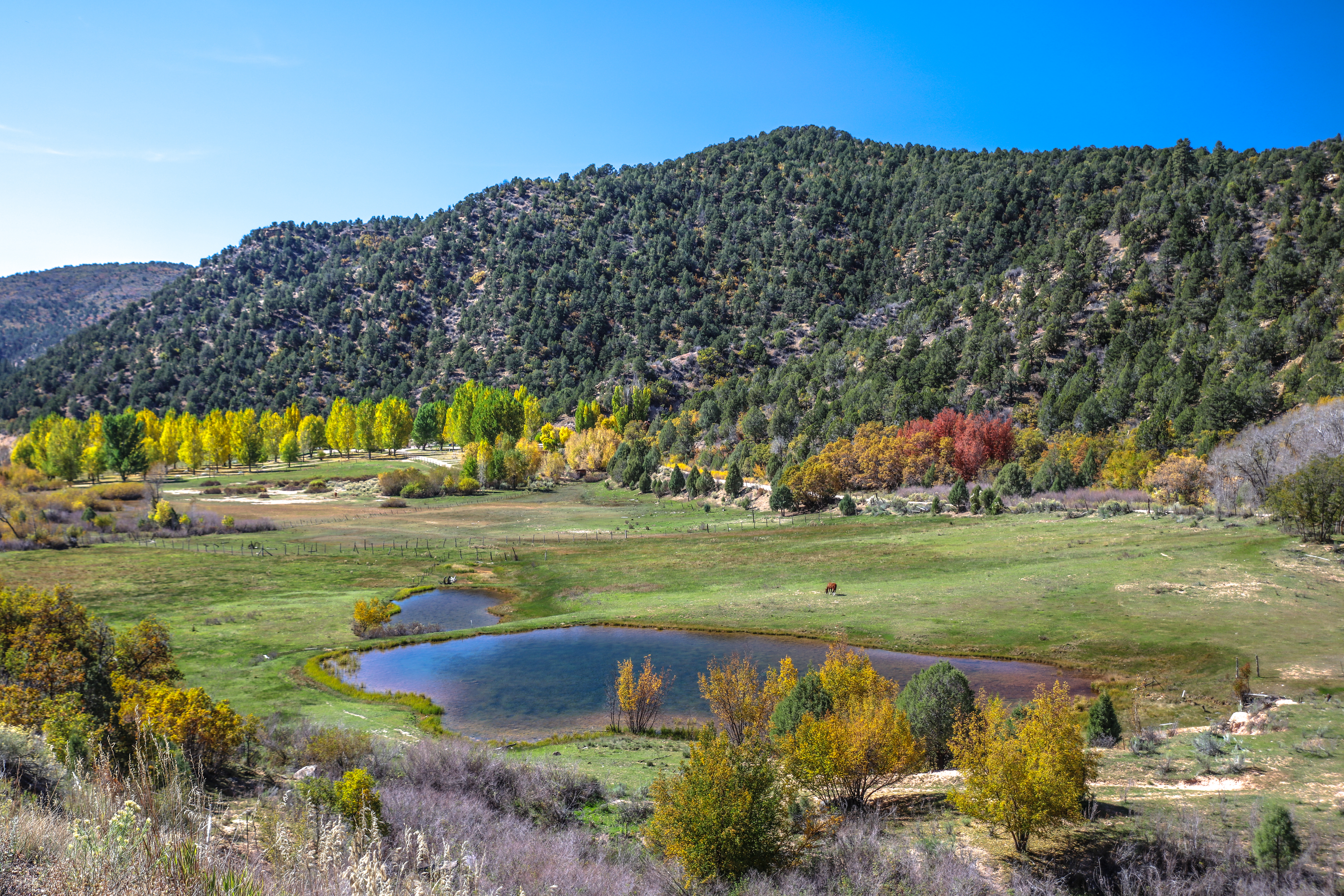
Duck Lake in autumn

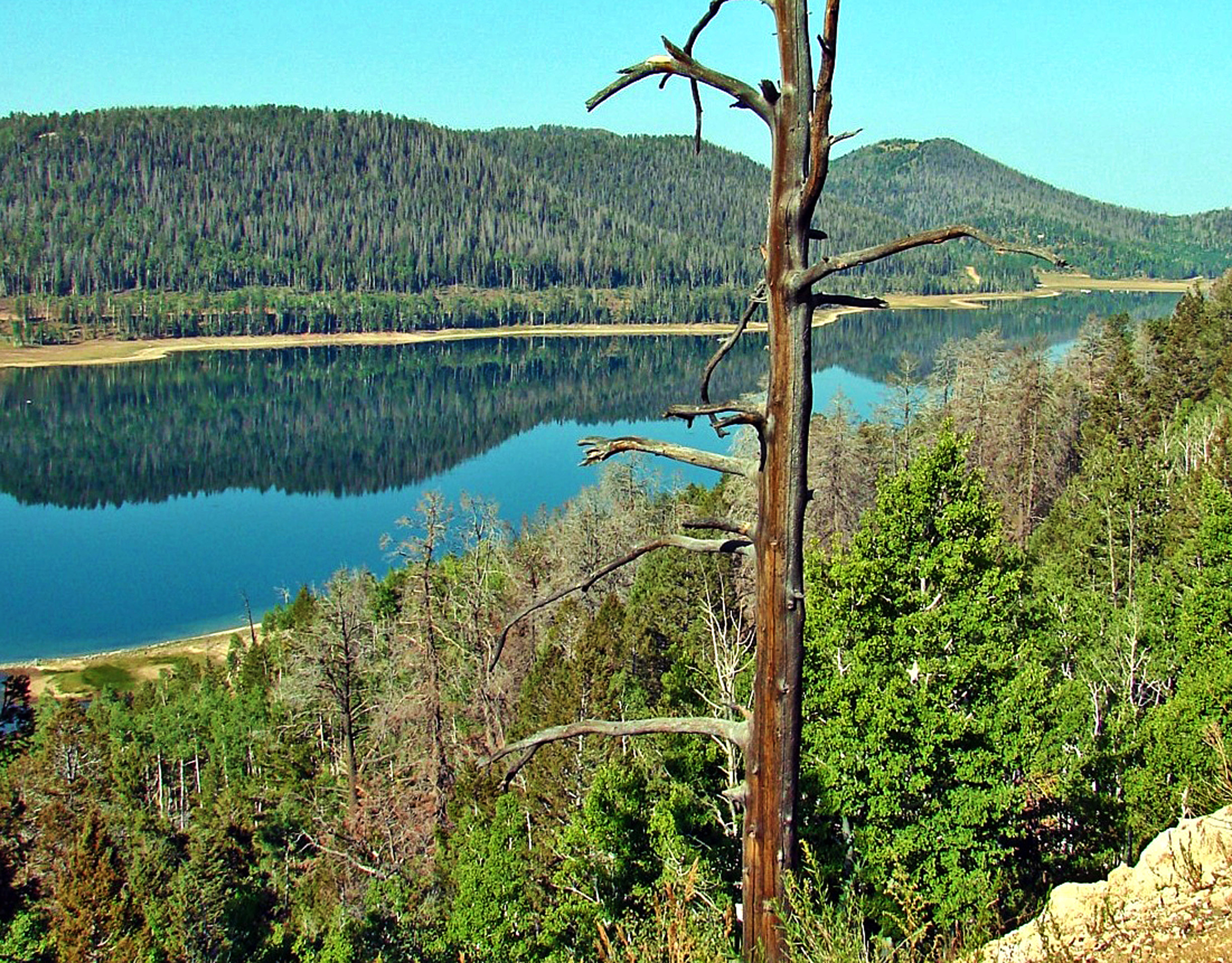
Navajo Lake

== Eruption history ==
Volcanism in the Markagunt volcanic field occurred in three stages. The first stage saw activity mainly at the margins of the Markagunt Plateau between 5.3 and 2.8 million years ago; the cinder cones and lava flows produced during this stage are heavily eroded. The second stage occurred along the Sevier fault and in the southern part of the field between 800,000 and 500,000 years ago; its cones and lava flows are moderately eroded. The third group was emplaced during the middle Pleistocene and Holocene.

Some individual vents:

- Dickinson Hill cinder cone and lava flows, 5.3 million years old.
- Houston Mountain flows, vent probably buried beneath younger volcanics. 5.3 million years old.
- Rock Canyon cinder cone and lava flow. Perhaps coeval with Dickinson Hill and may also be the source of the 4.98 - 4.94 million years old Red Canyon flows.
- Sidney Peaks basalt, probably of Pliocene age.
- Blue Spring Mountain cone and lava flow, 2.78 million years old.
- Horse Knoll cone and lava flows, 750,000 years old.
- Upper Bear Springs cone and lava flows, 750,000 years old.
- Long Flat lava flows, 600,000 years ago.
- Hancock Peak lava flows, probably same age as Long Flat.
- Asay Knoll, Bowers Knoll, Cooper Knoll and Strawberry Knolls cinder cones and lava flows, all probably around 500,000 years old.
- East Fork Deep Creek lava flow and eroded cinder cone, 300,000 years ago.
- The most recent stage vents cannot be reliably dated by radiometric dating and include Lake Hollow, Duck Creek, Midway Creek, Horse Pasture, Henrie Knolls, Red Desert, Navajo Lake, Dry Valley and the various Miller Knoll and Panguitch Lake flows and cinder cones.

=== Latest Pleistocene and Holocene ===
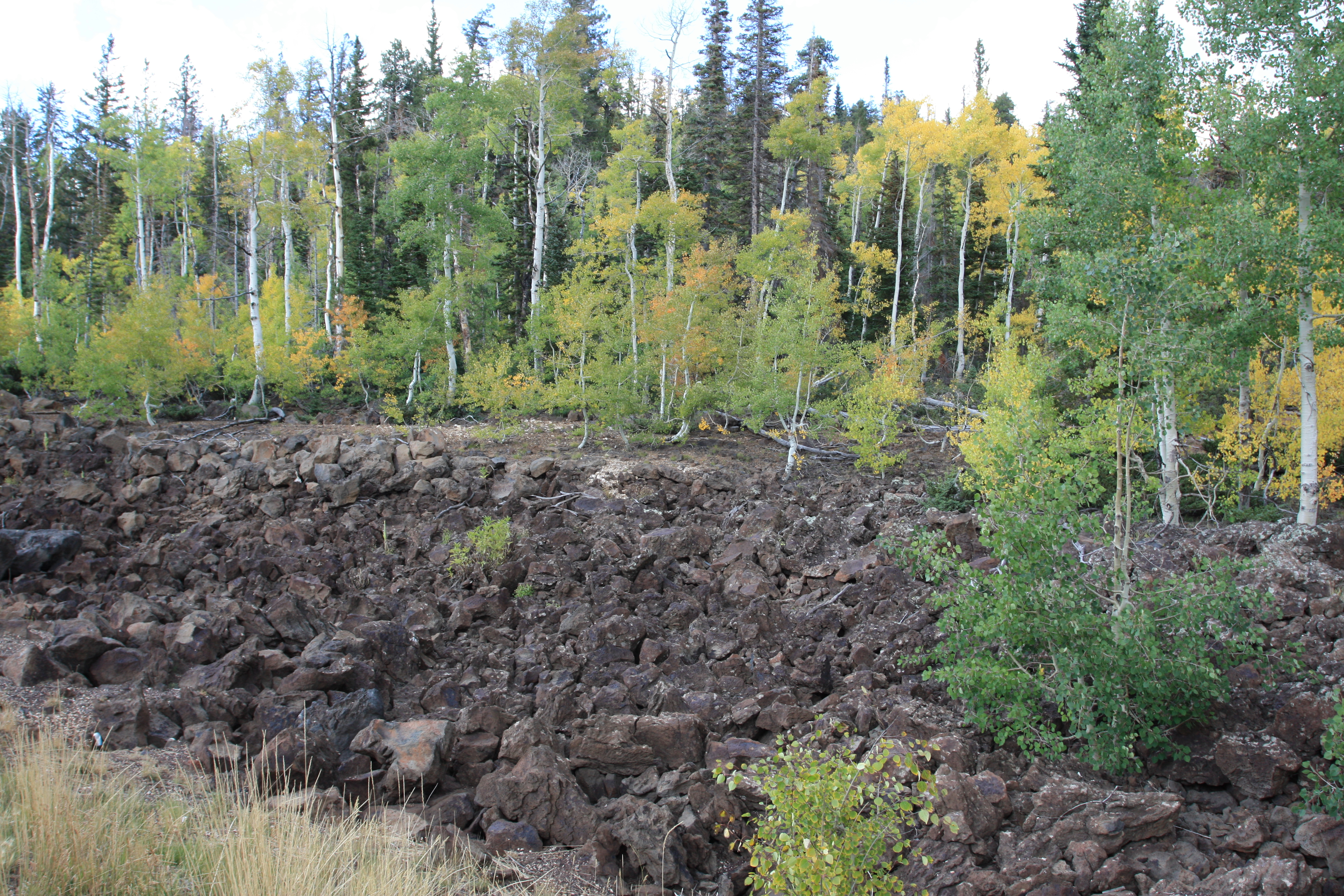
Lava flow near Duck Creek

The appearance and weathering characteristics of many volcanic structures imply that they have a recent age. Argon-argon dating has yielded an imprecise date of 58,000 ± 35,000 years ago for the Henrie Knolls lava flows. On the Miller Knoll flows, surface exposure dating has yielded ages of 38,000 - 36,000 years ago for the middle member and of 34,000 ± 4,000 and 32,000 ± 3,000 for two other flows which are likely of the same age. The middle member is overlaid by the Dry Valley flow which is also younger than the other two flows. The precise date of the last eruption is not known but eight cinder cones in the volcanic field appear to be less than 10,000 years old. The Southern Paiute settled into the region after 1,100 AD and their legends may contain references to lava flows.

Aside from volcanism, landsliding, aeolian, alluvial fan and floodplain sedimentation took place in the area, beavers built beaver dams on watercourses and peat accumulated at several sites. During the Pleistocene, the Bull Lake glaciation and the Pinedale glaciation took place on the Markagunt Plateau and eroded and buried some lava flows.

== Hazards ==
Large volcanic eruptions in the 1980s such as Mount St. Helens raised public awareness about the dangers emanating from volcanic activity. While most fatalities during volcanic eruptions occurred at silicic volcanoes, basaltic eruptions like these that occurred in Utah in the past are also potential sources of danger.

The Markagunt Plateau is considered to be a low-risk volcano. Renewed activity may impact the reservoir and popular recreation site of Navajo Lake less than 8 kilometres (5.0 mi) south of the Markagunt Plateau volcanic field as well as Utah State Route 14 and U.S. Route 89 which are constructed across lava flows from the volcanic field.

== See also ==
- Aquarius Plateau
- Black Rock Desert volcanic field
