= Monument Peak =

Monument Peak may refer to:

- Monument Peak (Riverside County), California in the Temescal Mountains
- Monument Peak (San Bernardino County), California in the San Bernardino Mountains
- Monument Peak (Mendocino County), California
- Monument Peak (Milpitas, California)
- Monument Peak (San Diego County), California in the Lagune Mountains
- Monument Peak (Idaho)
- Monument Peak in Beaverhead County, Montana
- Monument Peak in Sweet Grass County, Montana
- Monument Peak in Washoe County, Montana
- Monument Peak (Nevada)
- Monument Peak (Utah)
- Monument Peak (Washington)
- Brian Head, Utah, a town previously named Monument Peak
- Brian Head (mountain), a peak previously named Monument Peak

== See also ==
- Monument Mountain
