= Monument Mountain =

Monument Mountain may refer to several summits in the United States, including:

- Monument Mountain (Berkshire County, Massachusetts)
  - Monument Mountain (reservation), an open space preserve
- Monument Mountain, an underground mountain located in Wyandotte Caves of Indiana

== See also ==
- Monument Peak (disambiguation)
- Monument Nunataks, Antarctica
