= Gold Springs Resource =

Canadian mining company

Gold Springs Resource Corp.
- Formerly: South American Silver Corp., TriMetals Mining Inc.
- Type: Public
- Traded as: TSX: GRC, OTCQB: GRCAF
- Industry: Mineral Exploration
- Headquarters: Vancouver, British Columbia, Canada
- Key people: Antonio Canton, President and CEO (2021-current)
- Products: gold, silver
- Subsidiaries: High Desert Gold Corporation
- Website: goldspringsresource.com

Gold Springs Resource Corp is a Canadian company that is pursuing the development of the Gold Springs gold-silver mine on the border of Utah and Nevada in the United States. Headquartered in Vancouver, the company is listed on the Toronto Stock Exchange in Canada and the OTCQX market exchange in the US. The company was founded in 2006 as the South American Silver Corporation, an equity carve-out of the General Minerals Corporation, to pursue exploration and development of the Malku Khota and Laurani mineral properties in Bolivia and the Escalones property in Chile. Following the nationalization of the Malku Khota property by the Government of Bolivia and the company's merger with the High Desert Gold Corporation for its Gold Springs project, the combined company renamed itself TriMetals Mining Inc in 2014. The company again renamed itself, this time to "Gold Springs Resource Corp", in 2019 after that project emerged as its principal asset.

== Corporate history ==
Gold Springs Resource Corp was created as the South American Silver Corporation on September 28, 2006, as an equity carve-out subsidiary of General Minerals Corporation (which later re-named to Sprott Resource Corporation). It held three mineral exploration properties: Malku Khota and Laurani mineral properties in Bolivia and the Escalones property in Chile. It underwent an initial public offering on the Toronto Stock Exchange on February 19, 2007. While their exploration rights to the Laurani gold-silver-copper property in La Paz expired in 2009, and its expenses written off, the Malku Khota had a preliminary economic assessment completed demonstrating a high grade silver-indium-gallium deposit. However, despite its community relations program, the Malku Khota project was locally divisive and opposed by several indigenous groups, resulting in intimidation and violence. After failed mediation efforts by the Potosí Department, the Evo Morales government nationalized the property in 2012 so that the mine would not be developed. Stock in the company had peaked in 2011 at over $2.00 a share but plummeted to $0.30 in 2012 after the loss of Malku Khota. The company sought US$385.7 million in compensation but the Permanent Court of Arbitration only, eventually, awarded them US$18.7 million plus interest, though the two parties settled for US$25.7 million in 2019 as part of a larger deal which included transferring exploration data.

After exiting Bolivia, the company acquired a 20% stake in TSX Venture Exchange-listed High Desert Gold in 2013 and the remainder of the outstanding shares in 2014. Soon afterwards, the company, then named South American Silver, changed its name to TriMetals Mining effective March 17, 2014. They continued exploration efforts in the Escalones property in Chile, but the Gold Springs property acquired from High Desert Gold emerged as their principal asset. They completed a preliminary economic assessment Gold Springs property and then renamed the company to Gold Springs Resource Corp. in 2019.

== Gold Springs ==
Located in both western Iron County, Utah and eastern Lincoln County, Nevada, the Gold Springs project is an advanced exploration stage gold and silver project. It consists of 961 unpatented lode claims, 13 patented lode claims, four State of Utah leases, and one surface real estate deed parcel and right-of-way covering a total of approximately 7,470 hectares (ha). The Gold Springs property is held by TriMetals through Gold Springs LLC, a wholly owned subsidiary of High Desert Gold Corporation (“HDG”). Prior to March 17, 2014, TMI was known as South American Silver Corp., which acquired 100% ownership of HDG on December 20, 2013. HDG is now a wholly owned subsidiary of TMI.

== Other holdings ==
Located in Santiago Metropolitan Region, the Escalones property is a copper, silver, gold, and molybdenum porphyry and skarn prospect. The property is located 35 km east from El Teniente, the world’s largest underground copper mine, and 100 kilometers south-east of Santiago, Chile. According to a detailed Feb 2012 NI 43—101 technical report provided within South American Silver Corp.’s 2011 corporate report, Escalones possesses a newly defined Inferred Resource of 420 million tonnes of mineralized material contains 3.8 billion pounds of copper, 56.9 million pounds of molybdenum, 610,000 ounces of gold and 16.8 million ounces of silver.
