= Demerger =

Form of corporate restructuring

A demerger is a form of corporate restructuring whereby parts of a business are separated into different corporations. It is the converse of a merger or acquisition. Companies demerge for various strategic reasons, such as improving the focus within a business or raising capital, and can be forced to do so, in some jurisdictions, due to government intervention to improve market competition. Demerging a public company will often result in an immediate fluctuation in share price. Demerging can also occur prior to the newly formed company or companies being listed on the stock market.

== Types and purpose ==
A demerger can take place through a spin-off, where the holding company gains equity in the new corporation that is the same as the loss of equity in the company that demerged. A split-off occurs when multiple new companies are formed from the original business. A partial demerger occurs when the holding company retains a reduced stake in the new company created. Demergers can also occur as a result of liquidating a company and transferring assets to new companies. Divestments differ from demergers, as they involve selling aspects of an existing business to new owners, in some instances to reverse a previous merger.

Demergers can be undertaken for various business and non-business reasons, such as government intervention, by way of antitrust law, or through decartelization, as a defensive corporate strategy to avoid government intervention, as a way of improving the focus on the core business and competencies, and when remaining as part of a single business offers little advantage due to different parts of a business not making each part more efficient. Demergers can occur so a company can increase investment and capital, and have also been used as a method of preventing a hostile takeover.

== Examples ==
An example of a demerger, was eBay's decision to create a separate corporate entity for PayPal, in 2014. The announcement led to a 7.5% increase in eBay's share price. At the time the decision was announced, PayPals growth in revenues was double that of eBay's, whilst significant new entrants such as Apple Pay had entered the online payments market, increasing competition. In the same year, 18% of demergers in the US occurred within the technology sector.

A Prudential demerger in 2018 resulted in the creation of M&G Prudential, which would focus mainly on the UK and European markets, whilst Prudential plc would be focused on markets such as Asia and the US. M&G Prudential was subsequently listed on the stock market. When Associated British Foods took the decision to demerge Primark in 2026, the immediate market reaction was its share price falling. To improve focus and attract investors, Vedanta demerged, with the outcome being five separate businesses in 2026, with the demerged companies expected to list on the stock market.

== See also ==
- Equity carve-out
- Successor company
