= Utah State Route 14 =

State highway in Utah, United States

State Route 14
- Markagunt High Plateau Scenic Byway
- Map of Utah State Route 14

Route information
- Maintained by UDOT
- Length: 40.995 mi (65.975 km)
- Existed: 1912 as a state highway; 1920s as SR-14–present

Major junctions
- West end: SR-130 in Cedar City
- SR-148 near Cedar Breaks National Monument
- East end: US 89 at Long Valley Junction

Location
- Country: United States
- State: Utah
- Counties: Iron, Kane

Highway system
- Utah State Highway System; Interstate; US; State; Minor; Scenic
← SR-13	→ I-15

State Route 14 (SR-14) is a state highway in southern Utah, running for 40.995 miles (65.975 km) in Iron and Kane Counties from Cedar City to Long Valley Junction. The highway has been designated the Markagaunt High Plateau Scenic Byway as part of the Utah Scenic Byways program.

== Route description ==
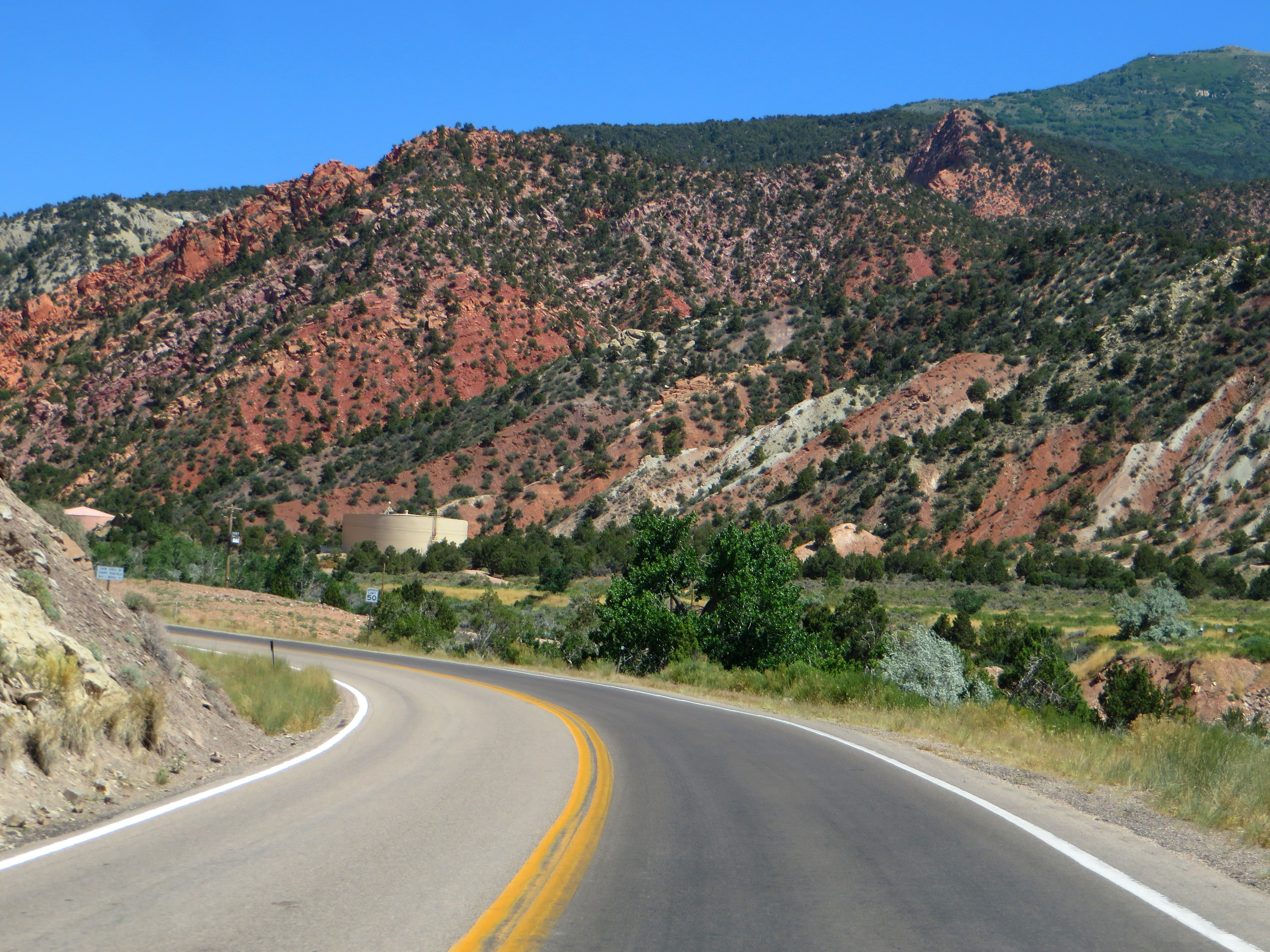
SR-14 heading east out of Cedar City, June 2017

As the ascent up the Markagunt Plateau features steep grades and sharp curves the Utah Department of Transportation has prohibited all vehicles exceeding 12 feet (3.7 m) wide or 65 feet (19.8 m) long. All vehicles exceeding 8.5 feet (2.6 m) wide are required to have pilot escorts.

SR-14 begins at an intersection with SR-130 in central Cedar City and heads east out of the city. It then turns southeast and climbs into the Markagunt Plateau, then intersects SR-148 to Cedar Breaks National Monument and Brian Head. It then continues generally southeast past Navajo Lake and through Duck Creek Village before ending at an intersection with US-89 at Long Valley Junction.

== History ==
The road from SR-1 (by 1926 US-91, now SR-130) in Cedar City to SR-11 (US-89) at Long Valley Junction was added to the state highway system in 1912 and numbered SR-14 in the 1920s. A branch from Cedar Breaks Junction to Cedar Breaks National Monument was added in 1927, but in 1931 it was renumbered SR-55, and is now part of SR-148.

On October 8, 2011, a mountainside adjacent to the highway near mile marker 8 gave way and a landslide removed about 1300 feet of roadway, closing the highway for more than seven months. The road reopened to limited traffic on May 12 and was fully opened on August 4, 2012. A similar incident took place in 1989, closing the highway for months until repairs were made.

== Major intersections ==
County	Location	mi	km	Destinations	Notes
Iron	Cedar City	0.000	0.000	SR-130 (Main Street) – Minersville	Western terminus
Iron	Brian Head	18.172	29.245	SR-148 north (Cedar Breaks Scenic Byway) – Cedar Breaks National Monument, Brian Head	Cedar Breaks National Monument
Kane	Long Valley Junction	40.995	65.975	US 89 – Kanab, Panguitch	Eastern terminus
1.000 mi = 1.609 km; 1.000 km = 0.621 mi

== See also ==
- List of state highways in Utah
