= Cedar Highlands, Utah =

Unincorporated community in Utah, United States

- Unincorporated community Census designated place
- Interactive map of Cedar Highlands, Utah
- Coordinates: 37°38′09″N 113°02′20″W
- Country: United States
- State: Utah
- Settled: 1981
- Incorporated: January 1, 2018
- Disincorporated: October 10, 2020

Area
  - Total: 8.99 sq mi (23.28 km^{2})
  - Land: 8.99 sq mi (23.28 km^{2})
  - Water: 0.00 sq mi (0 km^{2})
- Elevation: 7,815 ft (2,382 m)

Population (2020)
  - Total: 99
  - Density: 11/sq mi (4.3/km^{2})
- Time zone: UTC-7 (Mountain (MST))
  - Summer (DST): UTC-6 (MDT)
- ZIP code: 84720
- Area code: 435
- FIPS code: 49-11435
- GNIS feature ID: 2829873
- Website: www.cedarhighlands.org

Cedar Highlands is a subdivision east of Cedar City in Iron County, Utah. It was incorporated as a town in 2018, but this was dissolved in 2020 following a vote of the residents. The population at the 2020 census was 99, significantly down from 368 at the 2010 census.

== History ==
The community, established in 1981, was originally a private development, consisting of cabins managed by a HOA. It stayed at that political level, with various calls for incorporation over the years until the formal process began in 2015, with a vote for incorporation happening in November 2016 (79-44 for incorporation). The formal certificate of incorporation from the State of Utah was issued on December 7, 2017.

Despite concerns about incorporation, some residents felt it was necessary due to concerns about how property taxes were being used (at the county level rather than being held locally) as well as issues with fire management and road grade that appeared to be outside the HOA's purview. Additionally, incorporation made it possible for the community to apply for regional and national grants.

After incorporation, the foundational swearing in of leaders took place on January 5, 2018. The first inaugurated government consisted of Mayor Steven C. Swann, with town council members Susan Allman, Beth Gaines, Linda Stetzenbach, and Paul Starks. The ceremony took place on the campus of Southern Utah University, as no government buildings existed in the community.

Cedar Highlands was the first town incorporated after the 2016 Utah State Legislature changed the process of incorporation to be overseen by the office of the Lieutenant Governor’s rather than by local county governments.

On May 14, 2020, the town voted 73-12 in favor of disbanding and reverting to unincorporated status. The Certificate of Dissolution from the State of Utah was issued by the Lieutenant Governor on October 10, 2020.

=== Government ===
An audit by the State Auditor in April 2019, found that the town had several violations related to accounting, records, and other matters. The resulting administrative changes in government caused a significant rift between Mayor Swann and his council, resulting in his resignation on June 28, 2019. While the news was well received by some, it was a surprise to members of the town council, who claimed that the impasse was a matter of differing visions, while the Mayor claimed the town was taking on additional liabilities.

After notice was posted for the position of mayor, Jim Byler was chosen amongst candidates for the mayoral appointment. He was known locally for being openly critical of the previous Mayor Swann, running an online site that discussed management issues in the community. On July 17, He was sworn in, alongside a new treasurer (Beth Gaines) and town clerk (Jeanne Shelton). Byler promised additional transparency with the finances of the council, citing a difficult transition between the office with Swann.
