= Dan Leigh Hollow =

Valley in Utah, United States

Coordinates: 37.5663663°N 112.9721683°W

Dan Leigh Hollow is a valley in Iron County, Utah, United States. It is located about 10 miles (16 km) southeast of Cedar City.

The stream that flows through the hollow empties into the O'Neil Gulch.

Dan Leigh Hollow has the name of Daniel T. Leigh, a pioneer settler.

== See also ==
- List of canyons and gorges in Utah
