= Iron County, Utah =

County in Utah, United States

- County
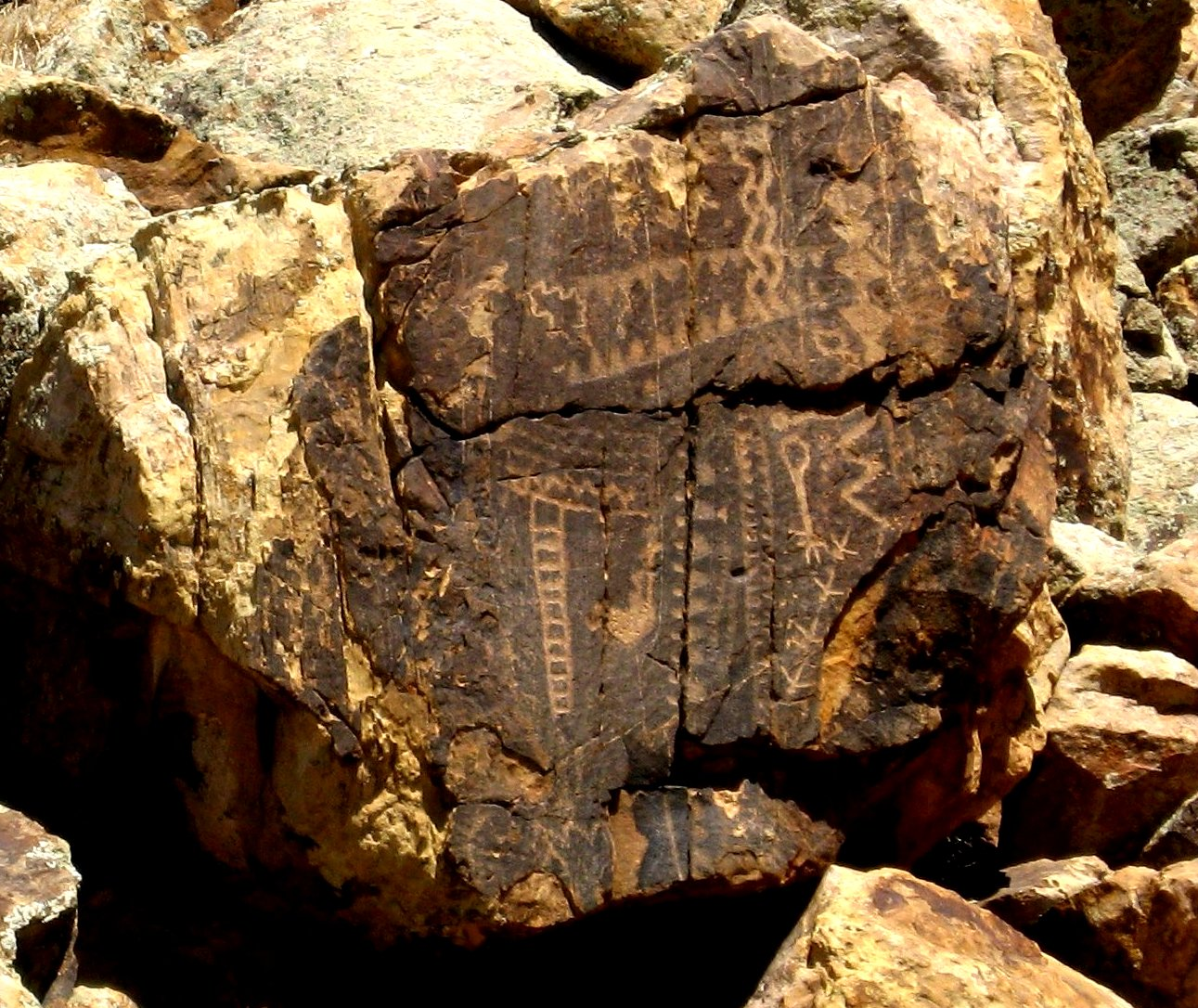
- The Parowan Gap petroglyphs, a well-known landmark in Iron County, July 2007

- Location within the U.S. state of Utah
- Coordinates: 37.86°N 113.28°W
- Country: United States
- State: Utah
- Founded: January 31, 1850 (created); January 17, 1851 (organized)
- Named for: Iron mines
- Seat: Parowan
- Largest city: Cedar City

Area
  - Total: 3,301 sq mi (8,550 km^{2})
  - Land: 3,297 sq mi (8,540 km^{2})
  - Water: 4.4 sq mi (11 km^{2}) 0.1%

Population (2020)
  - Total: 57,289
  - Estimate (2025): 67,141 ▲
  - Density: 17.38/sq mi (6.709/km^{2})
- Time zone: UTC−7 (Mountain)
  - Summer (DST): UTC−6 (MDT)
- Congressional district: 2nd
- Website: ironcountyut.gov

Iron County is a county in southwestern Utah, United States. As of the 2020 United States census, the population was 57,289. Its county seat is Parowan, and the largest city is Cedar City. The Cedar City, UT Micropolitan Statistical Area includes all of Iron County.

== History ==
Evidence of Fremont culture habitation ranging from 750 to 1250 AD exists in present Iron County. Petroglyphs of differing periods were carved into the walls of Parowan Gap NW of Parowan. Paiutes roamed the Parowan Valley in the centuries before Euro-American exploration; their descendants are now represented by the Southern Paiute Indian Reservation, which is headquartered in Cedar City.

The Domínguez–Escalante expedition traveled through the Iron County area on October 12, 1776. Fur trapper Jedediah Smith is the first recorded Anglo-American to pass through the area (1826). Settlement of the area began in 1851, when LDS President Brigham Young directed members from the northern colonies to move into the area. A settlement, Coal Creek, sprang up in 1851; it later became Cedar City. To provide a local government structure, the State of Deseret legislature created the county on January 31, 1850, although it was not organized until January 17, 1851, with description stretching from the future Colorado, across Utah, and into the future Nevada. It was named "Little Salt Lake County" at creation, but on December 3, 1850, a legislative act changed its name to Iron County. Its borders were altered in 1850, 1852, 1854, 1856, and 1861. Also, in 1861, the federal government created the Colorado Territory, which administratively removed Iron County areas east of 109 degrees longitude.

The county borders were altered in 1862. Also, in 1862, the federal government created the Nevada Territory, which administratively removed Iron County areas west of 114 degrees longitude. Further boundary adjustments were passed in 1866, 1880, 1882, 1883, and 1884. The final adjustment was made in 1892; the county borders have remained in their current arrangement.

== Geography ==
Iron County lies on the west edge of Utah. Its west border abuts the east border of the state of Nevada. The Iron County terrain is a study in contrast to its arid western reaches of the Escalante Desert and Great Basin ranges to the meadows and forests of the High Plateau on the east. The Markagunt Plateau is creased by the colorful formations of Cedar Breaks National Monument. Brian Head is the county's highest point, at 11,307 feet (3,446 m) ASL. The county has a total area of 3,301 square miles (8,550 km^{2}), of which 3,297 square miles (8,540 km^{2}) is land and 4.4 square miles (11 km^{2}) (0.1%) is water.

=== Major highways ===
- Interstate 15
- Utah State Route 14
- Utah State Route 56
- Utah State Route 130
- Utah State Route 143
- Utah State Route 148

=== Adjacent counties ===
- Beaver County - north
- Garfield County - east
- Kane County - southeast
- Washington County - south
- Lincoln County, Nevada - west

=== Protected areas ===
- Cedar Breaks National Monument
- Dixie National Forest (part)
- Fishlake National Forest (part)
- Red Cliffs National Conservation Area (part)
- Zion National Park (part)

=== Lakes ===
- Little Salt Lake
- Newcastle Reservoir
- Quichapa Lake

=== Valleys ===
- Dan Leigh Hollow

== Demographics ==
Historical population
Census	Pop.	Note	%±
1850	360		—
1860	1,010		180.6%
1870	2,277		125.4%
1880	4,013		76.2%
1890	2,683		−33.1%
1900	3,546		32.2%
1910	3,933		10.9%
1920	5,787		47.1%
1930	7,227		24.9%
1940	8,331		15.3%
1950	9,642		15.7%
1960	10,795		12.0%
1970	12,177		12.8%
1980	17,349		42.5%
1990	20,789		19.8%
2000	33,779		62.5%
2010	46,163		36.7%
2020	57,289		24.1%
2025 (est.)	67,141	▲	17.2%
US Decennial Census; 1790–1960 1900–1990; 1990–2000 2010 2020

=== Racial and ethnic composition ===
Iron County, Utah – Racial and ethnic composition Note: the US Census treats Hispanic/Latino as an ethnic category. This table excludes Latinos from the racial categories and assigns them to a separate category. Hispanics/Latinos may be of any race.
Race / Ethnicity (NH = Non-Hispanic)	Pop 1980	Pop 1990	Pop 2000	Pop 2010	Pop 2020	% 1980	% 1990	% 2000	% 2010	% 2020
White alone (NH)	16,634	19,669	30,829	40,226	47,620	95.88%	94.61%	91.27%	87.14%	83.12%
Black or African American alone (NH)	17	40	108	204	375	0.10%	0.19%	0.32%	0.44%	0.65%
Native American or Alaska Native alone (NH)	372	612	692	907	948	2.14%	2.94%	2.05%	1.96%	1.65%
Asian alone (NH)	61	85	249	333	621	0.35%	0.41%	0.74%	0.72%	1.08%
Native Hawaiian or Pacific Islander alone (NH)	x	x	88	137	237	x	x	0.26%	0.30%	0.41%
Other race alone (NH)	26	1	38	49	154	0.15%	0.00%	0.11%	0.11%	0.27%
Mixed race or Multiracial (NH)	x	x	392	744	1,852	x	x	1.16%	1.61%	3.23%
Hispanic or Latino (any race)	239	382	1,383	3,563	5,482	1.38%	1.84%	4.09%	7.72%	9.57%
Total	17,349	20,789	33,779	46,163	57,289	100.00%	100.00%	100.00%	100.00%	100.00%

=== 2020 census ===
According to the 2020 United States census and 2020 American Community Survey, there were 57,289 people in Iron County with a population density of 17.4 people per square mile (6.7/km^{2}). Among non-Hispanic or Latino people, the racial makeup was 47,620 (83.1%) White, 375 (0.7%) African American, 948 (1.7%) Native American, 621 (1.1%) Asian, 237 (0.4%) Pacific Islander, 154 (0.3%) from other races, and 1,852 (3.2%) from two or more races. 5,482 (9.6%) people were Hispanic or Latino.

There were 28,404 (49.58%) males and 28,885 (50.42%) females, and the population distribution by age was 16,259 (28.4%) under the age of 18, 33,214 (58.0%) from 18 to 64, and 7,816 (13.6%) who were at least 65 years old. The median age was 28.9 years.

There were 18,731 households in Iron County with an average size of 3.06 of which 13,596 (72.6%) were families and 5,135 (27.4%) were non-families. Among all families, 10,799 (57.7%) were married couples, 978 (5.2%) were male householders with no spouse, and 1,819 (9.7%) were female householders with no spouse. Among all non-families, 3,592 (19.2%) were a single person living alone and 1,543 (8.2%) were two or more people living together. 6,906 (36.9%) of all households had children under the age of 18. 12,133 (64.8%) of households were owner-occupied while 6,598 (35.2%) were renter-occupied.

The median income for an Iron County household was $52,045 and the median family income was $63,633, with a per-capita income of $22,409. The median income for males that were full-time employees was $45,178 and for females $33,841. 16.4% of the population and 10.2% of families were below the poverty line.

In terms of education attainment, out of the 29,881 people in Iron County 25 years or older, 1,977 (6.6%) had not completed high school, 6,903 (23.1%) had a high school diploma or equivalency, 12,374 (41.4%) had some college or associate degree, 6,205 (20.8%) had a bachelor's degree, and 2,422 (8.1%) had a graduate or professional degree.

=== Ancestry ===
The top 5 ethnic groups in Iron County are:

- English: 29%
- German: 10%
- Irish: 7%
- Scottish: 5%
- Danish: 5%

== Recreation ==
- Woods Ranch Recreation Area, a recreation area located in a pine/aspen forest with hiking, fishing, picnic areas, a volleyball court and restroom facilities.
- Three Peaks Recreation Area, a recreation area made up of volcanic rock and hills. The area features rock climbing, picnics, fishing, off-road vehicle use and bike riding.
- Shooting Range
- Brian Head Ski Resort

== Politics and government ==
Iron County is an overwhelmingly Republican county in presidential elections, having not voted Democratic since 1936. Indeed, in no national election since the 1964 Lyndon B. Johnson landslide has the county given any Democratic presidential candidate 25 percent of its ballots.

State elected offices
Position	District	Name	Affiliation	First elected
Senate	28	Evan Vickers	Republican	2012
House of Representatives	71	Bradley Last	Republican	2002
House of Representatives	72	Rex Shipp	Republican	2018
Board of Education	15	Kristan Norton	Republican	2020

United States presidential election results for Iron County, Utah
Year	Republican		Democratic		Third party(ies)	
Year	No.	%	No.	%	No.	%
1896	205	20.28%	806	79.72%	0	0.00%
1900	628	46.94%	708	52.91%	2	0.15%
1904	741	58.72%	442	35.02%	79	6.26%
1908	712	55.80%	488	38.24%	76	5.96%
1912	695	49.71%	544	38.91%	159	11.37%
1916	825	40.03%	1,156	56.09%	80	3.88%
1920	1,399	69.60%	561	27.91%	50	2.49%
1924	1,429	66.47%	485	22.56%	236	10.98%
1928	1,823	72.11%	682	26.98%	23	0.91%
1932	1,599	50.55%	1,358	42.93%	206	6.51%
1936	1,396	42.44%	1,844	56.07%	49	1.49%
1940	2,060	51.53%	1,915	47.90%	23	0.58%
1944	1,930	53.30%	1,677	46.31%	14	0.39%
1948	2,289	58.53%	1,596	40.81%	26	0.66%
1952	3,175	66.55%	1,596	33.45%	0	0.00%
1956	3,321	71.70%	1,311	28.30%	0	0.00%
1960	3,079	63.91%	1,738	36.07%	1	0.02%
1964	2,522	55.13%	2,053	44.87%	0	0.00%
1968	3,337	66.59%	1,157	23.09%	517	10.32%
1972	5,085	76.49%	1,098	16.52%	465	6.99%
1976	4,757	69.62%	1,700	24.88%	376	5.50%
1980	6,207	79.54%	1,242	15.91%	355	4.55%
1984	6,856	83.09%	1,342	16.26%	53	0.64%
1988	6,038	76.74%	1,736	22.06%	94	1.19%
1992	5,616	59.88%	1,537	16.39%	2,225	23.73%
1996	6,550	69.75%	1,887	20.09%	954	10.16%
2000	10,106	80.24%	1,789	14.21%	699	5.55%
2004	12,815	82.97%	2,267	14.68%	364	2.36%
2008	12,518	75.06%	3,258	19.53%	902	5.41%
2012	14,200	84.47%	2,148	12.78%	463	2.75%
2016	11,561	64.84%	2,450	13.74%	3,820	21.42%
2020	18,989	76.29%	4,892	19.65%	1,009	4.05%
2024	21,571	77.38%	5,683	20.39%	624	2.24%

== Communities ==
Map of Iron County communities

=== Cities ===
- Cedar City
- Enoch
- Parowan (county seat)

=== Towns ===
- Brian Head
- Kanarraville
- Paragonah

=== Census-designated places ===
- Beryl Junction
- Modena
- Newcastle
- Summit

=== Unincorporated communities ===
- Beryl
- Buckhorn Springs
- Cedar Highlands
- Hamiltons Fort
- Hamlin Valley
- Lund
- Old Irontown
- State Line
- Zane

=== Former communities ===
- Gold Springs
- Iron Springs, named for the Iron Springs
- Uvada

== Education ==
There is one school district, Iron School District.

== See also ==
- List of counties in Utah
- National Register of Historic Places listings in Iron County, Utah
