= Utah State Route 149 =

State highway in Utah, United States

State Route 149
- SR-149 highlighted in red

Route information
- Maintained by UDOT
- Length: 4.219 mi (6.790 km)
- Existed: 1933–present

Major junctions
- South end: US 40 in Jensen
- North end: Dinosaur National Monument boundary

Location
- Country: United States
- State: Utah

Highway system
- Utah State Highway System; Interstate; US; State; Minor; Scenic
| ← SR-148 | → SR-150 |

State Route 149 (SR-149) is a state highway in Uintah County in the U.S. state of Utah that connects U.S. Route 40 (US-40) in the town of Jensen with Dinosaur National Monument, 4.2 miles (6.8 km) to the north.

== Route description ==
State Route 149 starts in the town of Jensen, Utah, travelling north on 9500 East. As it leaves town, it turns slightly to the east as the road turns into Quarry Entrance Road. While the road continues north into the Dinosaur National Monument, the legislated route ends at the monument boundary.

== History ==
Route 149 was established on June 26, 1933, as the road from Jensen to the museum at Dinosaur National Monument. No changes were made to the route until August 20, 1987, when the state legislature determined that because state maintenance of the road ended at the monument boundary, the state route should be shortened so the route would also end at the boundary.

== Major intersections ==
The entire route is in Uintah County.

| Location | mi | km | Destinations | Notes |
|---|---|---|---|---|
| Jensen | 0.000 | 0.000 | US 40 | Southern terminus |
| | 4.219 | 6.790 | Dinosaur National Monument boundary | Northern terminus |
1.000 mi = 1.609 km; 1.000 km = 0.621 mi
