= Mammoth Cave (Utah) =

Lava tube in the Dixie National Forest, Utah

Coordinates: 37°34′05″N 112°35′18″W

- Interactive map of Mammoth Cave
- Location: Markagunt Plateau
- Length: 400 m
- Geology: Lava tube
- Entrances: 5
- Difficulty: Moderate
- Hazards: Low temperature
- Access: Open

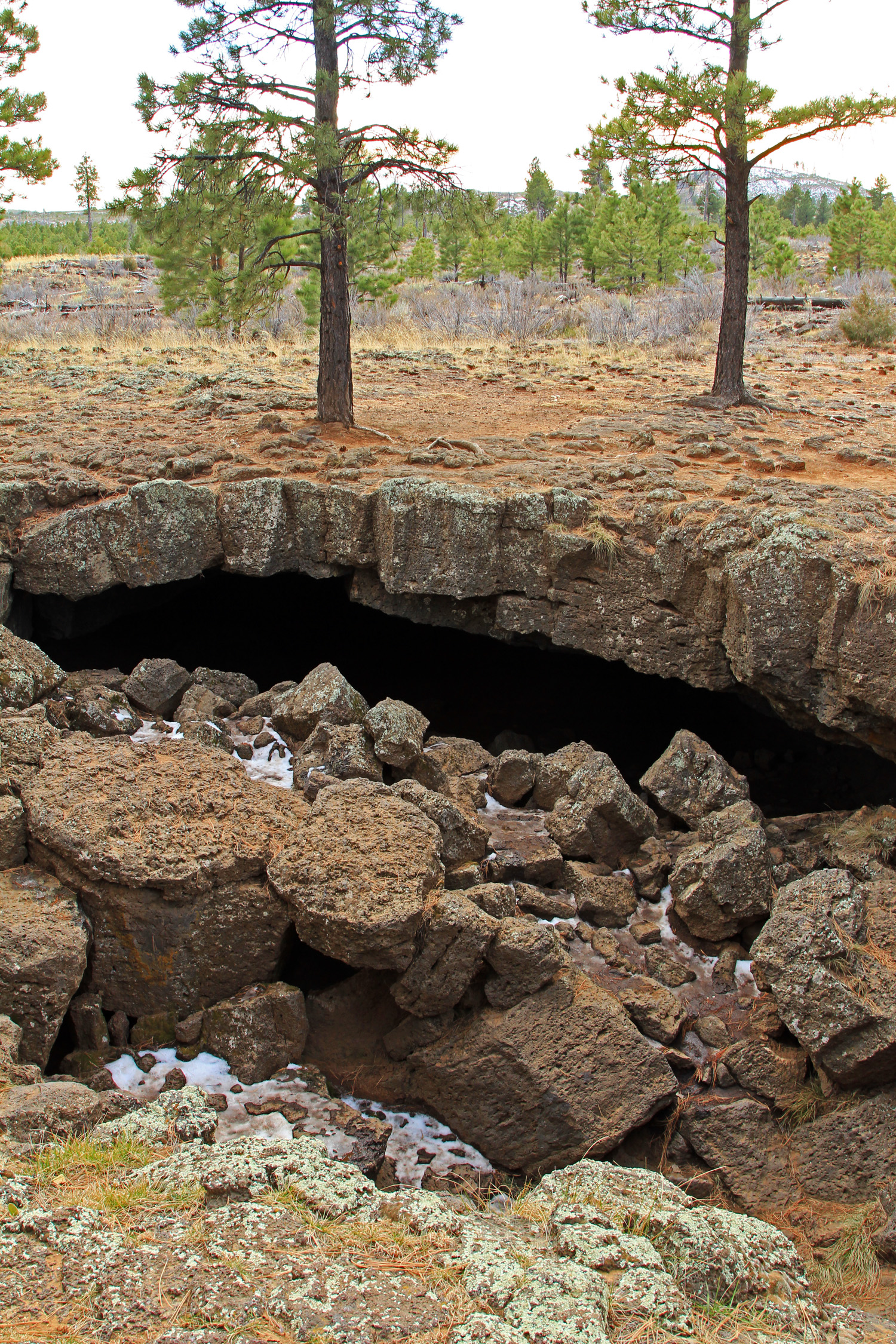
Main entrance

Mammoth Cave is a lava tube located on the Markagunt Plateau in the Dixie National Forest of Southern Utah, and is one of the largest lava tubes in Utah. The cave has over 2,200 feet (670 m) of passage and is about a quarter mile (400 m) long. It was formed by cooling lava and water less than 2,000 years ago. Due to moisture and its elevation of 8,050 feet (2,450 m) above sea level the cave stays cool year round.

The cave has four chambers, the largest to the west. At the end of the largest tunnel, it narrows to a small opening that can be used as an exit. Although the cave is open year round, portions of it are closed off from October until April to protect hibernating bats. Additionally, Mammoth Creek Road may be completely impassable during the winter months due to snowfall.

== Sources ==
- US Forest Service
- Cedar City Brian Head Tourist Bureau
