= Navajo Lake (Utah) =

Lake in the state of Utah, United States

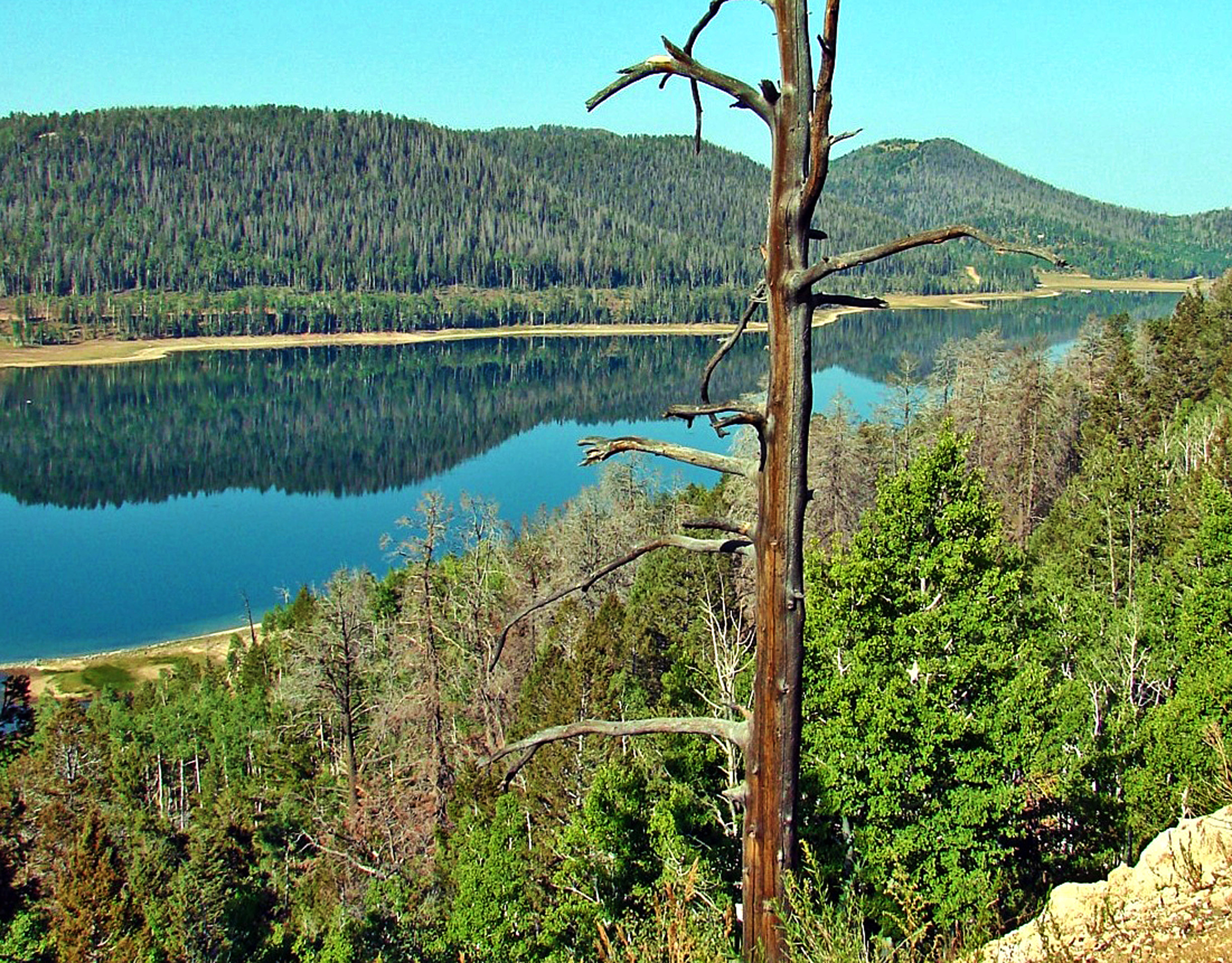
- Looking southwest at Navajo Lake from SR-14, October 2014

- Location within Utah Location within the United States
- Location: Dixie National Forest, Kane County, Utah, United States
- Coordinates: 37°31′30″N 112°46′03″W
- Type: Reservoir
- Part of: Both the Colorado River Basin and the Great Basin
- Primary inflows: Springs
- Primary outflows: Seepage
- Basin countries: United States
- Max. length: 3 miles (4.8 km)
- Max. width: 0.5 miles (0.80 km)
- Max. depth: 25 feet (7.6 m)
- Surface elevation: 9,035 feet (2,754 m)

Navajo Lake is a small reservoir in northwestern Kane County in southern Utah, United States. It is shallow, reaching depths of only 25 feet (7.6 m). Recreation includes fishing, boating, swimming, and lodging facilities. Species of trout in Navajo Lake are brook trout, splake trout (hybrid), and rainbow trout. Trout survival for winter is very poor with only the splake and brook trout overwintering. There is also a dense population of Utah chub. The lake was formed by a lava flow across the eastern end of the valley. The lake drains into both the Great Basin and the Colorado River drainage systems through sinkholes in the lake floor.

== See also ==
- List of dams and reservoirs in Utah
