= Manitoba Liberal Party candidates in the 2003 Manitoba provincial election =

The Manitoba Liberal Party fielded a full slate of 57 candidates in the 2003 provincial election, and won two seats to remain as the third-largest party in the legislature. Some of the party's candidates have their own biography pages; information on others may be found here.

This page also provides information for candidates in by-elections between 2003 and 2007.

== Candidates ==
Riding	Candidate's Name	Notes	Residence	Occupation	Votes	%	Rank
Arthur-Virden	Vaughn Ramsay				331	4.31	3rd
Assiniboia	Monique Graboski				657	8.05	3rd
Brandon East	Scott Brigden				274	4.39	3rd
Brandon West	Candace Sigurdson				346	4.05	3rd
Burrows	Tony Sanchez				1,252	21.58	2nd
Carman	Don Oldcorn				1,825	26.87	2nd
Charleswood	Rick Ross				2,800	34.46	2nd
Concordia	Tanya Parks				419	7.22	3rd
Dauphin-Roblin	Joelle Robinson				683	8.05	3rd
Elmwood	Walt Roberts				748	12.47	3rd
Emerson	Len Schieman				1,260	21.12	2nd
Flin Flon	Garry Zamzow				557	16.98	2nd
Fort Garry	Taran Malik				562	6.82	3rd
Fort Rouge	David Henteleff				1,212	16.96	3rd
Fort Whyte	Gerry Sankar				1,803	19.16	3rd
Gimli	Lynn Clark				574	5.90	3rd
Inkster	Kevin Lamoureux				3,671	53.39	1st
Interlake	Leslie Jacobson				397	6.56	3rd
Kildonan	Michael Lazar				942	12.90	3rd
Kirkfield Park	Brian Head				2,042	22.22	3rd
La Verendrye	Paula Ryplanski Marsch				492	7.36	3rd
Lac du Bonnet	Cheryl Appleyard				290	3.39	3rd
Lakeside	Louis Allain				636	8.19	3rd
Lord Roberts	Ali Lamont				982	13.92	3rd
The Maples	Angelina Olivier-Job				885	15.94	2nd
Minnedosa	Gordon Powell				268	3.90	3rd
Minto	Mario Javier				685	13.27	2nd
Morris	Michael van Walleghem				1,407	20.13	3rd
The Pas	Mark Sweeny				836	17.67	2nd
Pembina	Marilyn Skubovious				505	8.20	3rd
Point Douglas	Mary Lou Bourgeois				547	14.23	2nd
Portage la Prairie	Mike Lefebvre				527	7.45	3rd
Radisson	Murray Cliff				624	8.42	3rd
Riel	Kristopher Ade				671	8.14	3rd
River East	Fred Curry				286	2.97	3rd
River Heights	Jon Gerrard	Party leader			4,500	48.70	1st
Rossmere	Sam Bhalesar				362	4.69	3rd
Rupertsland	Orville Woodford				162	6.44	2nd
Russell	Joan Clement				571	7.26	3rd
St. Boniface	Dougald Lamont				952	14.43	2nd
St. James	Alana McKenzie				963	12.98	3rd
St. Johns	Ed Kolodziej				745	12.77	2nd
St. Norbert	Jocelyn Greenwood				741	10.75	3rd
St. Vital	Justin Beaudry				707	10.17	3rd
Ste. Rose	Wendy Menzies				538	8.22	3rd
Seine River	Luciano Vacca				553	6.55	3rd
Selkirk	Jack Jonasson				1,469	20.11	2nd
Southdale	Chuck Mrena				1,120	12.93	3rd
Springfield	Vince Boileau				682	8.41	3rd
Steinbach	Monica Guetre				455	7.93	3rd
Swan River	Russell McKay				538	7.21	3rd
Thompson	Myrle Traverse				155	3.90	3rd
Transcona	Betty Ann Watts				1,024	16.12	2nd
Turtle Mountain	Bev Leadbeater				743	11.27	3rd
Tuxedo	Marla Billinghurst				1,741	21.83	3rd
Wellington	Rylan Reed				640	15.18	2nd
Wolseley	Val Mollison				766	12.52	3rd

== Byelections ==
Riding	By-election Date	Candidate's Name	Votes	%	Rank
Minto	June 22, 2004	Wayne Helgason	1,616	31.03	2nd
Turtle Mountain	July 2, 2004	Bev Leadbeater	1,084	18.81	2nd
Fort Whyte	December 13, 2005	Jean Paterson	1,466	21.63	3rd
