= Monument Mountain (Berkshire County, Massachusetts) =

Ridgeline in Great Barrington and Stockbridge, Massachusetts

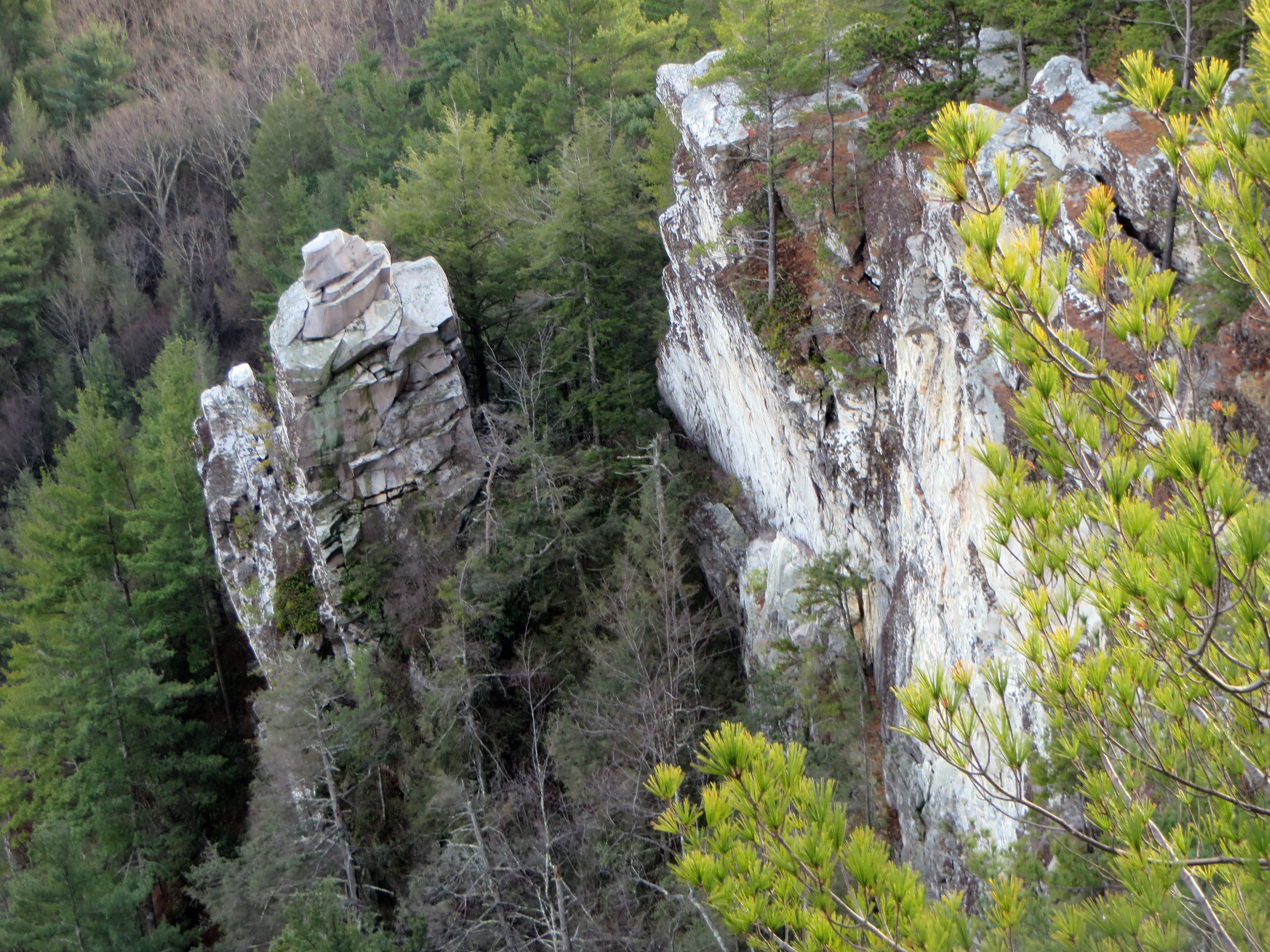
- Devil's Pulpit, Monument Mountain

Highest point
- Elevation: 1,739 ft (530 m)
- Coordinates: 42°15′29″N 73°21′00″W

Geography
- Location: Berkshire County, Massachusetts
- Parent range: The Berkshires

Geology
- Mountain type: quartzite

Monument Mountain is a 2.5-mile (4.0 km) long quartzite ridgeline located in Great Barrington and Stockbridge, Massachusetts in the Berkshires geology. Beside the high point, 1,739 feet (530 m), the mountain has several distinct features, most notably the open, knife-edge Peeskawso Peak, 1,642 feet (500 m) located on the southeast side of the mountain within the 503-acre (204 ha) Monument Mountain reservation managed by The Trustees of Reservations. The mountain receives over 20,000 visitors per year.

Devil's Pulpit, part of Peeskawso Peak, is a free-standing pillar of stone. Flag Rock, located on the southwest side of the mountain, is an open ledge overlooking the village of Housatonic. The only official trails on the mountain ascend Peeskawso Peak from a parking lot on Massachusetts Route 7 north of Great Barrington center. There is no fee for members of The Trustees and a parking fee of $6 for non-members. An unnamed waterfall is located to the northeast of Peeskawso Peak along the Hickey Trail.

Views from Peeskawso Peak include the Housatonic River Valley, The Berkshires, the Taconic Mountains, and the Catskill Mountains of New York.

The west side of Monument Mountain drains into the Housatonic River thence into Long Island Sound. The east side of Monument Mountain drains into Konkapot Brook thence into the Housatonic River.

In August 1850, Herman Melville, Nathaniel Hawthorne and Oliver Wendell Holmes Sr. climbed Monument Mountain together.
