= Utah State Route 148 =

State highway in the Dixie National Forest in Iron County, Utah, United States

State Route 148
- Cedar Breaks Scenic Byway
- SR-148 highlighted in red

Route information
- Maintained by UDOT
- Length: 2.544 mi (4.094 km)
- Existed: 1985–present
- Restrictions: Closed in winter from mile 0.2 to 19

Major junctions
- South end: SR-14 in Iron County
- North end: Cedar Breaks National Monument boundary

Location
- Country: United States
- State: Utah

Highway system
- Utah State Highway System; Interstate; US; State; Minor; Scenic
← SR-147	→ SR-149

State Route 148 (SR-148) is a state highway in the U.S. state of Utah. The entire highway has been designated the Cedar Breaks Scenic Byway as part of the Utah Scenic Byways and National Forest Scenic Byway programs.

== Route description ==
The route starts at its intersection with State Route 14 in Cedar Canyon. From here it travels north approximately 2.5 miles (4.0 km) north to its terminus at the south boundary of Cedar Breaks National Monument. While the route ends here, continuing north along the road into the park leads to Utah's Patchwork Parkway/Brian Head-Lake Panguitch Scenic Byway (SR-143).

== History ==
State Route 55 was designated by the Utah State Legislature in 1927, connecting SR-14 at Cedar Breaks Junction with the southern boundary of Cedar Breaks National Monument. However, as part of a major realignment of state highways, SR-55 was deleted in 1969, and the route was designated as part of SR-143. This left SR-143 as a non-contiguous highway, as the portion going through the national monument was not part of the highway designation.

In 1985, the southern portion of SR-143 between SR-14 and the southern Cedar Breaks National Monument boundary was re-designated State Route 148, with no further changes to this highway. The route was designated as a Utah Scenic Byway as the Cedar Breaks Scenic Byway, with a National Forest Scenic Byway designation following on February 6, 1991.

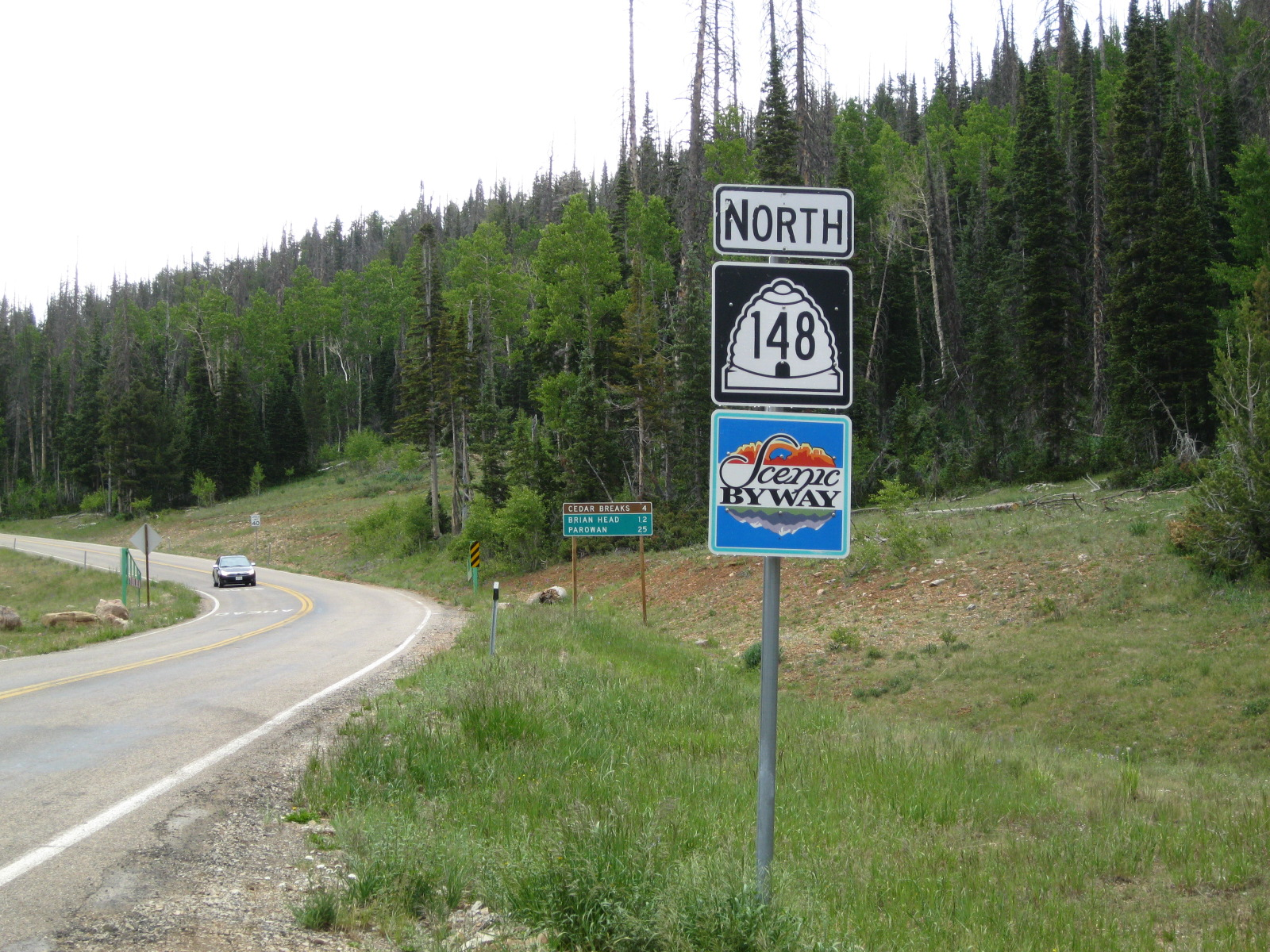
Utah State Route 148

== Major intersections ==
The entire route is in rural Iron County.

mi	km	Destinations	Notes
0.000	0.000	SR-14	Southern terminus
2.544	4.094	South boundary of Cedar Breaks National Monument	Northern terminus
1.000 mi = 1.609 km; 1.000 km = 0.621 mi
