= Monument Mountain (reservation) =

Public park in Massachusetts, United States

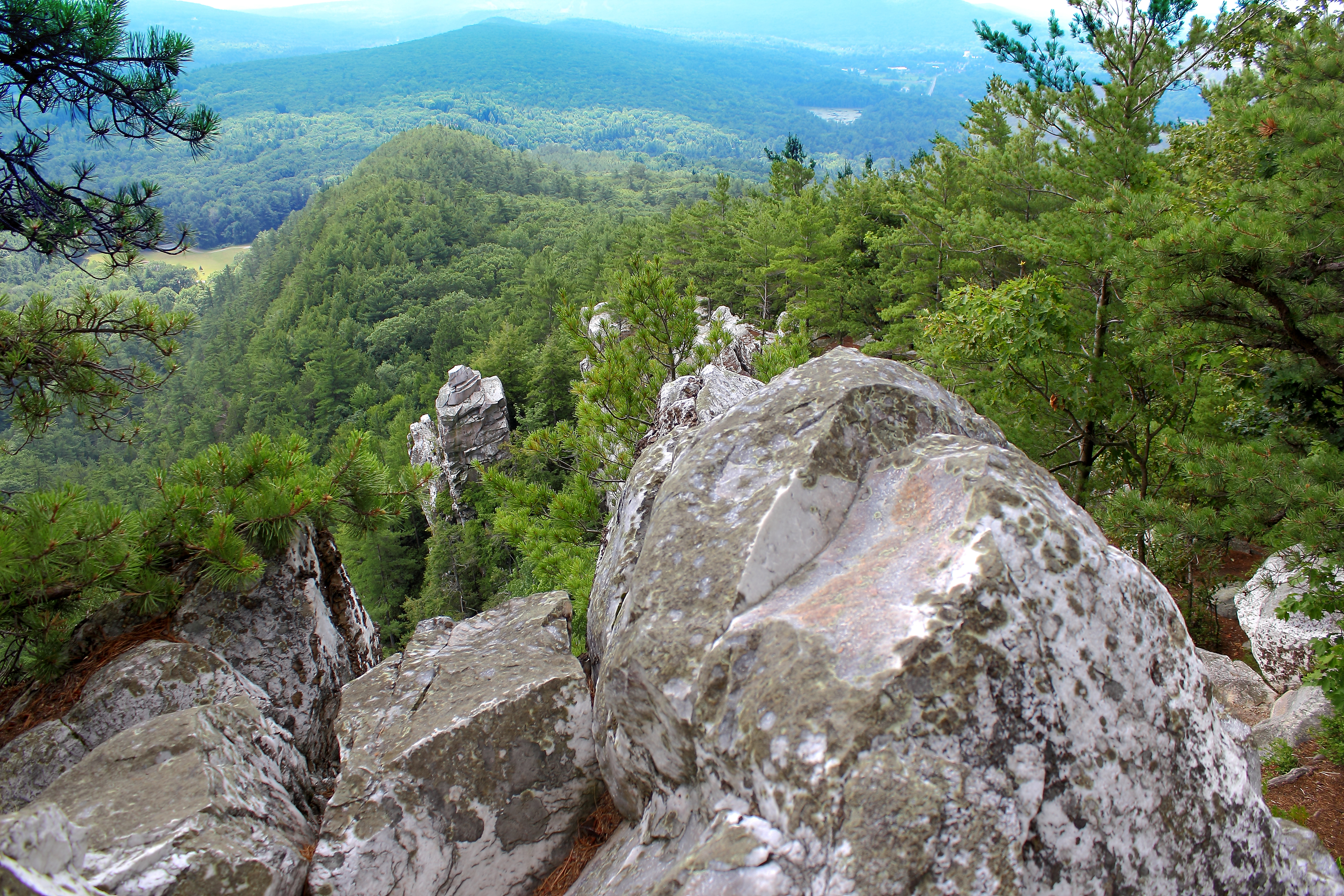
- View looking South East from the Devils Pulpit on Monument Mountain near Great Barrington, MA.
- Interactive map of Monument Mountain
- Location: Massachusetts, United States
- Coordinates: 42°14′50.4″N 73°20′26.6″W
- Elevation: 500.5 m (1,642 ft)
- Established: 1899
- Operator: The Trustees of Reservations
- Website: Monument Mountain

Monument Mountain is the name of a popular 503-acre (204 ha) open space reservation located in Great Barrington, Massachusetts on the southeast side of Monument Mountain. The reservation is centered on the 1,642 feet (500 m) subordinate summit of Peeskawso Peak. It is managed by The Trustees of Reservations, a non-profit conservation organization and is notable for its expansive views of the Housatonic River Valley, the Berkshires, the Taconic Mountains, and the Catskill Mountains of New York from the knife-edge summit of Peeskawso Peak. Monument Mountain, composed of erosion resistant quartzite, is of The Berkshires geology. The reservation receives more than 20,000 visitors a year. The mountain was logged for charcoal to fuel a furnace in Vandusenville at the corner of Division Street and Route 41 in Great Barrington. Remnants of the furnace can be seen if one stands on the Route 41 bridge and looks upstream on the Williams River.

== History ==
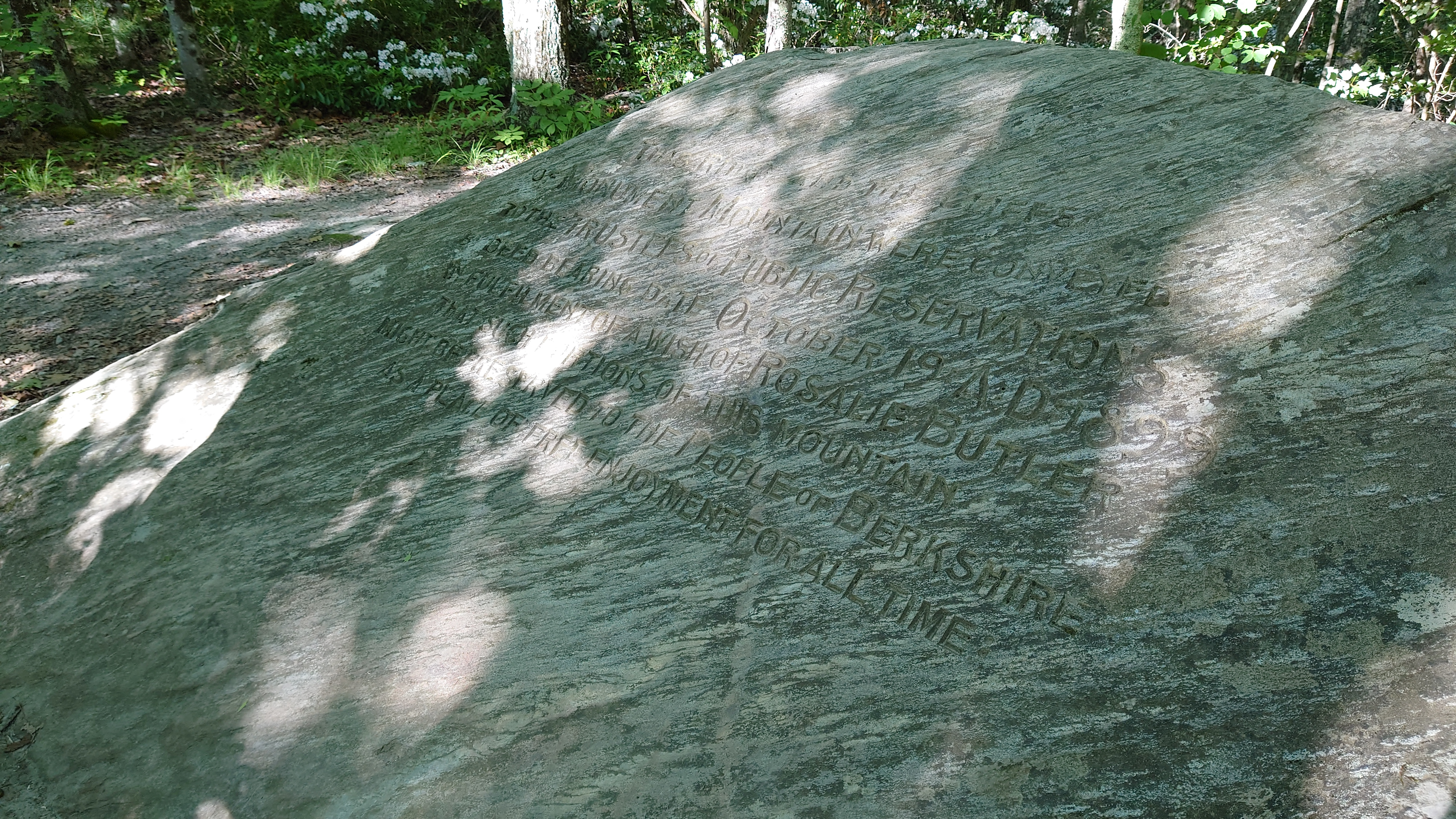
Inscription Rock, a landmark located within Monument Mountain. The inscription reads: "This ridge and the cliffs of Monument Mountain were conveyed to the Trustees of Public Reservations by deed bearing date October 19 AD 1899 by fulfillment of a wish of Rosalie Butler that such portions of this mountain might be preserved to the People of Berkshire as a place of free enjoyment for all time" (sic)

Monument Mountain was a sacred place to the ancestors of the Mohican people dating back before written history. They left stone prayers atop a monument that gives the mountain its name. These stones have all been removed or have decayed following the expulsion of the Mohicans to their current-day reservation in Wisconsin.

It has been the subject of art and literature since as early as 1815 when the poet William Cullen Bryant penned "Monument Mountain," an account of the story of a Mohican woman who allegedly leapt from what is now called Peeskawso Peak. In 1850, Nathaniel Hawthorne and Herman Melville picnicked on the mountain; a thunderstorm forced them to seek cover in a boulder cave where they engaged in a lengthy discussion that inspired some of Melville's ideas for his novel Moby Dick.

In the 1930s, red pines were planted on the reservation; by that time much of the mountain had been heavily logged for the charcoal industry in support of iron foundries in Falls Village, Connecticut and Lenox, Massachusetts.

The reservation was acquired as the gift of Helen C. Butler in 1899 and John Butler Swann in 1980. Additional parcels were purchased in 1985 and 1986.

In 2021, the Trustees renamed the summit and two trails after collaboration with the Stockbridge-Munsee Community Band of Mohicans. Indian Monument Trail was renamed the Mohican Monument Trail, Squaw Peak Trail was renamed the Peeskawso Peak Trail, and Squaw Peak, a summit of Monument Mountain, was renamed Peeskawso Peak.

== Recreation ==
A trailhead parking lot is located on Massachusetts Route 7 north of Great Barrington center. Parking is free for Trustees of Reservations members and $6 per car for the general public. The trail system consists of the Hickey and Mohican Monument Trails (which form a loop around Peeskawso Peak) and the Peeskawso Peak Trail, which ascends the knife-edge summit between the other two trails. The trail to the summit includes some rock scrambling and has been the scene of a few accidents and falls. An unnamed waterfall is located along the Hickey Trail. The Devil's Pulpit, part of Peeskawso Peak, is a free-standing pillar of stone visible from the Peeskawso Peak Trail.

The reservation is open to hiking, picnicking, and hunting (in season).

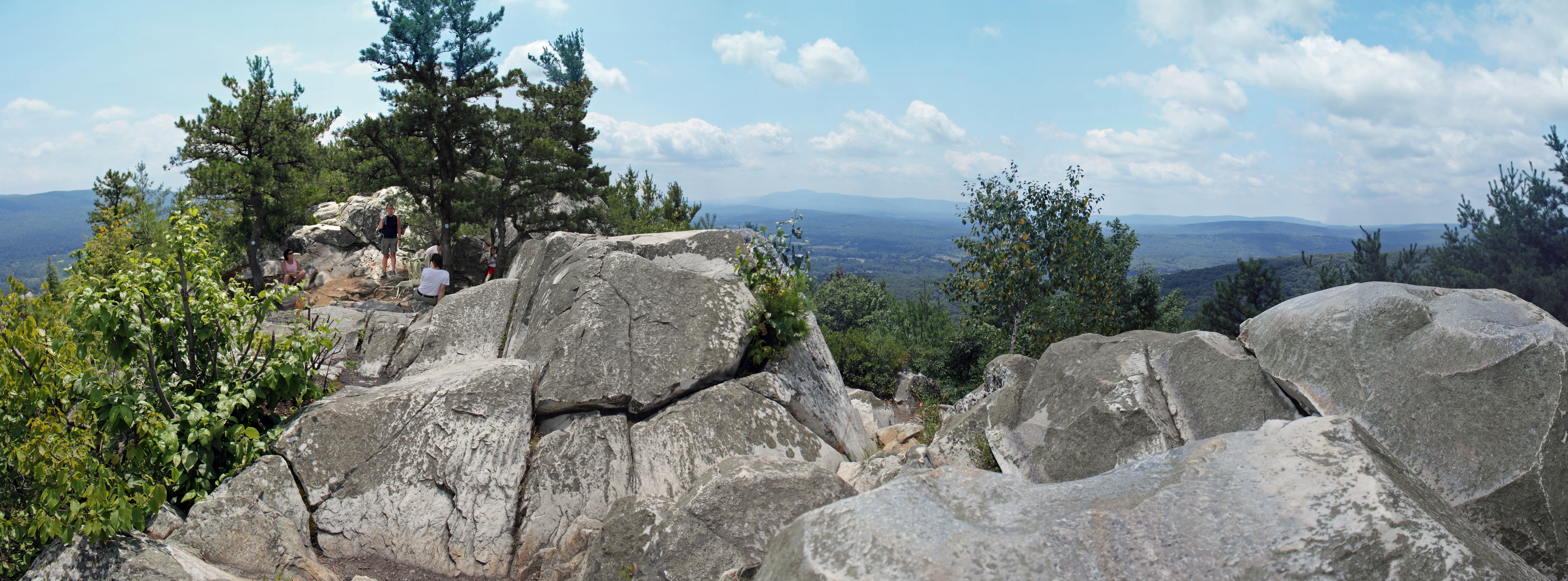
Peeskawso Peak on Monument Mountain located in Great Barrington, Massachusetts
