= Monument Peak (Nevada) =

Mountain in Clark County, Nevada, United States

Coordinates: 41°00′34″N 115°53′13″W

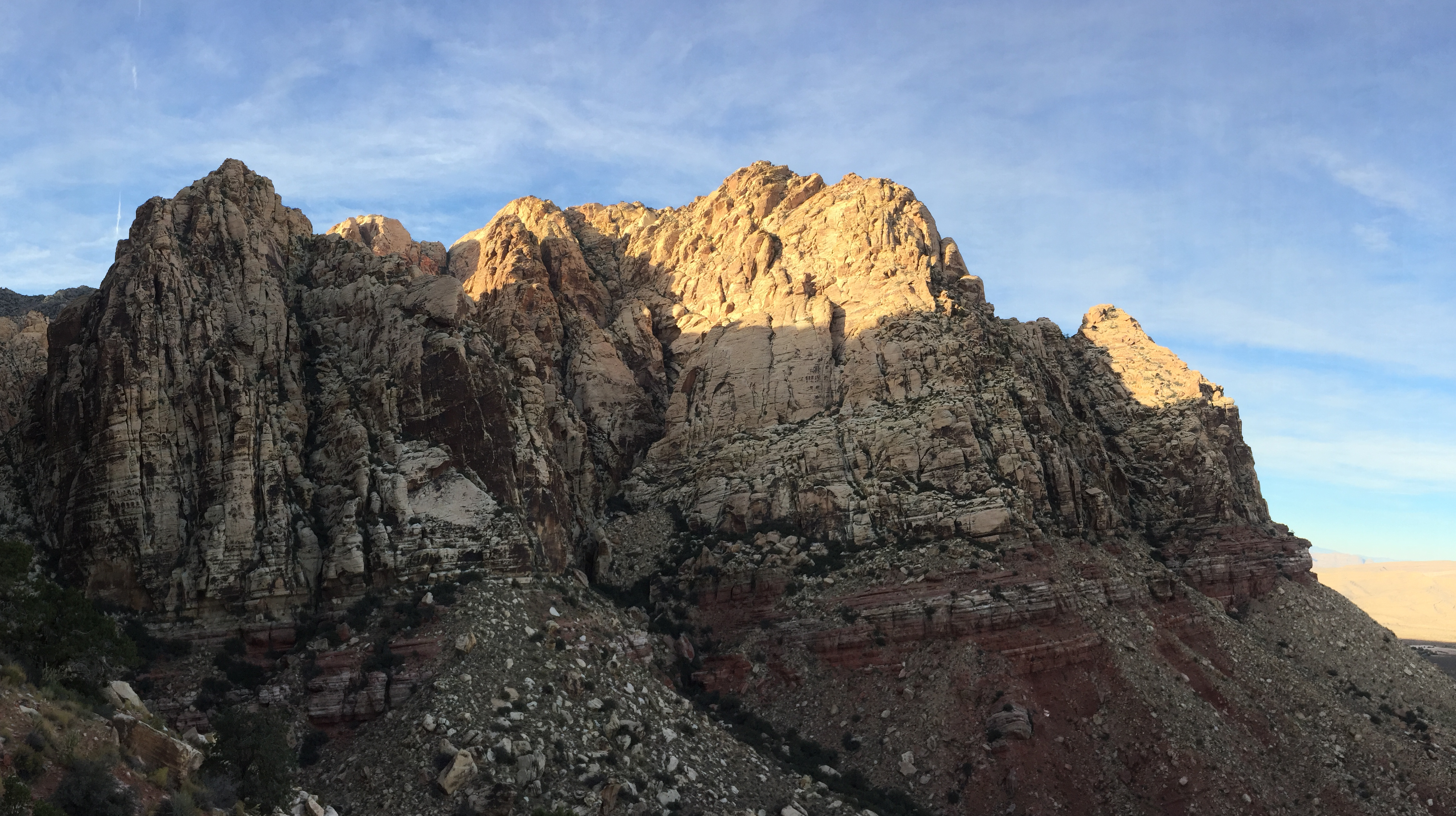
Monument Peak as seen from bottom of the Frogland Buttress in the Whisky Peak, Black Velvet Canyon, Red Rock Canyon National Conservation Area.

Monument Peak is a summit in the U.S. state of Nevada. The elevation is 6,283 feet (1,915 m).

Monument Peak was named for the "monuments", i.e. stone prospectors' markers near it.
