= Brian Head (mountain) =

Mountain in the American state of Utah

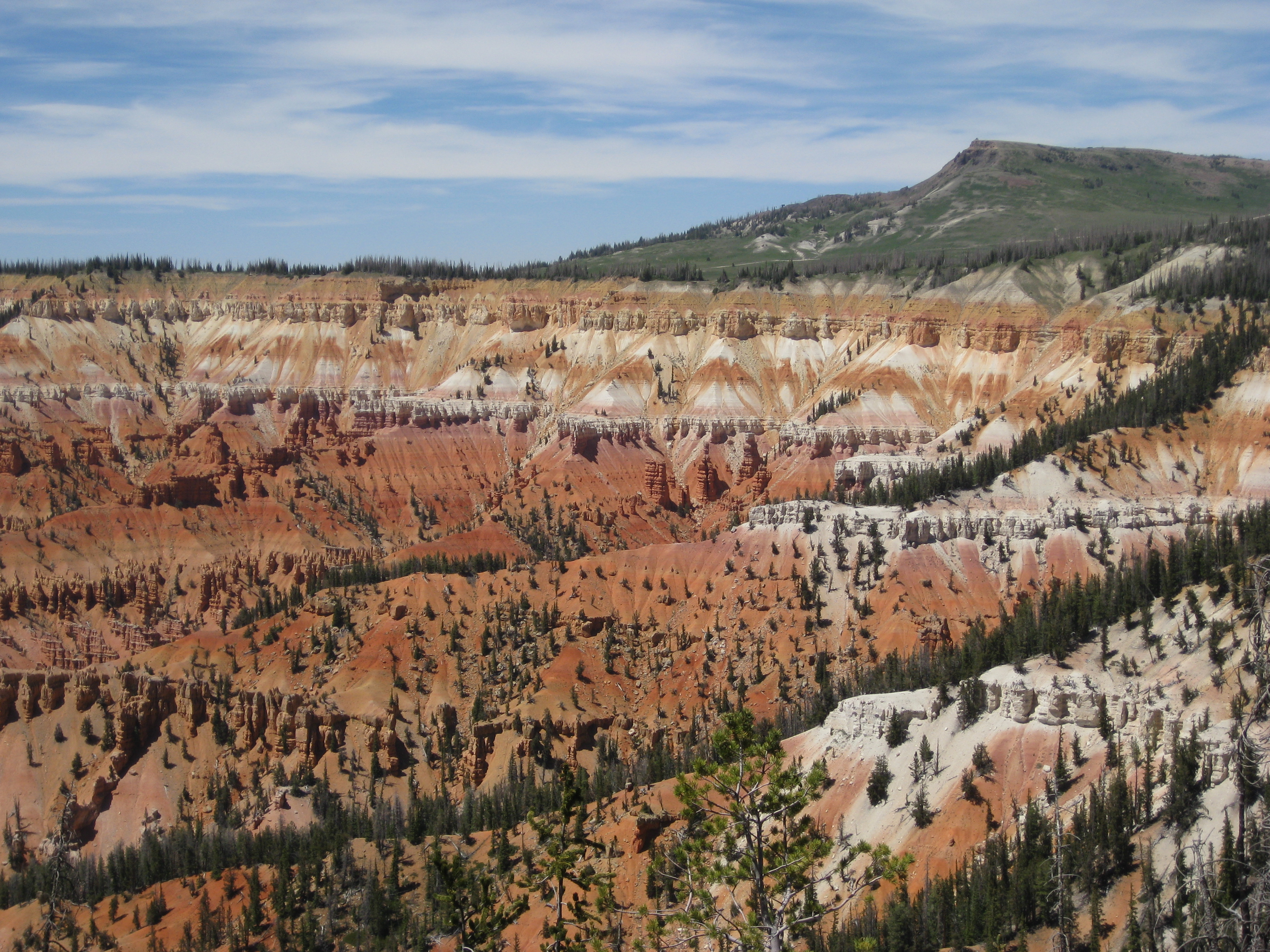
- Brian Head Peak and Cedar Breaks

Highest point
- Elevation: 11,312 ft (3,448 m) NAVD 88
- Prominence: 3,747 ft (1,142 m)
- Listing: Utah county high points 15th
- Coordinates: 37°40′52″N 112°49′52″W

Geography
- Location within Utah
- Location: Iron County, Utah, U.S.
- Parent range: Markagunt Plateau
- Topo map: USGS Brian Head

Brian Head, at 11,312 feet (3,448 m) high, is the highest peak on the Markagunt Plateau and in Iron County in southwestern Utah, United States. Brian Head Peak is located east of Cedar City and just north of Cedar Breaks National Monument in Dixie National Forest. The town of Brian Head at the western base of the mountain is the location of the Brian Head Ski Resort.

Brian Head has the name of a government surveyor. There is a Forest Service lookout on the peak that was built in 1934–1935, and there is also a road to the summit that can be driven in summer.

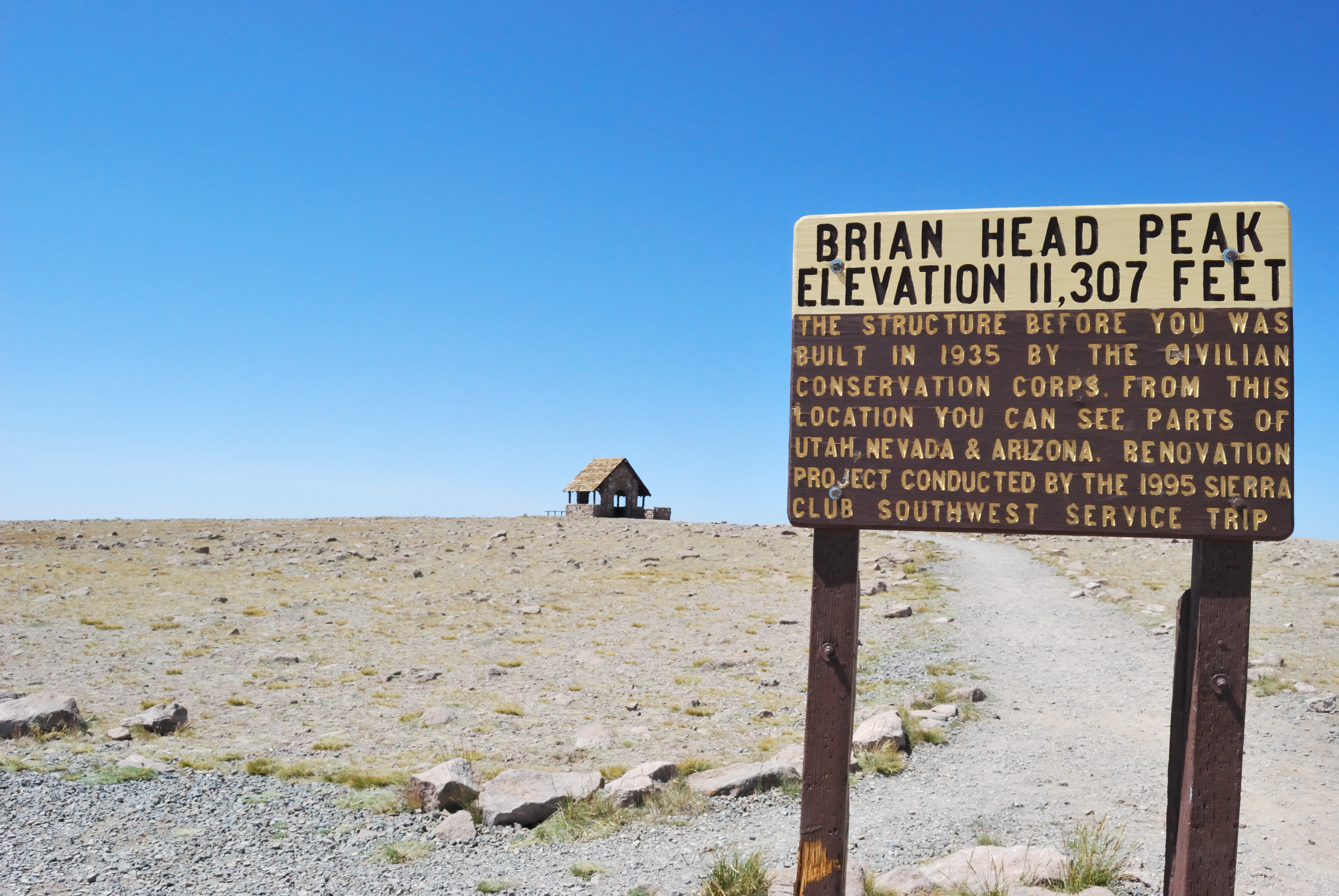
Summit

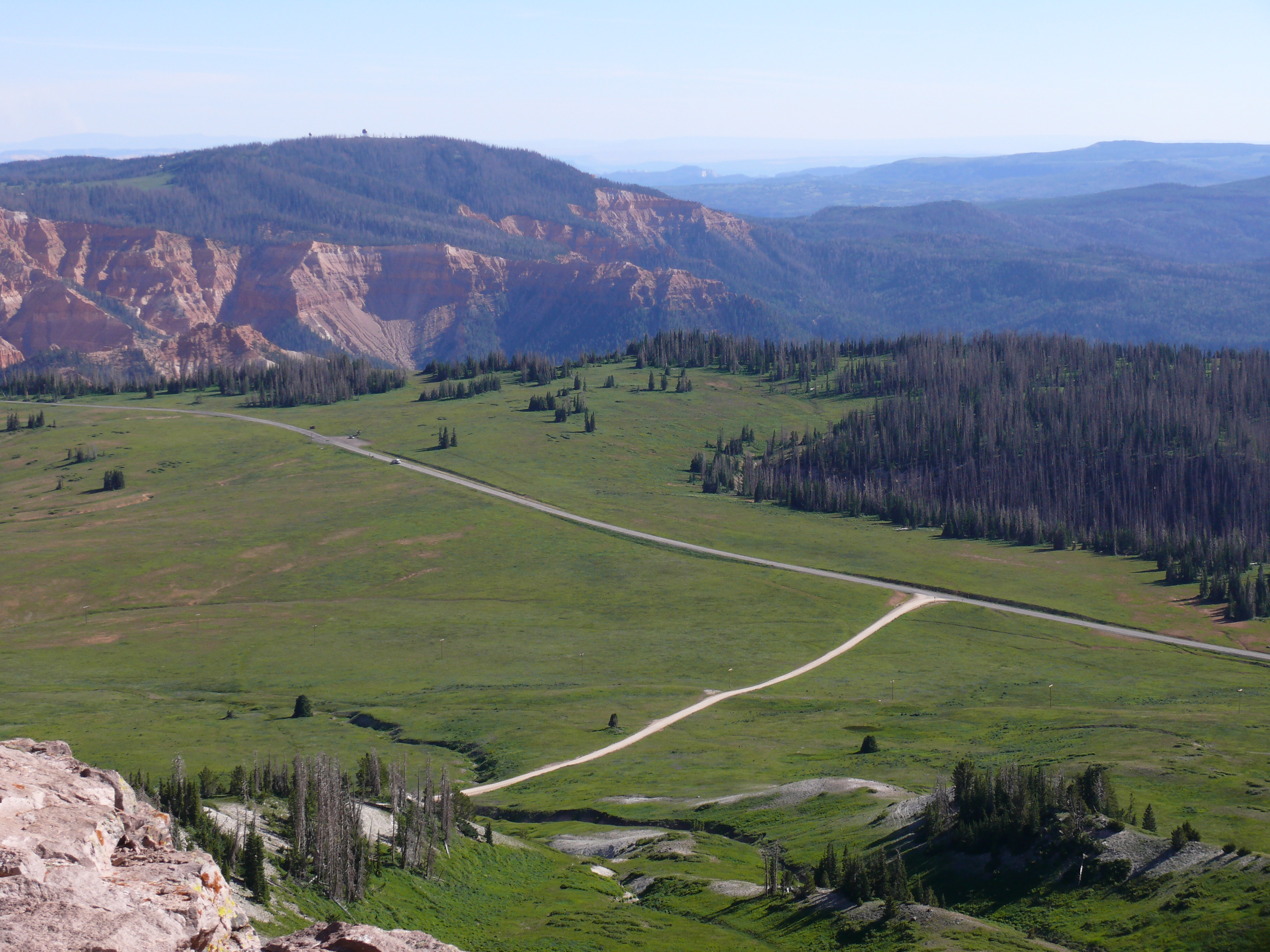
View from the summit

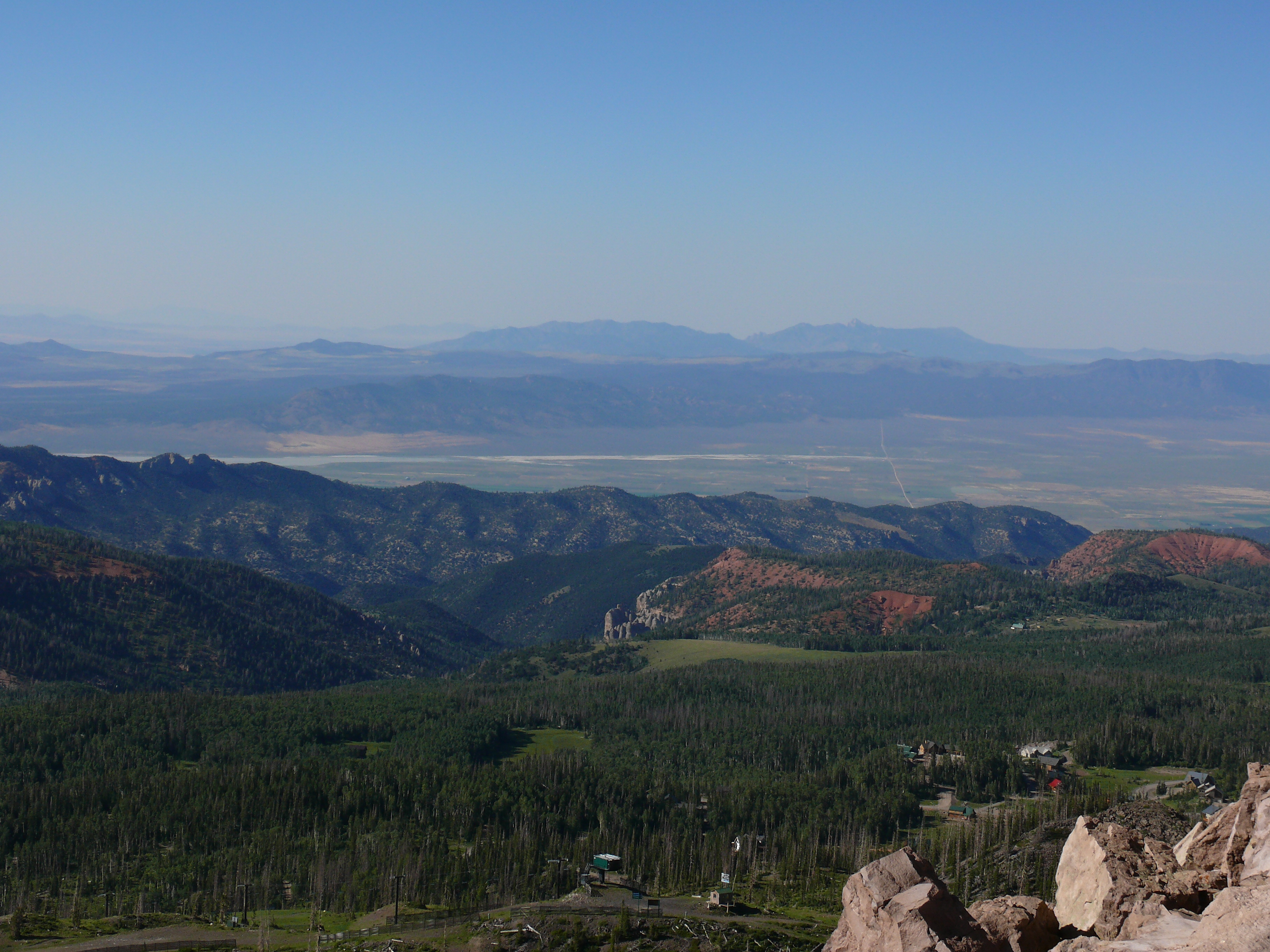
View west from the summit

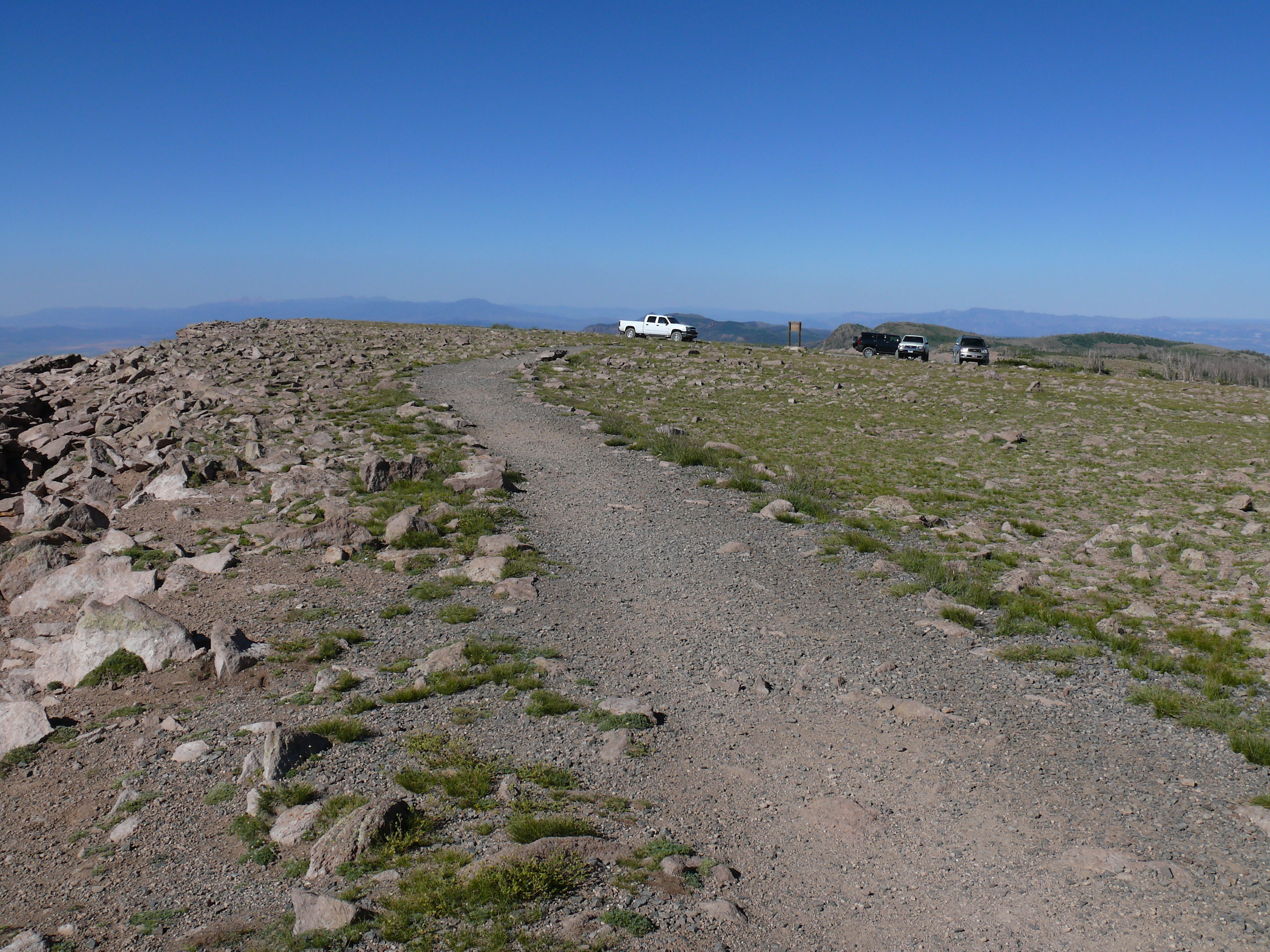
Trail on the summit

== See also ==
- List of mountains in Utah
