= Equity carve-out =

Type of corporate reorganization

Equity carve-out (ECO), also known as a split-off IPO or a partial spin-off, is a type of corporate reorganization, in which a company creates a new subsidiary and subsequently IPOs it, while retaining management control. Only part of the shares are offered to the public, so the parent company retains an equity stake in the subsidiary. Typically, up to 20% of subsidiary shares is offered to the public.

== Entities ==
The transaction creates two separate legal entities, the parent and the daughter company, each with its own board, management team, CEO, and financials. Equity carve-outs increase the access to capital markets, giving the carved-out subsidiary strong growth opportunities, while avoiding the negative signaling associated with a seasoned offering (SEO) of the parent equity.

== Advantages ==
If the parent company wants to fully divest the subsidiary, then an equity carve-out allows a prior evaluation of the subsidiary's market value and creates a credible transaction history.

In equity carve-out, the firm sells shares of the divested subsidiary to the public and retains a portion, which is often significant and represents controlling ownership of the subsidiary.

== Challenges ==
Challenging accounting issues can arise when acquiring carve-outs. Carve-out entities need a clear understanding of what their new stand-alone status means in terms of numerous accounting concepts and they must establish accounting policies in line with their operations.

== See also ==
- Tracking stock
