= Brian Head Ski Resort =

Ski resort in Utah, United States

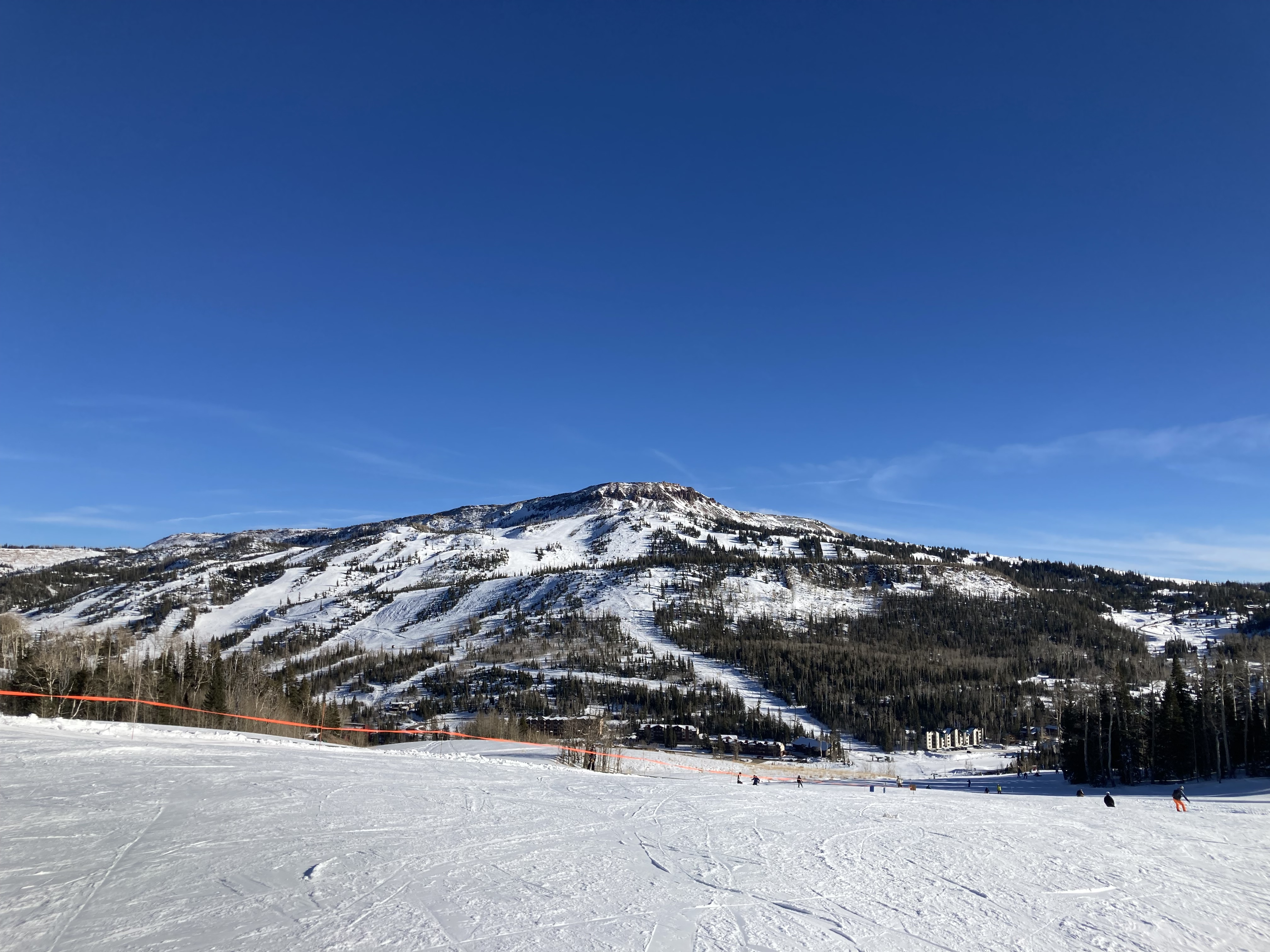
- Brian Head Peak from Navajo Peak in 2023

- Location in Utah Brian Head Ski Resort (the United States)
- Location: Brian Head, Utah
- Coordinates: 37°41′N 112°50′W
- Owner: Mountain Capital Partners
- Vertical: 1,707 ft (520 m)
- Top elevation: 10,920 ft (3,330 m)
- Base elevation: 9,600 ft (2,900 m)
- Skiable area: 665 acres (269 ha)
- Trails: 71; 35% beginner 35% intermediate 20% advanced 10% expert
- Snowfall: 360 in (910 cm) per year
- Website: brianhead.com

Brian Head Ski Resort is a ski destination for Southern Utah and the southern California, Arizona, and Las Vegas areas. Located 3.5 hours north east of Las Vegas and four hours south of Salt Lake City, it is Utah's southernmost ski resort. Brian Head Resort was established in 1964, and once operated as a one-chairlift resort. Currently, the resort has 8 chairlifts, 72 runs, and over 650 skiable acres. It also features a bridge between its two skiable mountains, Navajo Peak and Brian Head.

Mountain Capital Partners acquired Brian Head in 2019.

== Statistics ==
- Base elevation: 9,600 ft (2926 m)
- Summit elevation: 11,307 ft (3446 m)
- Vertical rise: 1,707 ft (520 m)
- Total mountain peaks: 2
- Total skiable area: 660 acres (2.2 km^{2})
- Lifts: (8 total)
  - 2 High Speed Quad chairs, 5 Triple chairs, 1 double chair, and 2 surface lifts.
- Terrain:
  - Beginner: 35%
  - Intermediate: 35%
  - Advanced 20%
  - Expert: 10%
- Winter season: mid-November through mid-April.

== Lifts and Additional Information ==
There are 8 chairs at the resort. Chair 6 is the only double. Chairs 1, 3, 5, 7-8 are all triples. Chairs 2 and 4 are high speed quads. Lift names are as follows: 1: Wildflower 2: Giant Steps Express 3: Blackfoot 4: Navajo Express 5: Roulette 6: Pioneer 7: The Dunes 8: Alpen Glow

The lifts 1, 4, and 6 are located on the Navajo Peak mountain and lifts 2, 3, 5, 7, and 8 are on the Brian Head Peak mountain. The ski bridge that connects the resorts goes over Utah Highway UT-143 with lift number 1 located just to the east of the bridge. The lift starts near the base of the Brian Head Peak side and goes to the top of the Navajo Peak side.

=== Navajo Peak ===
The Navajo Peak side provides more beginner and intermediate terrain. The number 6 lift provides the easiest terrain on the mountain. There are also two surface lifts just below lift number 6 designed specifically for beginners. This mountain has one advanced (black diamond) run.

=== Brian Head Peak ===
The Brian Head Peak side provides a good balance of intermediate terrain and advanced terrain with some beginner runs near the base. There are advanced runs throughout this side with most advanced near the number 5, 7, and 8 lifts. Number 2 lift is one of two high speed quad lifts at the resort and takes you to the chair lift summit of 10,900 feet.
