= Brian Head, Utah =

- Town
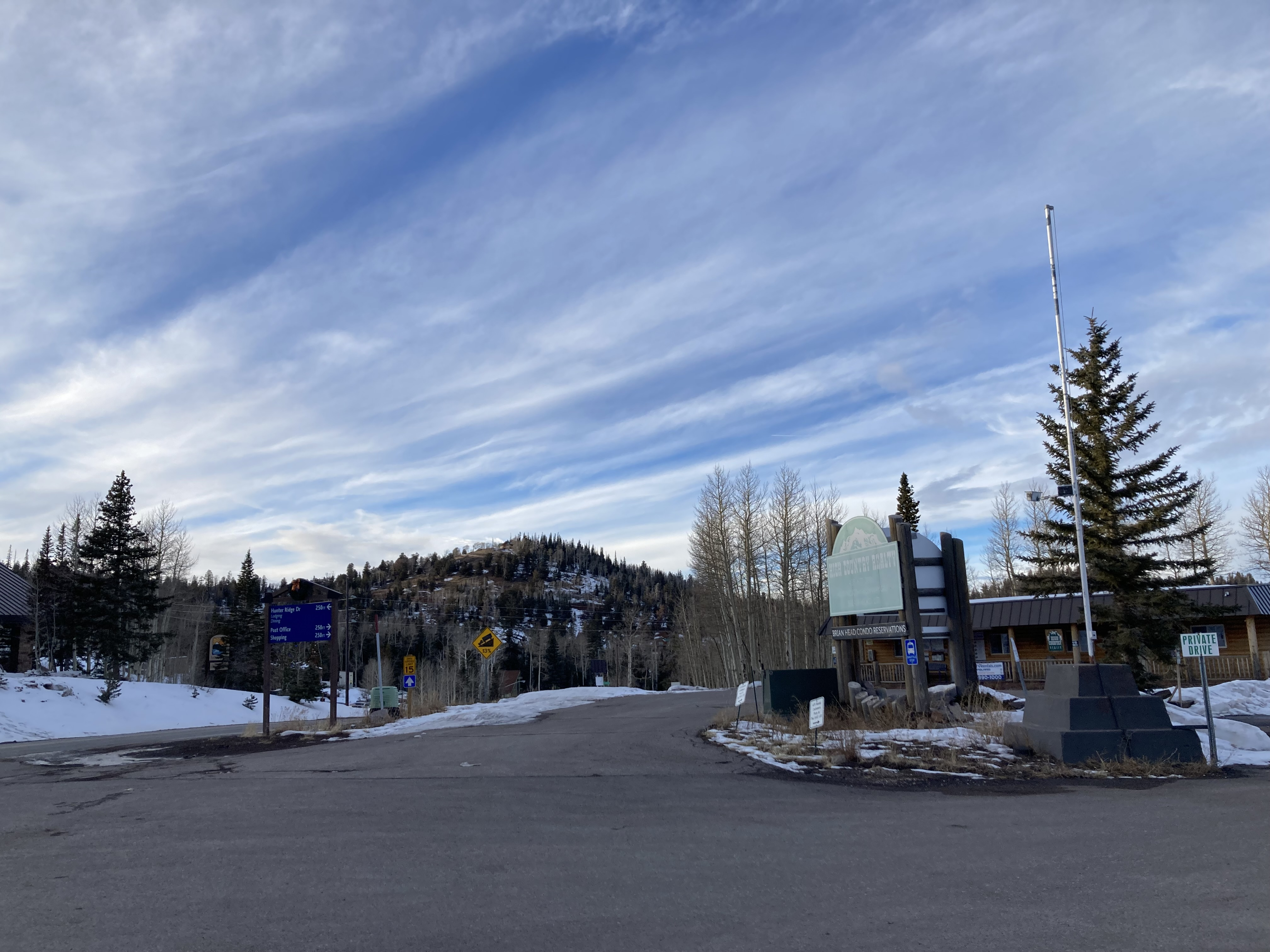

- Location in Iron County and the state of Utah.
- Coordinates: 37°41′52″N 112°50′30″W
- Country: United States
- State: Utah
- County: Iron
- Incorporated: March 1975
- Named after: Brian Head

Area
  - Total: 3.64 sq mi (9.44 km^{2})
  - Land: 3.64 sq mi (9.44 km^{2})
  - Water: 0 sq mi (0.00 km^{2})
- Elevation: 9,771 ft (2,978 m)

Population (2020)
  - Total: 151
  - Density: 25.5/sq mi (9.85/km^{2})
- Time zone: UTC-7 (MST)
  - Summer (DST): UTC-6 (MDT)
- ZIP code: 84719
- Area code: 435
- FIPS code: 49-08020
- GNIS feature ID: 2411724

Brian Head is a town in Iron County, Utah, United States. The population was 151 at the 2020 census, a significant increase from the 2010 figure of 83.

Brian Head is also the location of the Brian Head Ski Resort.

== History ==
The community was originally called "Monument Peak," but was changed to the current name after 1900 for reasons no longer known, although probably related to the name of (or renaming to) Brian Head (mountain), in nearby Dixie National Forest.

In 1964, the Brian Head Resort opened. Development of the Aspen Meadows area is currently projected to double the size of the town.

== Geography ==
According to the United States Census Bureau, the town has a total area of 3.1 square miles (8.0 km^{2}), all land.

The community, at an elevation of 9,800 feet (3,000 m) above sea level, is the highest town in Utah. It is located on State Route 143 and is east of Interstate 15. Brian Head is approximately three miles north of Cedar Breaks National Monument.

== Demographics ==
Historical population
Census	Pop.	Note	%±
1980	77		—
1990	109		41.6%
2000	118		8.3%
2010	83		−29.7%
2020	151		81.9%
U.S. Decennial Census

As of the census of 2000, there were 118 people, 55 households, and 33 families residing in the town. The population density was 38.1 people per square mile (14.7/km^{2}). There were 912 housing units at an average density of 294.1 per square mile (113.6/km^{2}). The racial makeup of the town was 99.15% White and 0.85% African American. Hispanics or Latinos of any race were 0.85% of the population.

There were 55 households, out of which 18.2% had children under the age of 18 living with them, 49.1% were married couples living together, 1.8% had a female householder with no husband present, and 40.0% were non-families. 38.2% of all households were made up of individuals, and none had someone living alone who was 65 years of age or older. The average household size was 2.15, and the average family size was 2.85.

The age distribution was 22.0% under the age of 18, 4.2% from 18 to 24, 27.1% from 25 to 44, 34.7% from 45 to 64, and 11.9% who were 65 years of age or older. The median age was 43 years. For every 100 females, there were 131.4 males. For every 100 females age 18 and over, there were 130.0 males.

The median income for a household in the town was $44,063, and the median income for a family was $44,375. Males had a median income of $43,750 versus $28,750 for females. The per capita income for the town was $32,647. There were 8.8% of families and 5.4% of the population living below the poverty line, including no under eighteens and none of those over 64.

== Climate ==
According to the Köppen climate classification, Brian Head has a subalpine climate (Dsc). With a mean annual snowfall of 368.4 inches or 9.4 meters, Brian Head is one of the snowiest inhabited places in the United States, receiving over 5 feet (1.5 m) more snow than Valdez, Alaska. Snow depth remains at 7 inches (0.18 m) as late as June, with the average monthly depth being around 75 inches (1.9 m) in March and April, with extremes of over 130 inches or 3.3 meters. The most snowfall in one month was 142 inches or 3.6 meters during March 1995 and the most during a full year 486 inches or 12 meters between July 1997 and June 1998.

Winter temperatures are cold, with 80.3 days each year not topping freezing (a number certainly inflated by the very deep snow cover) and 0 °F (−17.8 °C) reached nineteen times in an average winter. The very heavy snow does not ease until May, when temperatures begin to rise above 50 °F (10 °C), and May and June are also the driest months.

Summer weather in Brian Head is influenced by the tail end of the North American Monsoon, which provides frequent thunderstorms in July and August, though convection is inhibited by the cool temperatures at Brian Head's extreme altitude. After the monsoon retreats, temperatures rapidly fall during September and October, when snow cover is permanently re-established.

Climate data for Brian Head, Utah, 1991–2020 normals (elevation 9,770 feet or 2,978 meters), extremes 1991–present:
Month	Jan	Feb	Mar	Apr	May	Jun	Jul	Aug	Sep	Oct	Nov	Dec	Year
Record high °F (°C)	51 (11)	54 (12)	58 (14)	64 (18)	79 (26)	87 (31)	88 (31)	86 (30)	77 (25)	68 (20)	60 (16)	52 (11)	88 (31)
Mean maximum °F (°C)	44.3 (6.8)	45.8 (7.7)	51.2 (10.7)	57.7 (14.3)	65.0 (18.3)	73.6 (23.1)	77.3 (25.2)	75.4 (24.1)	69.5 (20.8)	60.3 (15.7)	51.8 (11.0)	45.2 (7.3)	78.8 (26.0)
Mean daily maximum °F (°C)	30.4 (−0.9)	32.3 (0.2)	38.9 (3.8)	43.7 (6.5)	55.1 (12.8)	67.0 (19.4)	71.0 (21.7)	68.5 (20.3)	61.2 (16.2)	48.2 (9.0)	38.3 (3.5)	28.4 (−2.0)	48.6 (9.2)
Daily mean °F (°C)	20.4 (−6.4)	22.2 (−5.4)	28.1 (−2.2)	30.8 (−0.7)	41.3 (5.2)	51.5 (10.8)	56.6 (13.7)	55.6 (13.1)	48.0 (8.9)	36.1 (2.3)	27.5 (−2.5)	19.3 (−7.1)	36.5 (2.5)
Mean daily minimum °F (°C)	10.3 (−12.1)	12.0 (−11.1)	17.2 (−8.2)	17.8 (−7.9)	27.4 (−2.6)	36.1 (2.3)	42.2 (5.7)	42.7 (5.9)	34.9 (1.6)	24.0 (−4.4)	16.8 (−8.4)	10.1 (−12.2)	24.3 (−4.3)
Mean minimum °F (°C)	−5.4 (−20.8)	−5.0 (−20.6)	0.3 (−17.6)	7.9 (−13.4)	16.8 (−8.4)	26.7 (−2.9)	37.3 (2.9)	37.5 (3.1)	25.4 (−3.7)	12.4 (−10.9)	0.1 (−17.7)	−5.4 (−20.8)	−9.7 (−23.2)
Record low °F (°C)	−16 (−27)	−18 (−28)	−10 (−23)	−8 (−22)	4 (−16)	17 (−8)	26 (−3)	27 (−3)	11 (−12)	−3 (−19)	−13 (−25)	−12 (−24)	−18 (−28)
Average precipitation inches (mm)	3.69 (94)	4.01 (102)	4.08 (104)	3.12 (79)	1.51 (38)	1.15 (29)	2.46 (62)	2.89 (73)	2.10 (53)	3.11 (79)	2.70 (69)	3.60 (91)	34.42 (873)
Average snowfall inches (cm)	64.1 (163)	66.5 (169)	56.0 (142)	46.0 (117)	9.8 (25)	5.1 (13)	0.0 (0.0)	trace	1.3 (3.3)	25.8 (66)	43.5 (110)	50.3 (128)	368.4 (936.3)
Average extreme snow depth inches (cm)	56.6 (144)	69.1 (176)	78.2 (199)	76.7 (195)	51.3 (130)	12.9 (33)	0.9 (2.3)	0.0 (0.0)	0.6 (1.5)	11.4 (29)	27.8 (71)	43.0 (109)	83.7 (213)
Average precipitation days (≥ 0.01 in)	11.2	12.5	10.6	11.0	7.6	5.5	9.5	11.3	7.5	7.3	8.1	10.8	112.9
Average snowy days (≥ 0.1 in)	11.0	12.1	10.3	9.6	4.1	1.6	0.0	0.1	0.5	4.9	7.2	10.3	71.7
Source 1: NOAA (precip/precip days, snow/snow days 1981–2010)
Source 2: XMACIS2 (records, monthly maxima/minima, snow depth)
