= Utah State Route 20 =

State highway in Iron and Garfield counties in Utah, United States

State Route 20
- SR-20 highlighted in red

Route information
- Maintained by UDOT
- Length: 20.492 mi (32.979 km)
- Existed: 1917 as a state highway; 1927 as SR-20–present

Major junctions
- West end: I-15 near Paragonah
- East end: US 89 near Panguitch

Location
- Country: United States
- State: Utah

Highway system
- Utah State Highway System; Interstate; US; State; Minor; Scenic
← SR-19	→ SR-21

State Route 20 (SR-20) is a state highway in southern Utah, running 20.492 miles (32.979 km) in Iron and Garfield Counties, without directly serving or connecting any cities. It serves as a truck connection between I-15 and US-89 and an access to Bryce Canyon National Park. It may also be used to travel between Salt Lake City and Phoenix, Arizona. The highway follows the route of the Old Spanish Trail.

== Route description ==
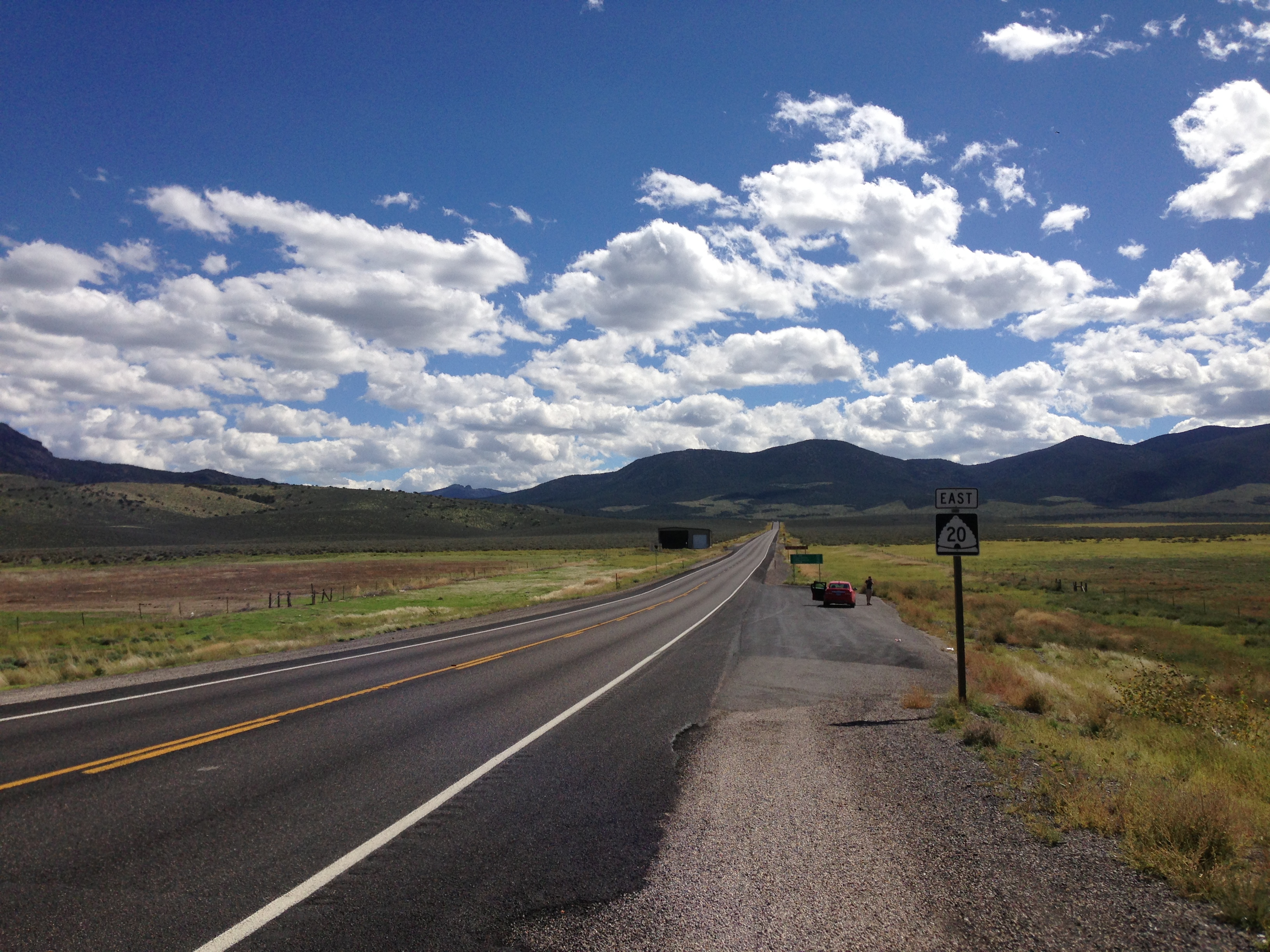
View east from the west end of SR-20

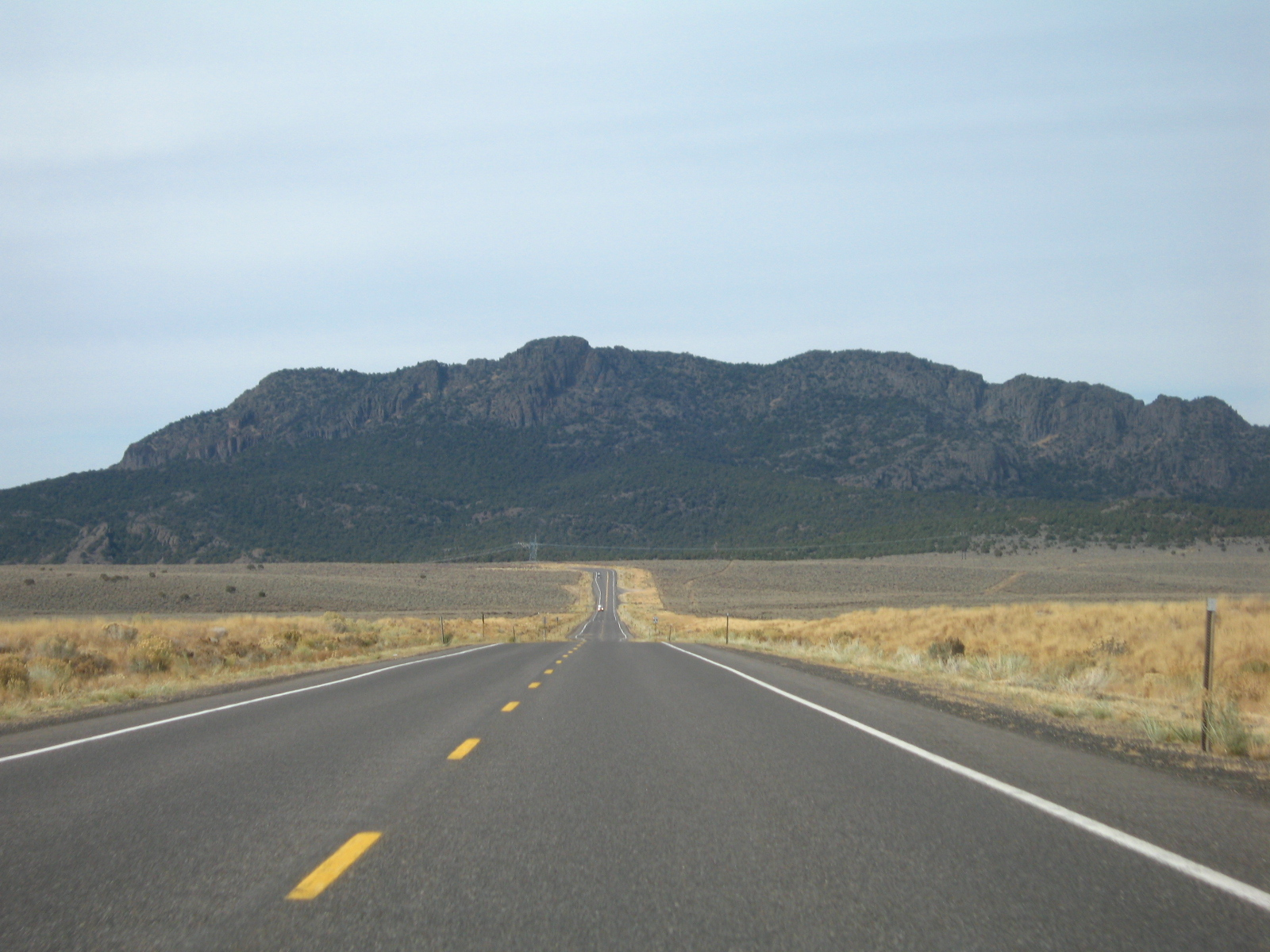
Midway along Utah State Route 20

SR-20 begins at I-15, Exit 95, 14 miles (23 km) north of Paragonah, and heads east and southeast through a pass between the Markagunt Plateau and the Tushar Mountains. It ends at an intersection with US-89 at Bear Valley Junction. Trucks are routed from I-15 and US-89 onto SR-20 in preference to SR-9 and SR-14 to avoid steep grades and switchbacks required to cross the Markagunt Plateau. Because of this, SR-20 is included in the National Highway System. SR-20 itself is a difficult route, featuring 7% grades on the approaches to the 7,910-foot (2,410 m) summit, and oversize vehicles are required to have a pilot escort.

== History ==
The route of SR-20 was first used by non-Native Americans in 1864, by the settlers of Panguitch. It crosses the Tushar Mountains just south of the Old Spanish Trail's crossing.

The road from SR-1 (by 1926 US-91, now SR-271) in Paragonah to SR-11 (by 1926 US-89) at Bear Valley Junction was added to the state highway system in 1917. In 1927, the legislature assigned the State Route 20 designation to it, and in 1953 the west end was moved north to the present junction with I-15, removing Little Creek Canyon Road and Upper Bear Valley Road from the state highway system.

== Major intersections ==
County	Location	mi	km	Destinations	Notes
Iron	Paragonah	0.000– 0.162	0.000– 0.261	I-15 – Cedar City, Salt Lake City	Exit 95 on I-15; western terminus
Garfield	Bear Valley Junction	20.492	32.979	US 89 – Panguitch, Junction	Eastern terminus
1.000 mi = 1.609 km; 1.000 km = 0.621 mi
