= Utah State Route 274 =

State highway in Utah, United States

State Route 274
- Main Street
- SR-274 highlighted in red

Route information
- Maintained by UDOT
- Length: 1.257 mi (2.023 km)
- Existed: 1975–present

Major junctions
- South end: SR-143 in Parowan
- North end: I-15 in Parowan

Location
- Country: United States
- State: Utah

Highway system
- Utah State Highway System; Interstate; US; State; Minor; Scenic
← SR-273	→ SR-275

State Route 274 is a state highway completely within Parowan in the southwestern portion of the US state of Utah that connects SR-143 with I-15. The entirety of the highway is routed along Main Street.

== Route description ==
The route proceeds north along a two-lane undivided highway from the intersection of Center Street (SR-143) and Main Street in the middle of Parowan in Iron County. The road exits the center of Parowan and passes the Parowan Airport before terminating at a diamond interchange at exit 78 on I-15.

== History ==
With the construction of I-15 around Parowan imminent, SR-1 was moved from old US-91 to the proposed bypass in 1968. SR-143, which had ended at SR-1 (Main Street) in Parowan, was extended north on Main Street and a planned connection to I-15 at exit 78. However, plans had changed by the time I-15 was completed in 1975, and a second interchange (exit 75) served the west side of Parowan. SR-143 was instead rerouted south and west to meet I-15 there, and what had become part of SR-143 in 1968 was instead redesignated SR-274.

== Major intersections ==
The entire route is in Parowan, Iron County.

mi	km	Destinations	Notes
0.000	0.000	SR-143 (Center Street)	Southern terminus
		SR-271 – Paragonah	
1.257	2.023	I-15 – Cedar City, Beaver	Northern terminus also Exit 78 on I-15
1.000 mi = 1.609 km; 1.000 km = 0.621 mi
