= Utah State Route 271 =

State highway in Utah, United States

State Route 271
- SR-271 highlighted in red

Route information
- Maintained by UDOT
- Length: 5.647 mi (9.088 km)
- Existed: 1978–present

Major junctions
- South end: SR-274 in Parowan
- North end: I-15 near Paragonah

Location
- Country: United States
- State: Utah

Highway system
- Utah State Highway System; Interstate; US; State; Minor; Scenic
← SR-270	→ SR-273

State Route 271 (SR-271) is a state highway within Iron County in the southwestern portion of the US state of Utah that connects Parowan and SR-274 to Paragonah and I-15. The route spans 5.65 miles (9.09 km) south–north and roughly parallels I-15. State Route 271 was designated in 1978.

== Route description ==
The highway begins at an intersection at SR-274 in the center of Parowan and heads northeast on a two-lane undivided highway. Prior to exiting Parowan, the highway intersects with several local roads and borders the southern side of the Parowan Airport. The road now exits the community and turns north before entering Paragonah and bisecting the town in half. The route intersects six local roads in Paragonah before exiting that town and terminating at a diamond interchange on I-15 at exit 82.

== History ==
The road from Parowan northeast through Paragonah and southwest through Summit was added to the state highway system in 1910, and in the 1920s it became part of SR-1 and US-91. In 1968, with the construction of I-15 in the area imminent, SR-1 was moved to the proposed bypass, and the old route of SR-1 became State Route 38 (I-15 near Summit to Center Street in Parowan), SR-143 (Center Street to near 500 North in Parowan, and then continuing to I-15), and State Route 76 (near 500 North in Parowan to I-15 near Paragonah). However, the state legislature did not concur with the latter, and the old road through Paragonah was maintained only until I-15 was completed. Construction of I-15 was finished by 1975, and included a second Parowan interchange that had not been in the 1968 plans. SR-143 was rerouted to turn south on SR-38 (old SR-1) in Parowan and west on 200 South to the new interchange, and the remainder of SR-38 was removed from the state highway system. (The 1968 extension of SR-143 was redesignated SR-274.) The road from Parowan through Paragonah to I-15 was restored to the state highway system in 1978 as SR-271.

== Major intersections ==
The entire route is in Iron County.

Location	mi	km	Destinations	Notes
Parowan	0.000	0.000	SR-274 / I-15 BL (Main Street)	Southern terminus
Paragonah	5.647	9.088	I-15 – St. George, Beaver	Northern terminus, also Exit 82 on I-15
1.000 mi = 1.609 km; 1.000 km = 0.621 mi
