= Utah State Route 143 =

Highway in Utah

State Route 143
- Brian Head-Panguitch Lake Scenic Byway; Utah's Patchwork Parkway

Route information
- Maintained by UDOT
- Length: 51.206 mi (82.408 km)
- Existed: 1933–present
- Tourist routes: Utah's Patchwork Parkway

Major junctions
- West end: I-15 in Parowan
- East end: US 89 in Panguitch

Location
- Country: United States
- State: Utah

Highway system
- Utah State Highway System; Interstate; US; State; Minor; Scenic
← SR-142	→ SR-144

State Route 143 (SR-143) is a state highway in the U.S. state of Utah. The entire highway has been designated the Brian Head-Panguitch Lake Scenic Byway as part of the Utah Scenic Byways program. This road has also been designated as Utah's Patchwork Parkway as part of the National Forest Scenic Byway and National Scenic Byway programs.

At just over 51 miles (82 km) long, it connects Parowan to Panguitch while providing access to Brian Head, Cedar Breaks National Monument, and Panguitch Lake. It is also the second-highest paved road in the state at 10,626 feet (3,239 m) above sea level.

The western section of the road from Parowan started as a logging road for nineteenth century Mormon pioneers and was designated a state highway in 1933. Twenty years later, the route was extended to Cedar Breaks National Monument, and again in 1985 to its present-day eastern end in Panguitch.

== Route description ==
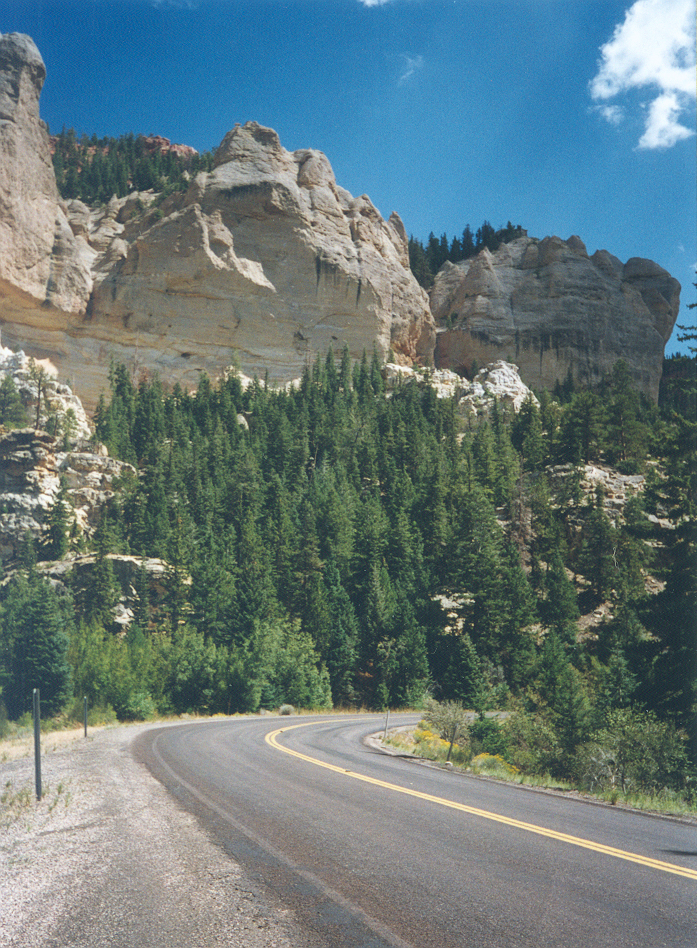
White cliffs and forest on the way up Parowan Canyon

State Route 143 begins at Interstate 15 in Iron County just west of Parowan as 200 South and travels through the center of town before turning south into Parowan Canyon. From here, the route climbs past the Vermillion Cliffs, named for their reddish color produced by iron oxides. Farther up the canyon, the highway passes by the White Cliffs as it enters Dixie National Forest, and begins a steep climb up to Brian Head. The grade reaches 13% in some places, precipitous enough that travel by RVs or semi trucks is not recommended.

As the route climbs onto the Markagunt Plateau at an elevation of nearly 10,000 feet (3,000 m), it enters the town of Brian Head, Utah's highest incorporated city and the home of Utah's highest ski resort, Brian Head Ski Resort. From the top of this plateau, vistas open up allowing for views of over 100 miles (160 km) in every direction. The area is populated with Engelmann spruces, aspens, and alpine meadows full of wildflowers. SR-143 continues climbing southward, passing the northern edge of Cedar Breaks National Monument, a natural amphitheater canyon eroded out of the western edge of the plateau similarly to Bryce Canyon. Here, the route reaches its highest point at 10,626 feet (3,239 m) above sea level, the second-highest paved road in Utah behind the Mirror Lake Highway at 10,715 feet (3,266 m). The route turns to the east here, while continuing south leads to the rest of Cedar Breaks National Monument and State Route 148 (the Cedar Breaks Scenic Byway).

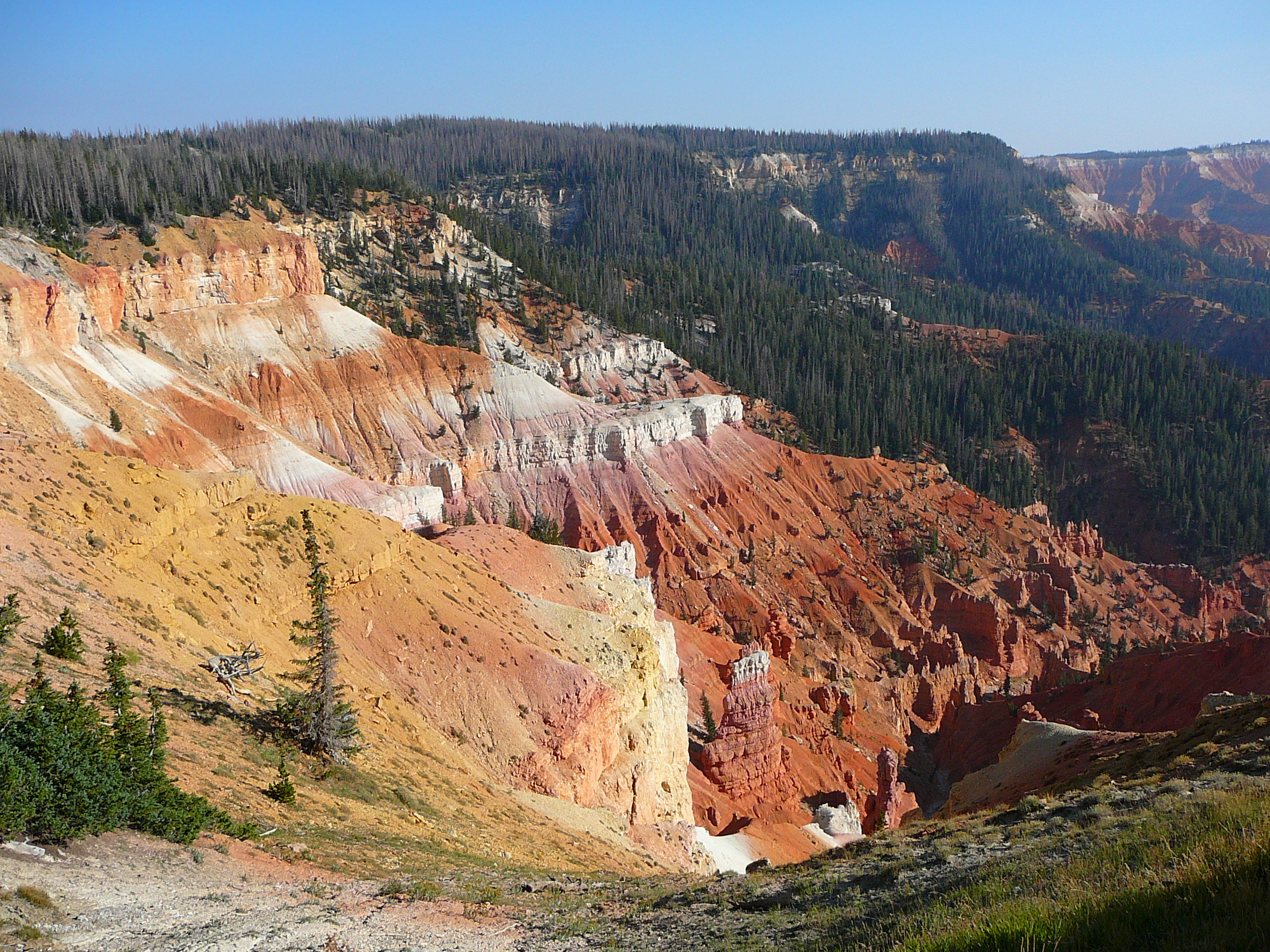
Cedar Breaks National Monument from the overlook on State Route 143

As the highway heads east, it descends through thick aspen forests interspersed with ancient lava fields. Distant views to the Escalante Mountains, Sevier Plateau, and the Pink Cliffs of Paunsaugunt Plateau are visible to the south and east. On this leg of the route, it passes around the south and east sides of Panguitch Lake, which is popular for summertime fishing as well as winter ice fishing. SR-143 continues its descent, heading northeast alongside Panguitch Creek as it enters Garfield County and exits Dixie National Forest. The route ends at U.S. Route 89 in the city of Panguitch, 25 miles (40 km) from Bryce Canyon National Park and just east of the Paunsaugunt Plateau.

== History ==
=== Early roads ===
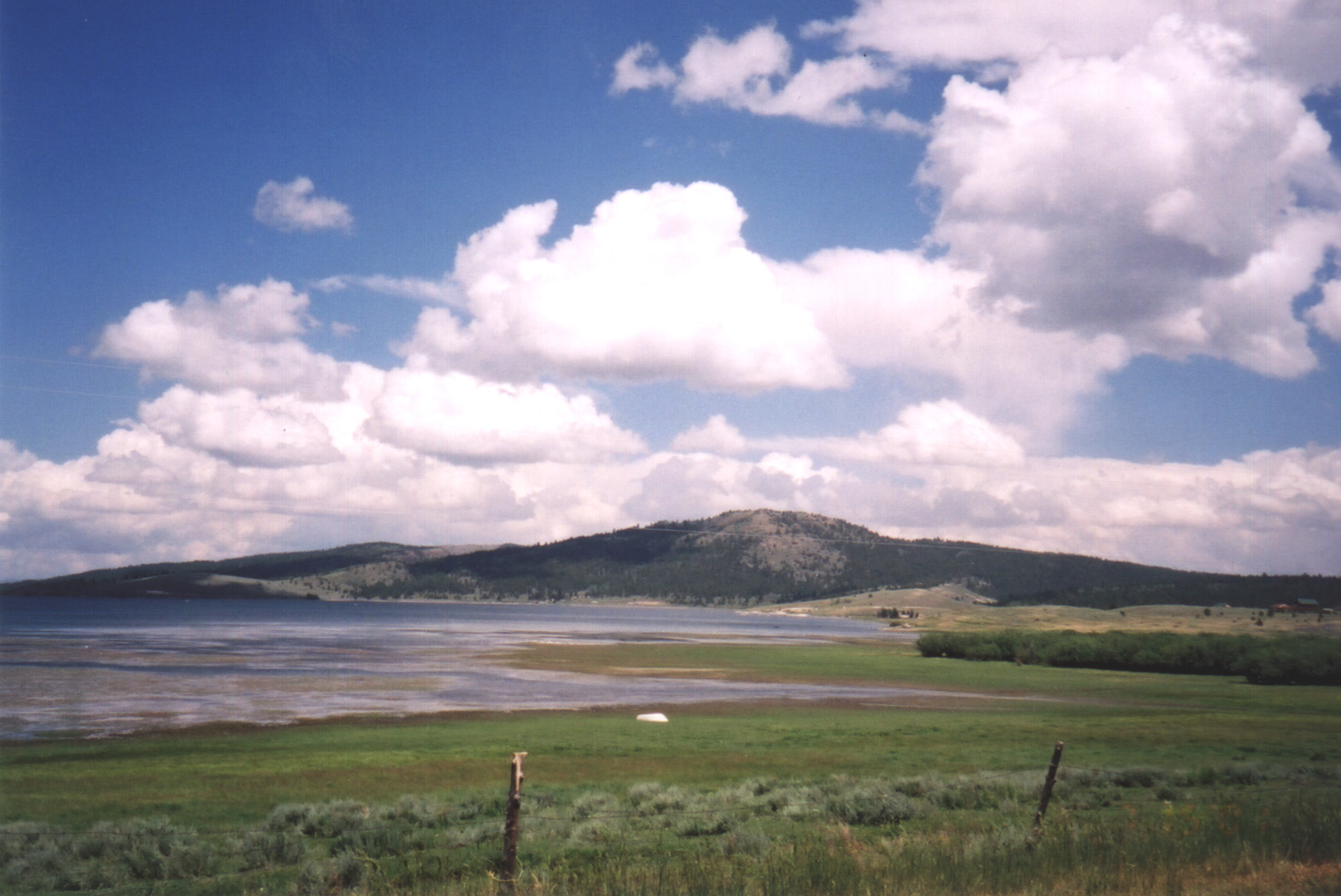
Panguitch Lake

Archaic hunter-gatherers used this route as far back as the Fremont culture (AD 700 – 1300). Evidence of their passage is found along the roadway in the form of rock art. More recently, around the time of European settlement, the area was inhabited by the Southern Paiute people who used much of the Markagunt Plateau for hunting and gathering.

The town of Parowan was settled in 1851 by Mormon pioneers, who built a wagon road up Parowan Canyon to access timber for buildings. Eventually, this road extended south to Cedar Breaks. In 1919, S. A. Halterman took the first automobile to Cedar Breaks via Parowan Canyon. With improvements to the road completed by 1921, he was able to take visitors on weekly trips to the area.

=== Parowan to Cedar Breaks ===
State Route 143 was first commissioned in 1933 as the road from Parowan to the Dixie National Forest boundary. The route was extended in 1953 to reach from U.S. Route 91 (former State Route 1) in Parowan (Main Street) to the north boundary of Cedar Breaks National Monument, increasing its length to over 17 miles (27 km).

The construction of Interstate 15 (I-15) in the Parowan area caused the state legislature to twice modify the alignment of SR-143. The first change came in 1968, due to I-15 being constructed to bypass Parowan west of town, rather than following the route of US-91/SR-1 through the center of town. As a result, the state legislature moved SR-1 west onto the interstate alignment while keeping the old alignment in the state highway system. This was accomplished by designating the former southwestern part of SR-1 from I-15 at Summit to Center street in Parowan as a new highway (SR-38) and extending SR-143 through north Parowan up to I-15, incorporating the northwestern part of the former SR-1 alignment.

In 1975, the construction of I-15 was complete, including a second Parowan interchange that had not been in the original plans. This interchange was located west of Parowan, between the Summit interchange to the southwest, and the Parowan interchange to the north. In response, the legislature rerouted SR-143 to connect to the west interchange. Instead of turning north on Main Street, SR-143 now turned south on Main Street for two blocks (coinciding with SR-38) and turned west to reach the new interchange. The two blocks of Main Street overlapping SR-38 were transferred to SR-143, with the remainder of that route deleted and withdrawn from the state highway system. The former route of SR-143 northerly through Parowan was re-designated SR-274.

=== Cedar Breaks to Panguitch ===
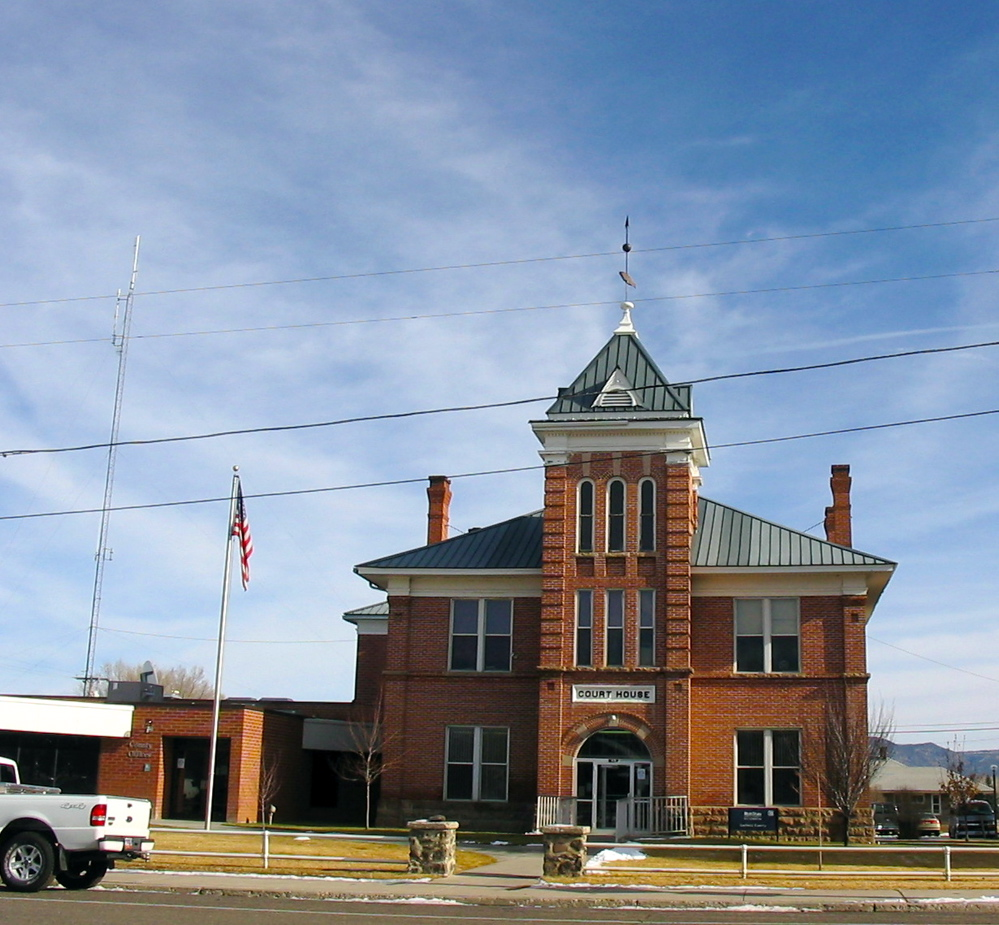
Garfield County courthouse in Panguitch at the eastern end of the route

The other end of SR-143 has undergone route changes as well. Prior to 1969, SR-55 connected SR-14 with the southern boundary of Cedar Breaks National Monument. That year, as part of a major realignment of state highways, SR-55 was deleted and its road was designated as part of SR-143. This left SR-143 as a non-contiguous highway, as the portion going through the national monument was not part of the highway designation.

In 1985, the southern portion of SR-143 between SR-14 and the southern Cedar Breaks National Monument boundary was re-designated SR-148, and Panguitch Lake Road from the eastern monument boundary to US-89 in Panguitch was added to SR-143. In this same legislative resolution, there was a provision that the portion of the route alignments inside the boundaries of the national monument would be included as part of the state highway system once the Utah Department of Transportation was granted a right-of-way easement from federal authorities. In 1994, the legislative description of SR-143 was updated to reflect that this easement had been granted. SR-148 still ends at the south boundary of the national monument.

The route was designated as a Utah Scenic Byway called Brian Head-Panguitch Lake Scenic Byway in 1989, and as a Forest Service Byway called Utah's Patchwork Parkway in 2000. It is also currently being considered for nomination as a federal All-American Road.

== Major intersections ==
County	Location	mi	km	Destinations	Notes
Iron	Parowan	0.000	0.000	I-15 / I-15 BL – Cedar City, Beaver	Western terminus, also Exit 75 on I-15; western terminus of BL-15 overlap
Iron	Parowan	2.651	4.266	SR-274 / I-15 BL (Main Street)	East end of BL-15 overlap
Iron		10.083	16.227	Dry Lakes Road Scenic Backway	
Iron	Cedar Breaks National Monument	19.230	30.948	To SR-148 (Cedar Breaks Scenic Byway)	
Garfield	Panguitch	51.206	82.408	US 89 (Center Street)	Eastern terminus
1.000 mi = 1.609 km; 1.000 km = 0.621 mi: Concurrency terminus
