= Panguitch, Utah =

City and county seat in Utah, United States

- City
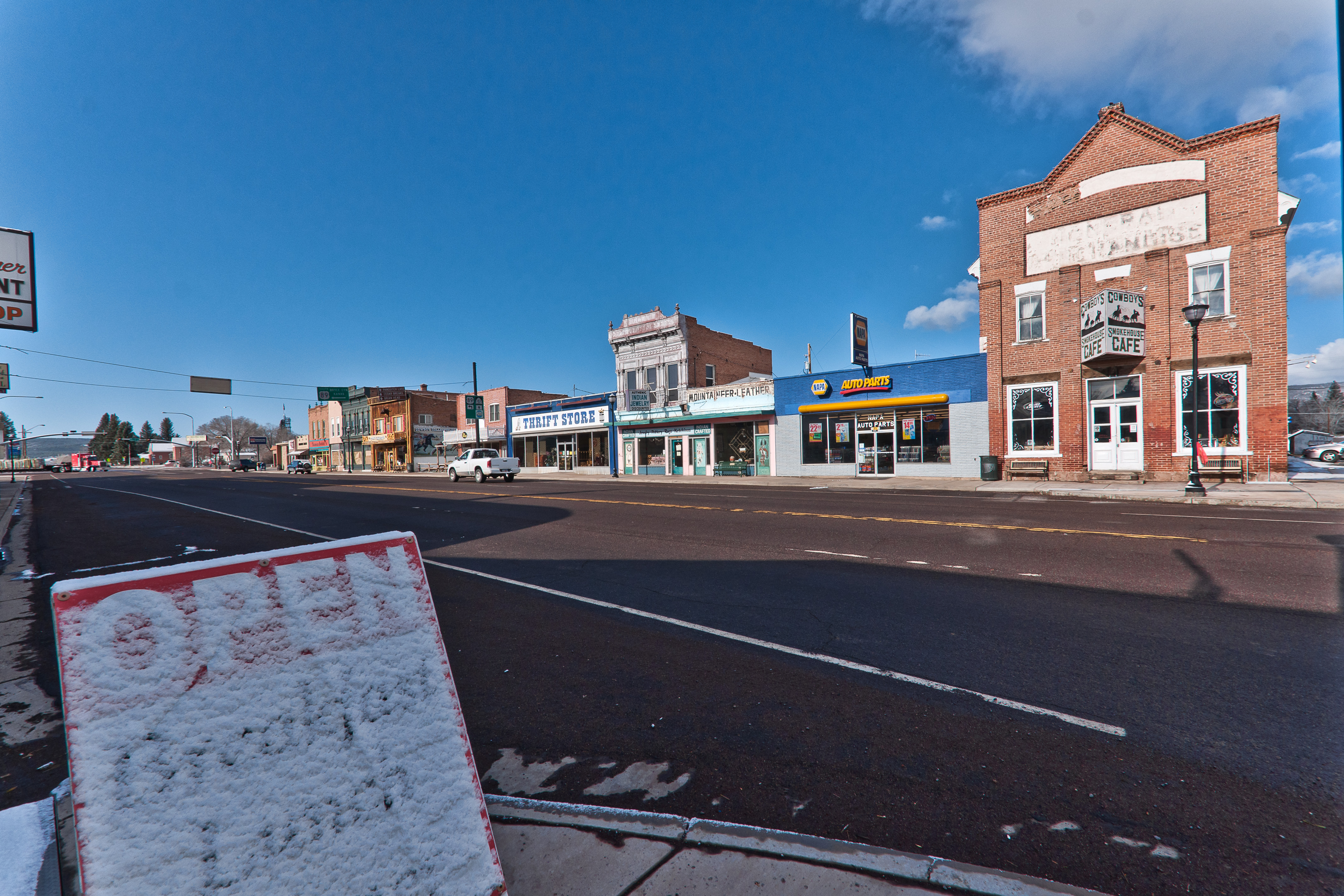
- Panguitch Main Street, April 2010

- Location in Garfield County and state of Utah
- Coordinates: 37°49′20″N 112°26′5″W
- Country: United States
- State: Utah
- County: Garfield
- Settled: 1864
- Incorporated: June 10, 1899
- Named for: Southern Paiute for "big fish"

Government
  - Mayor: Kim Soper
  - Manager: Mat Houston

Area
  - Total: 3.08 sq mi (7.99 km^{2})
  - Land: 3.08 sq mi (7.99 km^{2})
  - Water: 0 sq mi (0.00 km^{2})
- Elevation: 6,624 ft (2,019 m)

Population (2020)
  - Total: 1,725
  - Density: 545/sq mi (210.6/km^{2})
- Time zone: UTC−7 (Mountain (MST))
  - Summer (DST): UTC−6 (MDT)
- ZIP code: 84759
- Area code: 435
- FIPS code: 49-57740
- GNIS feature ID: 1444170
- Website: panguitchutah.gov

Panguitch (/ˈpæŋɡwɪtʃ/ PANG-gwitch) is a city in and the county seat of Garfield County, Utah, United States. The population was 1,725 at the 2020 census. The name Panguitch comes from a Southern Paiute word meaning “Big Fish,” likely named after the plentiful nearby lakes hosting rainbow trout year-round.

== Geography ==
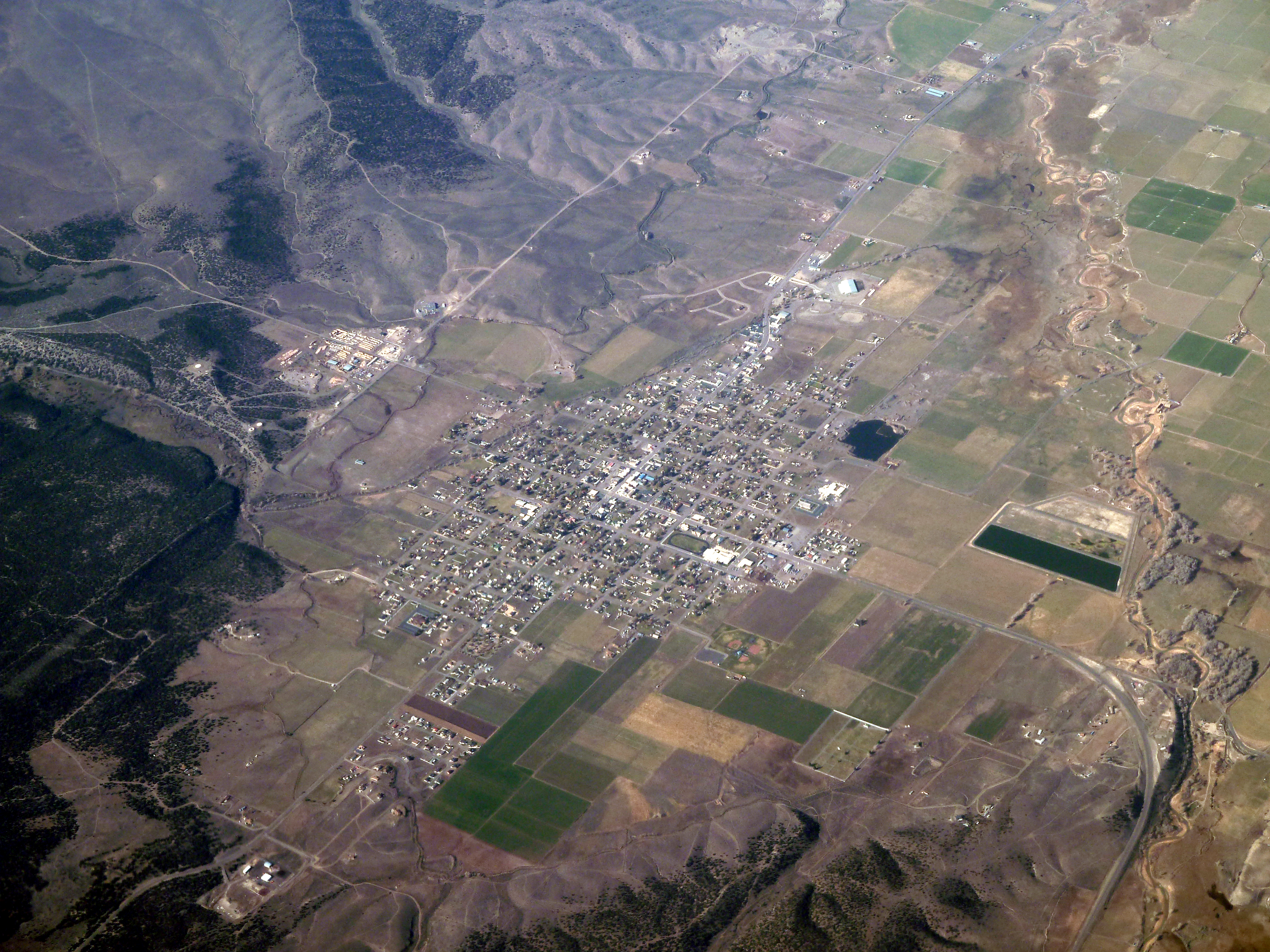
Aerial photo of Panguitch, November 2010

Panguitch is located on the western edge of Garfield County at 37°49′20″N 112°26′5″W (37.822234, -112.434650), in the valley of the Sevier River. U.S. Route 89 passes through the center of town, leading north 33 miles (53 km) to Junction and south 45 miles (72 km) to Orderville. Utah State Route 143 leads southwest from Panguitch 17 miles (27 km) to Panguitch Lake in Dixie National Forest.

According to the United States Census Bureau, the city has a total area of 2.1 square miles (5.5 km^{2}), all land.

=== Climate ===
Panguitch has a cool semi-arid climate (Köppen BSk) with summers featuring hot afternoons and cold mornings, and cold, dry winters. The high altitude and relatively high latitude means that mornings are cold throughout the year and freezing for most of it: between 1971 and 2000 an average of 227.7 mornings fell below freezing and 16.5 mornings fell to or below 0 °F (−17.8 °C). Maxima, however, can be expected to top freezing on all but fourteen afternoons during an average year, and the winters are so dry that snowfall is light, averaging only 19.2 inches or 0.49 metres with median cover never much above 1 inch or 0.025 metres. The most snowfall in a month has been 32.0 inches (0.81 m) in the famously cold January 1949, and the most in a season 48.5 inches (1.23 m) from July 1951 to June 1952. Mild, dry winters like 1976/1977 and 1980/1981 can in contrast see negligible snowfall for an entire season.

In a manner more akin to Arizona than northern Utah, most of the limited precipitation occurs during the July to October monsoon season, but Garfield County is usually too far north to receive the monsoon's full benefit. The wettest month on record has been August 1987 with 5.17 inches (131.3 mm), and the wettest day was August 18, 1984, with 1.87 inches (47.5 mm). Panguitch's wettest was 1967, with 17.06 inches (433.3 mm) of rainfall. However, only 6.15 inches (156.2 mm) of rain fell in 1989.

Climate data for Panguitch, Utah, 1991–2020 normals, 1911-2020 extremes: 6647ft (2026m)
| Month | Jan | Feb | Mar | Apr | May | Jun | Jul | Aug | Sep | Oct | Nov | Dec | Year |
|---|---|---|---|---|---|---|---|---|---|---|---|---|---|
| Record high °F (°C) | 63 (17) | 69 (21) | 83 (28) | 85 (29) | 96 (36) | 98 (37) | 102 (39) | 99 (37) | 94 (34) | 85 (29) | 77 (25) | 64 (18) | 102 (39) |
| Mean maximum °F (°C) | 52.5 (11.4) | 57.6 (14.2) | 67.7 (19.8) | 76.3 (24.6) | 83.9 (28.8) | 92.1 (33.4) | 95.4 (35.2) | 91.9 (33.3) | 87.4 (30.8) | 78.7 (25.9) | 66.3 (19.1) | 54.0 (12.2) | 95.6 (35.3) |
| Mean daily maximum °F (°C) | 39.2 (4.0) | 43.7 (6.5) | 52.3 (11.3) | 59.7 (15.4) | 69.3 (20.7) | 81.5 (27.5) | 86.1 (30.1) | 83.2 (28.4) | 76.5 (24.7) | 64.3 (17.9) | 50.3 (10.2) | 39.0 (3.9) | 62.1 (16.7) |
| Daily mean °F (°C) | 23.7 (−4.6) | 27.5 (−2.5) | 35.6 (2.0) | 41.5 (5.3) | 50.4 (10.2) | 60.2 (15.7) | 66.4 (19.1) | 63.8 (17.7) | 56.0 (13.3) | 44.6 (7.0) | 32.9 (0.5) | 23.1 (−4.9) | 43.8 (6.6) |
| Mean daily minimum °F (°C) | 8.1 (−13.3) | 11.3 (−11.5) | 18.9 (−7.3) | 23.2 (−4.9) | 31.4 (−0.3) | 38.8 (3.8) | 46.6 (8.1) | 44.4 (6.9) | 35.4 (1.9) | 24.9 (−3.9) | 15.5 (−9.2) | 7.3 (−13.7) | 25.5 (−3.6) |
| Mean minimum °F (°C) | −8.9 (−22.7) | −3.2 (−19.6) | 6.8 (−14.0) | 13.8 (−10.1) | 21.8 (−5.7) | 30.4 (−0.9) | 37.8 (3.2) | 37.3 (2.9) | 26.2 (−3.2) | 13.8 (−10.1) | −0.5 (−18.1) | −9.2 (−22.9) | −11.6 (−24.2) |
| Record low °F (°C) | −38 (−39) | −31 (−35) | −15 (−26) | −2 (−19) | 10 (−12) | 17 (−8) | 29 (−2) | 25 (−4) | 14 (−10) | −10 (−23) | −22 (−30) | −32 (−36) | −38 (−39) |
| Average precipitation inches (mm) | 0.57 (14) | 0.70 (18) | 0.66 (17) | 0.57 (14) | 0.68 (17) | 0.42 (11) | 1.40 (36) | 1.72 (44) | 1.27 (32) | 1.18 (30) | 0.67 (17) | 0.52 (13) | 10.36 (263) |
| Average snowfall inches (cm) | 7.80 (19.8) | 6.10 (15.5) | 3.30 (8.4) | 1.10 (2.8) | 0.10 (0.25) | 0.30 (0.76) | 0.00 (0.00) | 0.00 (0.00) | 0.00 (0.00) | 0.20 (0.51) | 2.10 (5.3) | 4.00 (10.2) | 25 (63.52) |
Source 1: NOAA
Source 2: XMACIS2 (records & monthly max/mins)

== History ==
Panguitch was first settled in March 1864, when Jens Nielsen, a Danish convert to the Church of Jesus Christ of Latter-day Saints, led a group of 54 families eastward from Parowan and Beaver to the Sevier River. Due to the area's high elevation, 6,600 feet (2,000 m) above sea level, winter's cold weather arrived early in the year, and most of the settlers' initial crops were killed by frost before they could mature. At a crisis point, seven men left the community to seek flour and foodstuffs from surrounding communities. Heavy snow forced the abandonment of wagons and teams, and the men had no option but to continue on foot, reportedly by laying one quilt after another upon the snow to keep from sinking in too deeply. Parowan settlers eventually gave the rescuers grain that they could take back to the hungry families in Panguitch. However, the rescuers still had to transport the grain on foot over the mountain back to the teams they had temporarily deserted, then on to Panguitch, where they were greeted with a joyous welcome. In local lore, some refer to the rescuer's trek as "the quilt walk."

Due to the Black Hawk War to the north, church officials decided the settlers should abandon the area, and they did so in May 1865. Five years later, Brigham Young decided it was time to try again, and new settlers arrived in 1871. The settlers built a fort, where they lived until more housing could be built and the fields could be replanted. They harvested a lot of grain, so much that they built a grist mill. The settlers cut lumber from the forests and processed it in sawmills and shingle mills. They had a tannery to produce leather from local cattle. The settlers used kilns to process local clay into rose-colored bricks. Workers were paid in bricks, which they used to build their own houses. Rose-colored brick houses still stand in Panguitch.

Panguitch was incorporated in 1899. A social hall was built in 1900, but it burned down in 1920. A new social hall replaced it, and it continues to stand, as the Panguitch Playhouse. The Panguitch Indian School operated from 1904 to 1909, primarily housing Utah Paiutes and Kaibab Paiutes. Students as young as six were taken from their tribe and forced to live at the school overseen by the federal government. Some children were taken at gunpoint from St. George and Moccasin, Arizona.

Timber and livestock production were successful industries in Panguitch until the economic shifts following World War I.

Since the establishment of Bryce Canyon National Park and the designation of nearby areas as national forests, tourism has played a major role in the local economy.

The National Register of Historic Places designated the entire town the Panguitch Historic District in 2007.

== Demographics ==
Historical population
| Census | Pop. | Note | %± |
|---|---|---|---|
| 1880 | 846 | | — |
| 1890 | 1,015 | | 20.0% |
| 1900 | 883 | | −13.0% |
| 1910 | 1,338 | | 51.5% |
| 1920 | 1,473 | | 10.1% |
| 1930 | 1,541 | | 4.6% |
| 1940 | 1,979 | | 28.4% |
| 1950 | 1,501 | | −24.2% |
| 1960 | 1,435 | | −4.4% |
| 1970 | 1,318 | | −8.2% |
| 1980 | 1,343 | | 1.9% |
| 1990 | 1,444 | | 7.5% |
| 2000 | 1,623 | | 12.4% |
| 2010 | 1,520 | | −6.3% |
| 2020 | 1,725 | | 13.5% |

=== 2020 census ===
As of the 2020 census, Panguitch had a population of 1,725. The median age was 38.0 years, with 27.7% of residents under the age of 18 and 21.4% aged 65 years or older. For every 100 females there were 109.1 males, and for every 100 females age 18 and over there were 105.3 males age 18 and over.

0.0% of residents lived in urban areas, while 100.0% lived in rural areas.

There were 578 households in Panguitch, of which 32.7% had children under the age of 18 living in them. Of all households, 63.8% were married-couple households, 13.7% were households with a male householder and no spouse or partner present, and 19.2% were households with a female householder and no spouse or partner present. About 23.1% of all households were made up of individuals and 12.6% had someone living alone who was 65 years of age or older.

There were 732 housing units, of which 21.0% were vacant. The homeowner vacancy rate was 1.3% and the rental vacancy rate was 10.0%.

Racial composition as of the 2020 census
| Race | Number | Percent |
|---|---|---|
| White | 1,577 | 91.4% |
| Black or African American | 5 | 0.3% |
| American Indian and Alaska Native | 37 | 2.1% |
| Asian | 10 | 0.6% |
| Native Hawaiian and Other Pacific Islander | 3 | 0.2% |
| Some other race | 34 | 2.0% |
| Two or more races | 59 | 3.4% |
| Hispanic or Latino (of any race) | 91 | 5.3% |

=== 2000 census ===
As of the 2000 census, there were 1,623 people, 502 households, and 392 families residing in the city. The population density was 1,194.0 people per square mile (460.8/km^{2}). There were 620 housing units at an average density of 456.1 per square mile (176.0/km^{2}). The racial makeup of the city was 94.02% White, 0.49% African American, 2.46% Native American, 0.12% Asian, 2.16% from other races, and 0.74% from two or more races. Hispanic or Latino of any race were 2.90% of the population.

There were 502 households, out of which 40.4% had children under the age of 18 living with them, 67.3% were married couples living together, 8.4% had a female householder with no husband present, and 21.9% were non-families. 19.1% of all households were made up of individuals, and 11.2% had someone living alone who was 65 years of age or older. The average household size was 3.05 and the average family size was 3.55.

In the city, the population was spread out, with 32.8% under the age of 18, 8.9% from 18 to 24, 23.2% from 25 to 44, 21.0% from 45 to 64, and 14.1% who were 65 years of age or older. The median age was 32 years. For every 100 females, there were 106.8 males. For every 100 females age 18 and over, there were 111.0 males.

The median income for a household in the city was $33,500, and the median income for a family was $39,904. Males had a median income of $28,259 versus $19,375 for females. The per capita income for the city was $12,439. About 6.2% of families and 9.6% of the population were below the poverty line, including 14.8% of those under age 18 and 6.6% of those age 65 or over.

== Transportation ==
U.S. Highway 89 runs through Panguitch from Circleville in the north to Kanab in the south. State Route 143 runs south to Panguitch Lake.

== In popular culture ==
In the science-fiction film Contact (1997), a fictional religious fanatic and suicide bomber named Joseph, played by Jake Busey, filmed his explanation for his death in a hotel in Panguitch.

== Notable people ==
- J. Elliot Cameron, religious leader and educator
- J. Arthur Cooper, academic and politician
- Lloyd Frandsen, politician
- Obed Crosby Haycock, professor and radio engineer, born in Panguitch
- Tut Imlay, athlete
- Don Ipson, accountant and politician who attended Panguitch High School.
- Wayne Owens, attorney and politician born in Panguitch
- Richard Stithem, athlete
- Evan Vickers, pharmacist and politician

== See also ==
- List of cities in Utah
- Panguitch Lake
