= Lloyd Frandsen =

American politician

Member of the Utah House of Representatives from the 50th district
- In office January 1, 1995 – December 31, 2000
- Preceded by: Clark L. Reber
- Succeeded by: Merlynn Newbold
- In office 1988 – December 31, 1992
- In office January 1, 1983 – December 31, 1986
- In office January 1, 1975 – December 31, 1978

Personal details
- Born: February 16, 1948 Panguitch, Utah
- Died: May 29, 2021 (aged 73) Taylorsville, Utah
- Party: Republican

Lloyd Frandsen (February 16, 1948 – May 29, 2021) was an American politician who served in the Utah House of Representatives from the 50th district from 1975 to 1978, 1983 to 1986, 1988 to 1992 and again from 1995 to 2000.

Hr died of Parkinson's disease on May 29, 2021, in Taylorsville, Utah at age 73.
