= Ashdown Gorge Wilderness =

Protected wilderness area in Utah, United States

- IUCN category Ib (wilderness area)
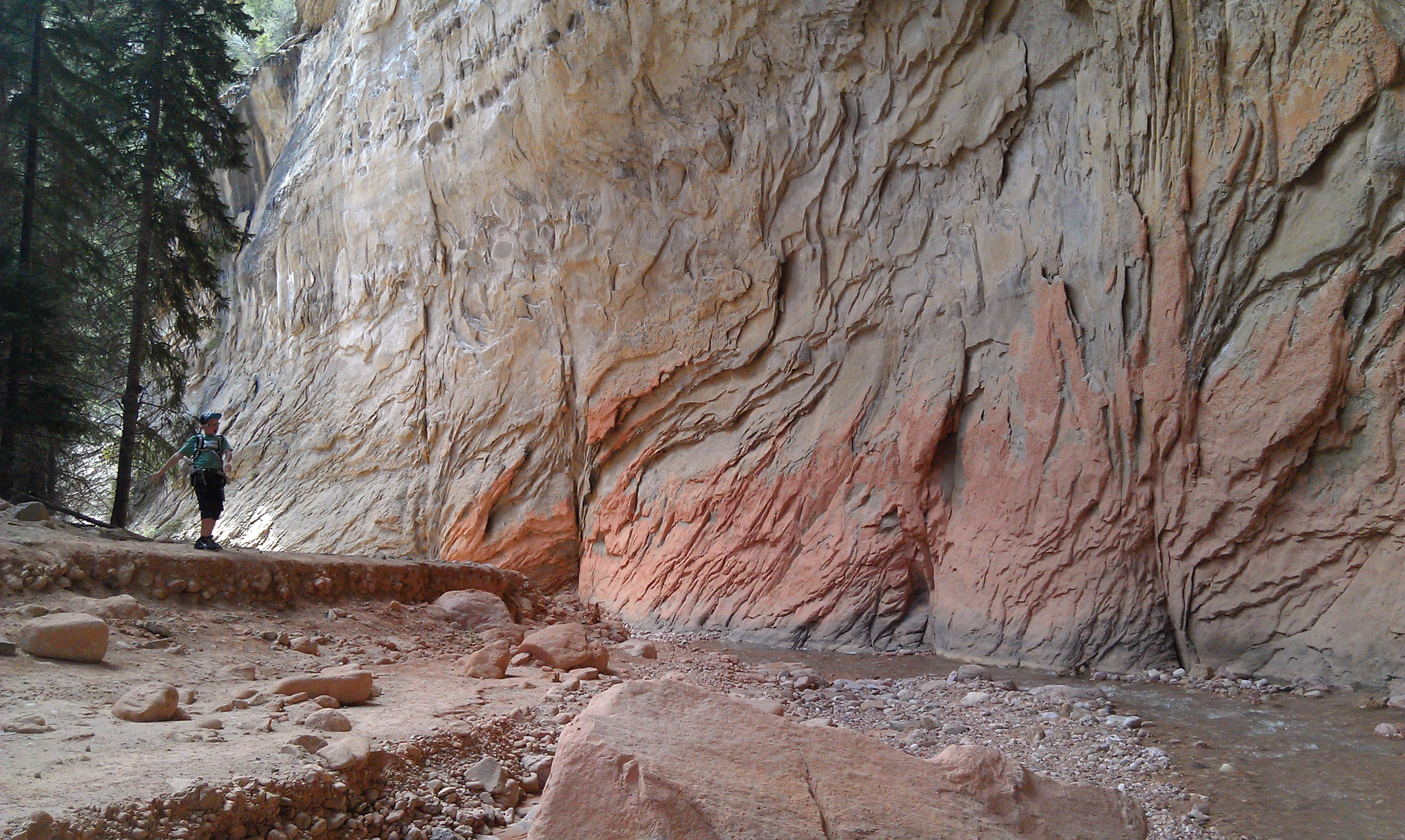
- Ashdown Creek in the Ashdown Gorge Wilderness, August 2013

- Location within the United States
- Location: Iron County, Utah; United States
- Nearest city: Cedar City
- Coordinates: 37.6438664°N 112.8888329°W
- Area: 7,043 acres (28.5 km^{2})
- Established: September 18, 1984
- Governing body: United States Forest Service

The Ashdown Gorge Wilderness is located in eastern Iron County, Utah, United States, within the arid Colorado Plateau region.

== Description ==
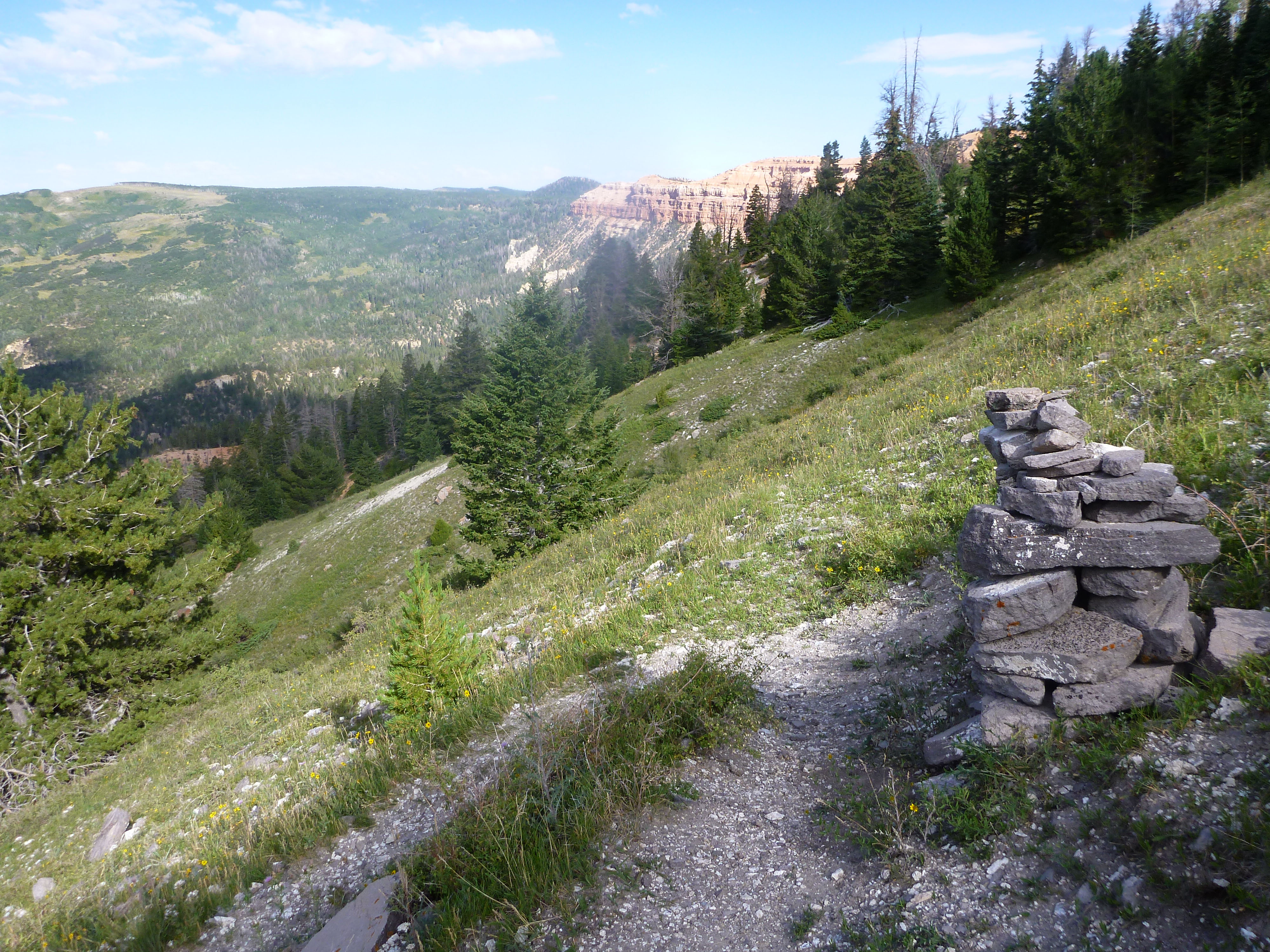
Along the Rattlesnake Creek Trail in the Ashdown Creek Wilderness, August 2013

The wilderness is within the Dixie National Forest adjacent to Cedar Breaks National Monument and characterized by extremely steep-walled canyons cut through the west rim of the Markagunt Plateau. Elevations in the wilderness range from 10,500 feet (3,200 m) to 7,500 feet (2,300 m). Rattlesnake Creek and Ashdown Creek flow through the wilderness. The 7,043 acres (28.5 km^{2}) wilderness area was designated by the U.S. Congress in 1984 and is administered is by the United States Forest Service.

Like the more famous Cedar Breaks National Monument, Ashdown Gorge is known for its multicolored rock formations and plateau-top stands of 1,000-year-old bristlecone pines. The Gorge is named after the family of George Ashdown who set up a sawmill there in 1898. Today there are 320 acres (1.3 km^{2}) of private land inholdings mostly surrounded by the wilderness.

In 2006, Iron County officials were considering a proposal to expand Cedar Breaks National Monument to include the Ashdown Gorge Wilderness, the private inholdings and nearby Flanigan Arch. With congressional approval the area would be renamed Cedar Breaks National Park.

== See also ==
- Dixie National Forest
- Wilderness
- National Wilderness Preservation System
- List of U.S. Wilderness Areas
- Wilderness Act
