= Obed Crosby Haycock =

American scientist and educator

Obed Crosby Haycock (October 5, 1901 – December 10, 1983) was an American scientist, educator, and radio station owner. He spent most of his career at the University of Utah. He started a radio station, KLGN, in Logan, Utah in 1954.

== Early life ==
He was born in Panguitch, Utah, on October 5, 1901. His parents were Edna Crosby and George Albert Haycock. He received his B.S. in electrical engineering from the University of Utah in 1925. He also had studied at Utah State University. He received a master of Science from Purdue University in 1931.

During World War II, he researched radio communication in the jungles of Panama. He also served as director of vocational education in Utah.

== Career ==
Crosby was a research engineer at Rutgers University from 1944 to 1945. He became a professor of electrical engineering at the University of Utah and taught there for 33 years. He started and operated a radio station KLGN in Logan, Utah in 1954 which he later sold.

He became director of the upper air research labs at the University of Utah in 1957, serving in this capacity for ten years and spending 43 years at the university. In this capacity, he pioneered the use of rockets to study the upper atmosphere, starting this work with German V-2 rockets captured during World War II. His research involved the upper atmosphere including the ionosphere/magnetosphere which is involved in diverse phenomena including the Aurora Borealis, weather patterns, and radio transmission. He did much of his research for the United States Army and later the United States Air Force. He was present during the detonation of the nuclear weapon at Bikini Atoll where he observed the effects of such on the ionosphere.

He received the Outstanding Engineer Award from the University of Utah. He was a fellow of IEEE. He was a member of Phi Beta Phi honorary engineering fraternity, Sigma Xi, and Tau Beta Pi.

He wrote and contributed to many professional publications. This included an article on the coming of electrical power to Utah for the Utah Historical Quarterly.

== Personal life ==
Haycock married Martha Mary Harding in Pittsburgh, Pennsylvania on August 12, 1926. They had five children: Jean Haycock, Don H. Haycock, Ralph Hugh Haycock, Richard Haycock and Lois Haycock. Haycock married Ellen Lyon Smith on July 1, 1964.

Haycock was a member of The Church of Jesus Christ of Latter-day Saints. He was active in the Boy Scouts of America and served as a scoutmaster for many years.

He died on December 10, 1983, in Salt Lake City, Utah. He was buried at the Salt Lake City Cemetery.
