= Panguitch Lake =

Reservoir in the state of Utah, United States

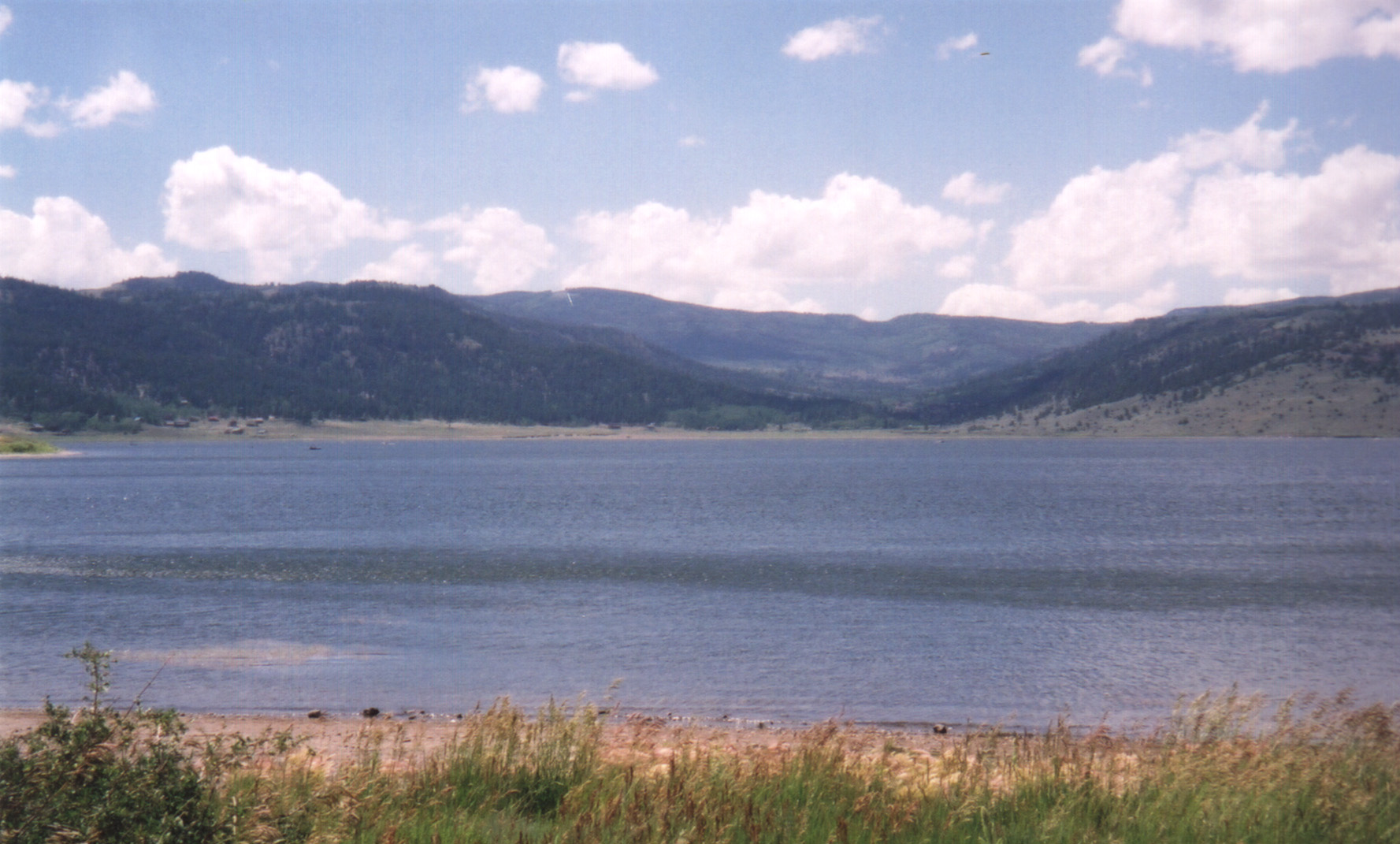
- Shore of Panguitch Lake, looking northwest

- Location within Utah Location within the United States
- Location: Garfield County, Utah, United States
- Coordinates: 37°42′55″N 112°38′33″W
- Type: natural lake, reservoir
- Basin countries: United States
- Surface area: 1,248 acres (5 km^{2})
- Surface elevation: 8,215 ft (2,504 m)

Panguitch Lake (/ˈpæŋɡwɪtʃ/) was originally a large natural lake (777 acres) that has now been expanded by the creation of a 24-foot (7 m) dam to become a reservoir with a maximum surface area of 1,248 acres (5 km^{2}). The lake, which drains into the Sevier River is located on the Markagunt Plateau, between Panguitch, Utah and Cedar Breaks National Monument. The lake is located in the Dixie National Forest in a high tourist use area near three national parks and one national monument.

Panguitch Lake contains several campgrounds. Convenience stores and a Latter-day Saint chapel are within walking distance of the campgrounds, and the roads are well paved and maintained. Road access to the lake is provided by Utah State Route 143, also known as the Brian Head-Panguitch Lake Scenic Byway or Utah's Patchwork Parkway.

== History ==
The earliest known use of Panguitch Lake was as a fishery by Paiute Indians (Panguitch means "big fish" in the Paiute language). Panguitch Lake was treated with rotenone beginning May 1, 2006 to potentially eradicate and control the invasive population of Utah chub, which were probably introduced accidentally by anglers who used them as live bait. The lake was restocked with 20,000 rainbow trout in 2006; as of 2016, the lake's fish population has recovered.

In April 2024, transverse cracking was discovered in the Panguitch Lake dam and it was put under observation. Utah State Route 143 nearby was closed as a precaution. The National Weather Service issued a flash flood watch beneath the dam as a precautionary measure. After beginning controlled water releases and doing a more detailed inspection of the dam, the Utah Division of Water Rights stated they do not believe a dam failure is imminent; but are continuing to monitor the structure. By April 12th, preemptive evacuation notices were relaxed as officials felt the condition at the dam was improving. A storage restriction was put on the reservoir to ease the burden on the dam.
