= J. Elliot Cameron =

Military career
- 1944 - 1946
- Allegiance: United States of America
- Service/branch: United States Army
- Rank: Master Sergeant
- Battles/wars: World War II

Personal details
- Born: February 9, 1923; Panguitch, Utah, United States
- Died: February 27, 2011 (aged 88); Provo, Utah, United States
- Resting place: East Lawn Memorial Hills Cemetery; 40.294°N 111.646°W
- Spouse(s): Maxine Petty
- Children: 4
- Parents: Benjamin A. Cameron; Leonia Sargent

J. Elliot Cameron (February 9, 1923 – February 27, 2011) was an American educator and leader in the Church of Jesus Christ of Latter-day Saints (LDS Church).

== Early life and education ==
Cameron was born in Panguitch, Utah to Benjamin Archie Cameron and Leonia Sargent. He served in the United States Army during World War II and became a specialist in hospital administration. Cameron attended the University of Utah, Utah State University (USU), and Southern Utah State College (now Southern Utah University) and earned bachelor's, master's (both 1948), and doctorate degrees (1966) from Brigham Young University (BYU) in Provo, Utah.

== Public school career ==
Cameron began teaching at Lincoln High School (now Orem High School) in Orem, Utah, in 1948. He served as principal of Duchesne High School in 1949. From 1950 to 1953 he was principal of South Sevier High School, and from 1953 to 1956 he was the superintendent of the Sevier School District.

== Cameron report ==
In the fall of 1964, Cameron served on a committee with seven general authorities of the LDS Church that evaluated the idea of the church building more junior colleges. The so-called "Cameron Report" that the committee published with the recommendation that no new church institutions of higher education be built and that no new programs be inaugurated. The report instead advocated the establishment of primary and secondary schools for church members in areas where such schools were not easily available.

== Educational leadership ==
From 1956 to 1958, Cameron was the president of Snow College in Ephraim, Utah.

After his time at Snow, Cameron became dean of student services at USU. In 1962, he became the dean of students at BYU, and in 1972 his title was changed to dean of student life.

In 1980, Cameron became president of Brigham Young University-Hawaii. It was while Cameron was in this position that the school first made contacts with Chinese officials. He also oversaw the completion of the Lorenzo Snow Administration Building and the Cannon Activities Center.

In 1986, Cameron succeeded Henry B. Eyring as Commissioner of Church Education for the LDS Church. In 1989, the position of Commissioner of Church Education was abolished and Cameron retired. The position was subsequently revived in 1992 with Eyring serving another term.

== Other service ==
Cameron also served as a bishop, stake president, regional representative, and member of the general board of the church's Sunday School. Cameron was a contributing editor to the 1992 Encyclopedia of Mormonism and was a frequent contributor to magazines published by the LDS Church.

From 1989 to 1992, Cameron served as president of the church's Provo Utah Temple.

In 1996, Cameron served as the National President of the Sons of Utah Pioneers organization. Cameron also served as a chairman of the Utah Pioneer Sesquicentennial Coordinating Council.

Cameron and his wife, the former Maxine Petty, were the parents of four children. Cameron died peacefully in Provo, Utah, from causes incident to age.
