= J. Arthur Cooper =

American politician (1933–2025)

Member of the Utah House of Representatives from the Garfield County district
- In office 1959–1961
- Preceded by: Nethella Griffin
- Succeeded by: Nethella Griffin

Personal details
- Born: January 22, 1933 Panguitch, Utah, U.S.
- Died: February 5, 2025 (aged 92) St. George, Utah, U.S.
- Party: Republican
- Spouse: Carol Joy Shirts (m. 1959; div. 1986)
- Children: 5
- Parents: Jeddie Cooper (father); LaVerda Montague (mother)

Jed Arthur Cooper (January 22, 1933 – February 5, 2025) was an American academic and politician from the state of Utah. He served as a Republican member of the Utah House of Representatives from 1959 to 1961.

== Life and career ==
Cooper was born in Panguitch, Utah, on January 22, 1933, at the home of his parents, Jeddie and LaVerda (née Montague) Cooper. He grew up in Panguitch and attended Stanford University and the University of Utah before earning a Ph.D. in education from Vanderbilt Peabody College. He married Carol Joy Shirts in 1959, they had five children, and they divorced in 1986. They were members of the Church of Jesus Christ of Latter-day Saints.

Cooper was a weather observer in the U.S. Air Force from 1956 until he was elected to the Utah House of Representatives in 1958, defeating incumbent Democrat Nethella Griffin by a vote of 868 to 469 to represent Garfield County. At the time, he was the youngest member on record of the Utah State Legislature, having been elected at the minimum required age of 25. He authored the legislation that officially designated the beehive as the state emblem and industry as the state motto, officially designating two traditional state symbols. He opposed legislation to reverse Utah's status as a right-to-work state, and advocated for a Glen Canyon access road.

Cooper served on the education faculty, first at the University of Arizona from 1964 to 1966, then at the University of North Texas from 1966 to 1998. In 1970, he went abroad, and taught at Universidad Católica Santa María La Antigua in Panama City for 20 months. He also served on the school board of the Argyle Independent School District for ten years. In 1966, he authored a book on the cultural development of the Otavalo people of Ecuador, having conducted field research in 1963. He authored an article in the journal of the National Education Association, encouraging educators to be more politically active, which was placed in the Congressional Record on April 4, 1967, by Senator Wayne Morse. He served as president of the Southwestern Philosophy of Education Society from 1971 to 1972.

After retiring, he moved back to Panguitch, where he would serve on the city council and won a four-year term as mayor in 2005. He died in St. George, Utah, on February 5, 2025, at the age of 92.
