= Cedar Breaks National Monument =

National monument in Iron County, Utah, United States

- IUCN category V (protected landscape/seascape)
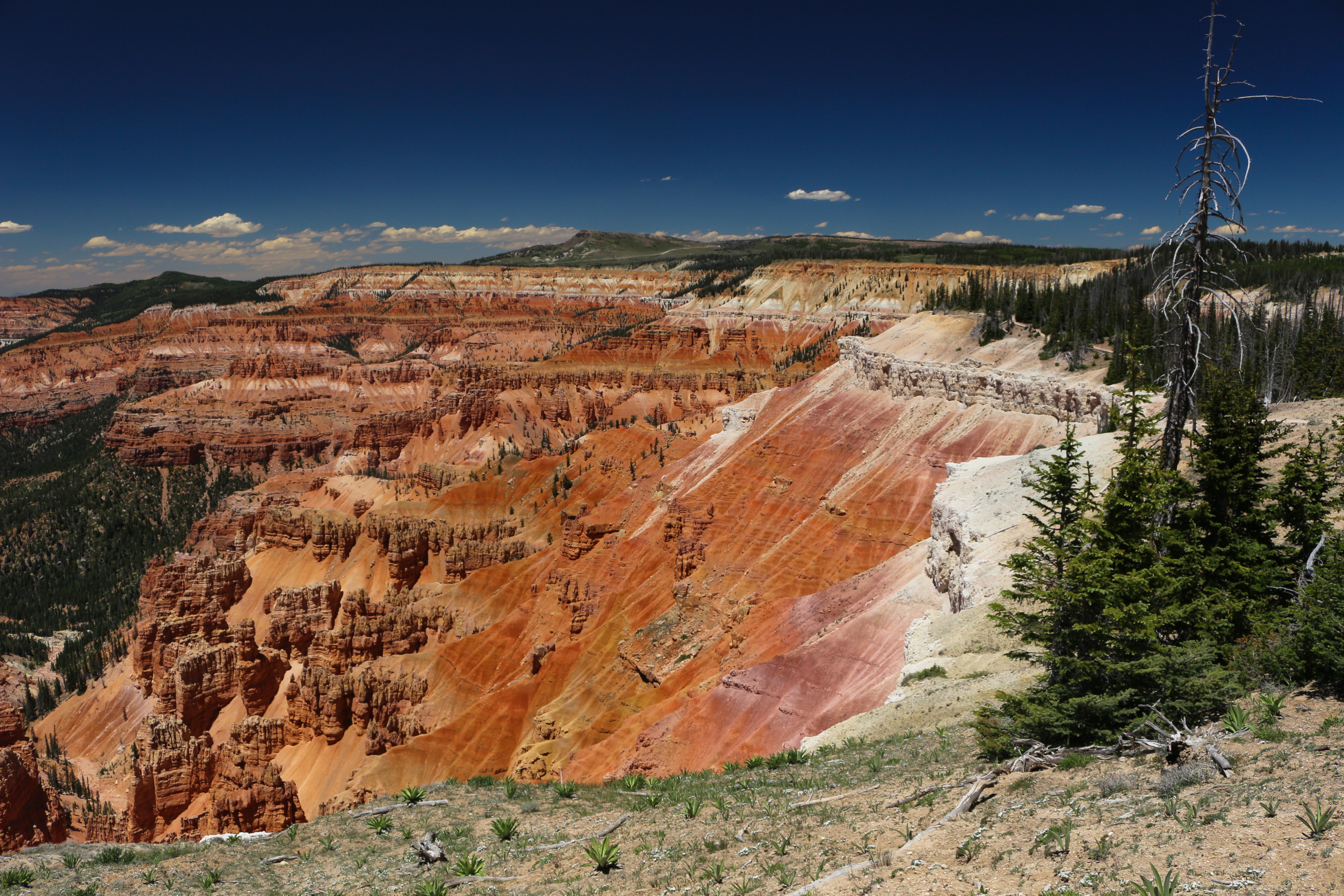
- Cedar Breaks amphitheater

- Location within Utah Location within the United States
- Interactive map of Cedar Breaks National Monument
- Location: Iron County, Utah, U.S.
- Coordinates: 37°38′33″N 112°50′56″W
- Area: 6,155 acres (24.91 km^{2})
- Created: August 22, 1933
- Visitors: 688,644 (in 2022)
- Governing body: National Park Service
- Website: Cedar Breaks National Monument

Cedar Breaks National Monument is a U.S. National Monument located in the U.S. state of Utah near Cedar City. Cedar Breaks is a natural amphitheater, stretching across 3 miles (4.8 km), with a depth of over 2,000 feet (610 m). The elevation of the rim of the amphitheater is over 10,000 feet (3,000 m) above sea level. Rising above the rim is the prominent Brian Head, the peak of which lies a short distance outside of the National Monument boundary.

The rock of the amphitheater is more eroded than, but otherwise similar to, formations at nearby Bryce Canyon National Park, Red Canyon in Dixie National Forest, and select areas of Cedar Mountain (SR-14). Because of its elevation, snow often makes parts of the park inaccessible to vehicles from October through May. Its rim visitor center is open from June through October. Several hundred thousand people visit the monument annually. The monument area is the headwaters of Mammoth Creek, a tributary of the Sevier River.

== Flora and fauna ==
Wildlife can often be seen in this high-altitude setting. Mule deer and porcupines are common, as are rodents and similar animals such as marmots, golden-mantled ground squirrels, pocket gophers, and chipmunks. Mountain lions and other larger animals live in the area but are seldom seen. Common birds include the Clark's nutcracker, violet-green swallows, and the common raven.

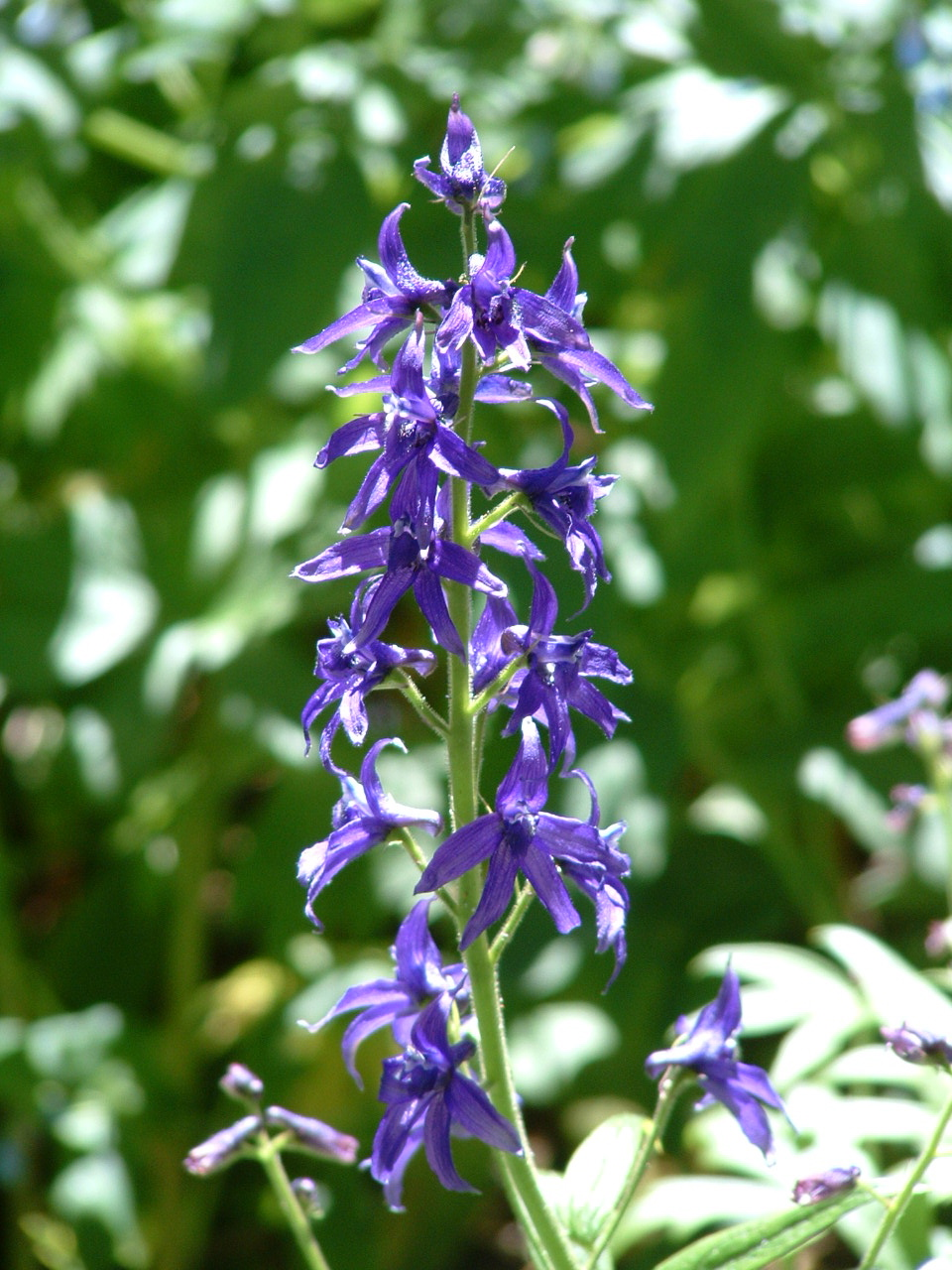
A Larkspur wildflower near the rim of Cedar Breaks.

The bristlecone pine, a species of tree that is known as the longest living single organism, can also be found in the high country, with some local specimens known to be more than 1600 years old. Subalpine meadows dot the canyon rim in such areas as Alpine Pond, which is an easy hike from the road along a clear trail. Aspen, Engelmann spruce, subalpine fir trees, and limber pine also grow here.

Spring begins in June at this elevation, when wildflowers cover the canyon rim. Wildflowers bloom all during the short growing season, and visitors can enjoy Colorado columbine, scarlet paintbrush, subalpine larkspur, pretty shooting star, orange sneezeweed, Panguitch buckwheat, prairie smoke, silvery lupin, yellow evening primrose, shrubby cinquefoil, Parry primrose, plantainleaf buttercup, and two species of Penstemon.

== History and geology ==
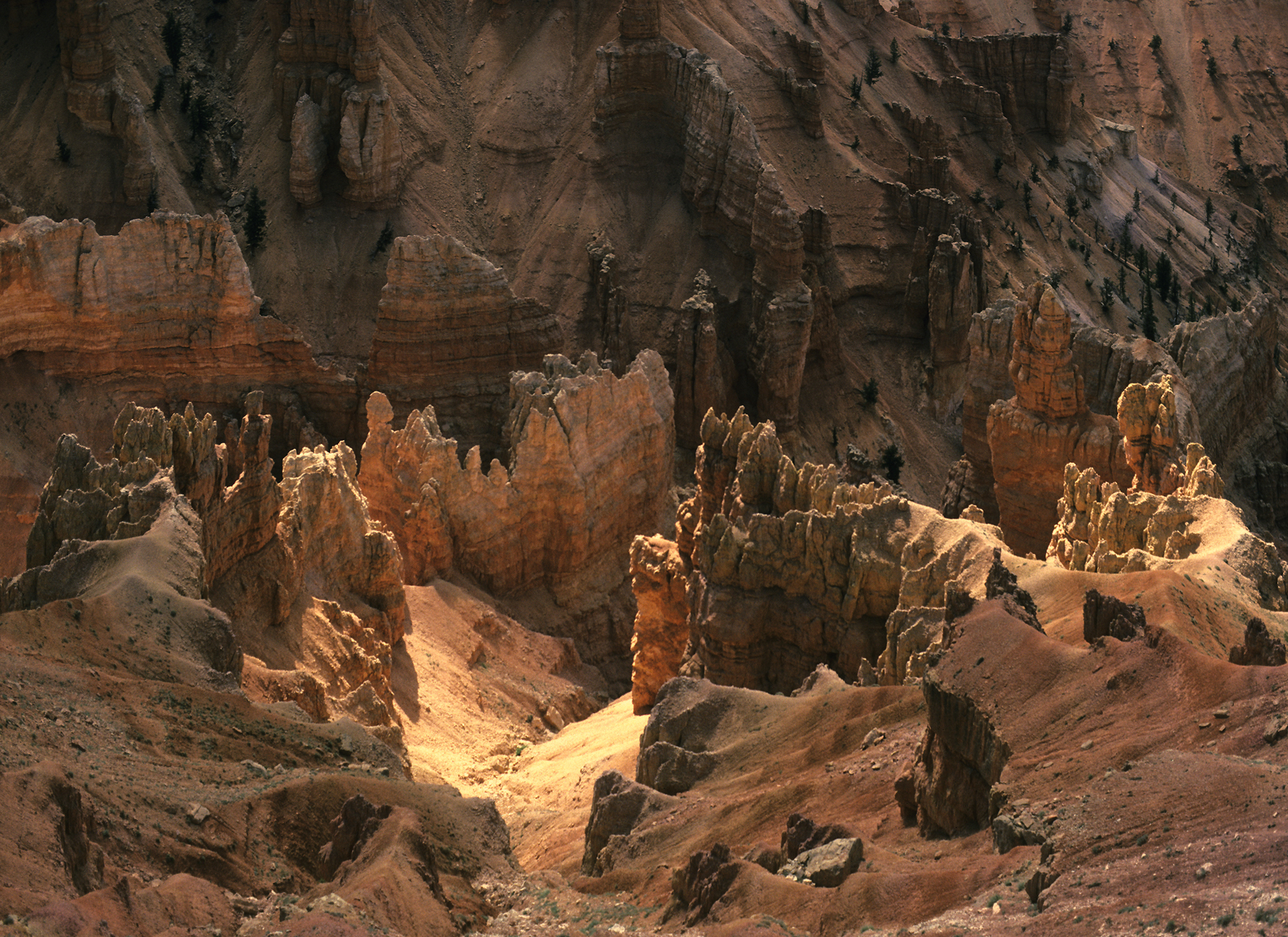
Hoodoos in Cedar Breaks

The amphitheater, located near the west end of the Colorado Plateau, covers the west side of the Markagunt Plateau, the same plateau that forms parts of Zion National Park. Uplift and erosion formed the canyon over millions of years, raising and then wearing away the shale, limestone, and sandstone that were deposited at the bottom of an ancient lake 70 by 250 miles (110 km × 400 km), known as Lake Claron, about 60 million years ago. It continues to erode at a pace of about 2 inches (50 mm) every 5 years. Atop the plateau, much of the area is covered by volcanic rock known as tuff, formed during cataclysmic eruptions around 35 million years ago.

The rocks of the eroded canyon contain iron and manganese in various combinations, providing brilliant colors that led Indians to call it the Circle of Painted Cliffs. Iron oxides provide the reds, oranges and yellows, while manganese oxides provide shades of purple. The color of the rock is soft and subtle compared to the hoodoos at Bryce Canyon.

The area is a form of badlands—canyons, spires, walls, and cliffs so steep and confusing that the land, while of great aesthetic value, is of little utilitarian worth. Early settlers called them badlands or breaks and created the current name by combining breaks with cedar for the many juniper trees (often incorrectly called cedars) that grow in the area.

Cedar Breaks National Monument was established in 1933. A small lodge designed by Gilbert Stanley Underwood and built and operated by the Utah Parks Company once existed near the south end of the monument, but it was razed in 1972. The Cedar Breaks Lodge was the smallest of the park lodges in the Southwest. It was deemed "uneconomical to operate" by the Park Service, but protests associated with its demolition caused the Park Service to re-examine its policies concerning lodges in other parks, contributing to their preservation.

== Climate ==
According to the Köppen climate classification, the area has a dry-summer subalpine climate (Dsc).

Climate data for Blowhard Mountain Radar, Utah, 1991–2020 normals, 1964-2020 extremes: 10694ft (3260m)
Month	Jan	Feb	Mar	Apr	May	Jun	Jul	Aug	Sep	Oct	Nov	Dec	Year
Record high °F (°C)	55 (13)	54 (12)	65 (18)	65 (18)	79 (26)	80 (27)	90 (32)	82 (28)	75 (24)	74 (23)	63 (17)	54 (12)	90 (32)
Mean daily maximum °F (°C)	31.1 (−0.5)	31.1 (−0.5)	34.5 (1.4)	38.1 (3.4)	46.8 (8.2)	60.3 (15.7)	67.6 (19.8)	66.1 (18.9)	57.8 (14.3)	47.8 (8.8)	38.1 (3.4)	29.7 (−1.3)	45.8 (7.6)
Daily mean °F (°C)	22.7 (−5.2)	24.2 (−4.3)	27.5 (−2.5)	30.4 (−0.9)	39.7 (4.3)	50.9 (10.5)	59.2 (15.1)	56.9 (13.8)	49.9 (9.9)	39.6 (4.2)	29.7 (−1.3)	22.3 (−5.4)	37.8 (3.2)
Mean daily minimum °F (°C)	14.3 (−9.8)	17.4 (−8.1)	20.4 (−6.4)	22.7 (−5.2)	32.5 (0.3)	41.5 (5.3)	50.8 (10.4)	47.8 (8.8)	42.0 (5.6)	31.5 (−0.3)	21.2 (−6.0)	14.8 (−9.6)	29.7 (−1.2)
Record low °F (°C)	−20 (−29)	−18 (−28)	−13 (−25)	−4 (−20)	−1 (−18)	16 (−9)	29 (−2)	23 (−5)	13 (−11)	−3 (−19)	−11 (−24)	−23 (−31)	−23 (−31)
Average precipitation inches (mm)	2.87 (73)	3.55 (90)	4.07 (103)	2.55 (65)	1.46 (37)	0.70 (18)	2.56 (65)	2.76 (70)	1.76 (45)	2.05 (52)	2.46 (62)	2.52 (64)	29.31 (744)
Average snowfall inches (cm)	37.50 (95.3)	40.10 (101.9)	44.60 (113.3)	28.10 (71.4)	11.70 (29.7)	3.40 (8.6)	0.00 (0.00)	0.00 (0.00)	2.00 (5.1)	15.70 (39.9)	30.90 (78.5)	32.60 (82.8)	246.6 (626.5)
Source 1: NOAA (1981-2010 precipitation & snowfall)
Source 2: XMACIS2 (records & monthly max/mins)

== Attractions ==
There are two well-advertised hiking trails in the monument, and a campsite near the canyon rim. Trails range from .6 to 5 miles from easy to moderately strenuous.

== National park proposal ==
In 2006, Iron County officials considered a proposal for legislation to expand the monument and rename it Cedar Breaks National Park. The new park would include the adjacent Ashdown Gorge Wilderness, some private land and nearby Flanigan Arch.

== Gallery ==
Cedar Breaks

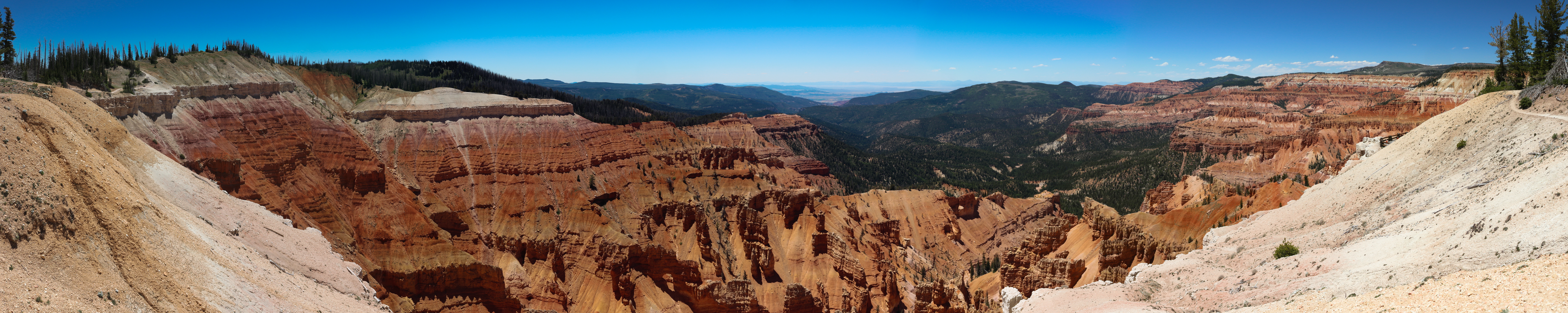
Panoramic view from the canyon rim

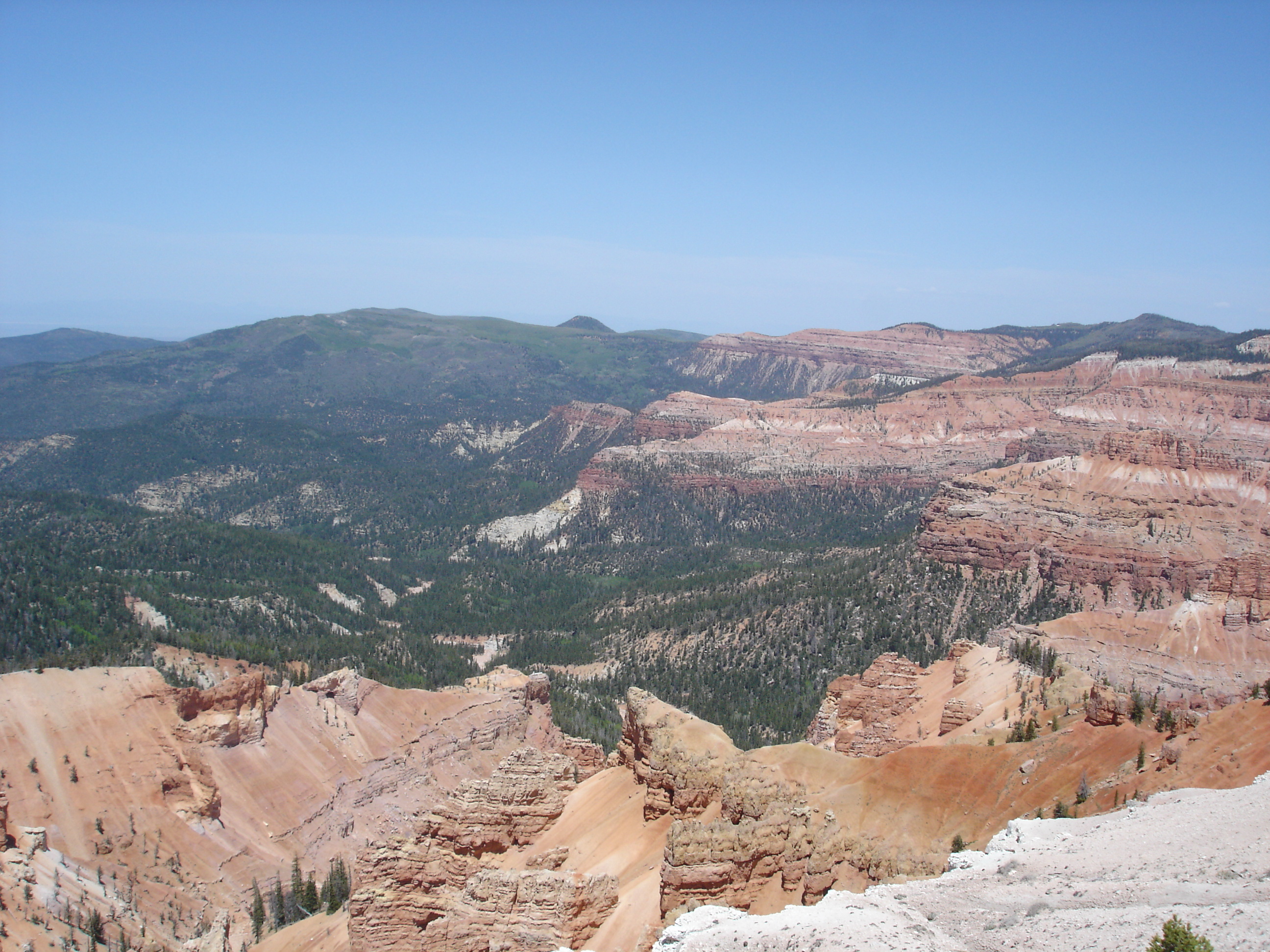
View from the canyon rim.

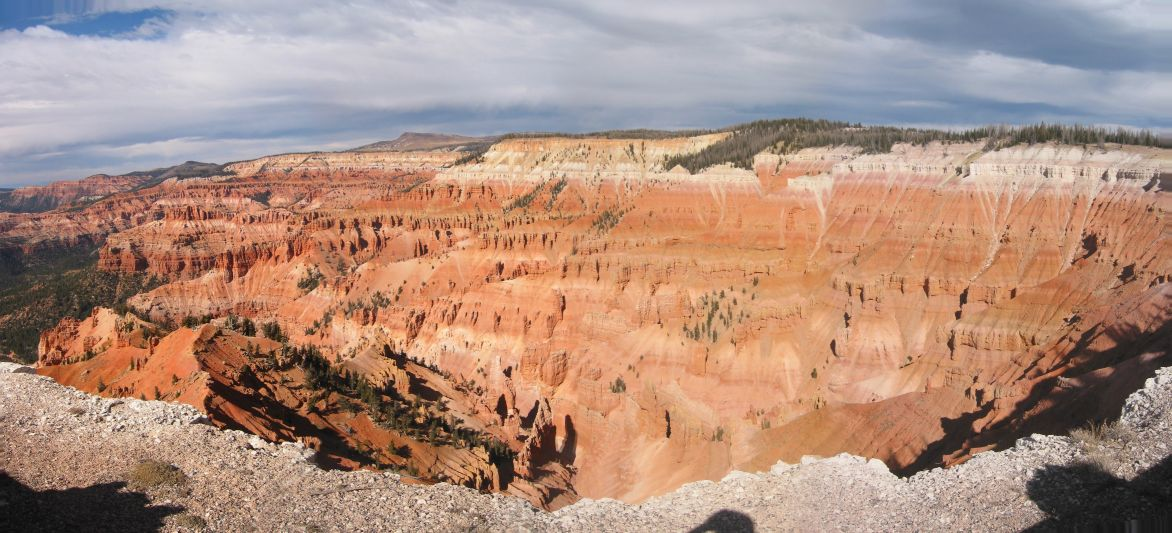
Cedar Breaks looking northeast from the canyon rim.

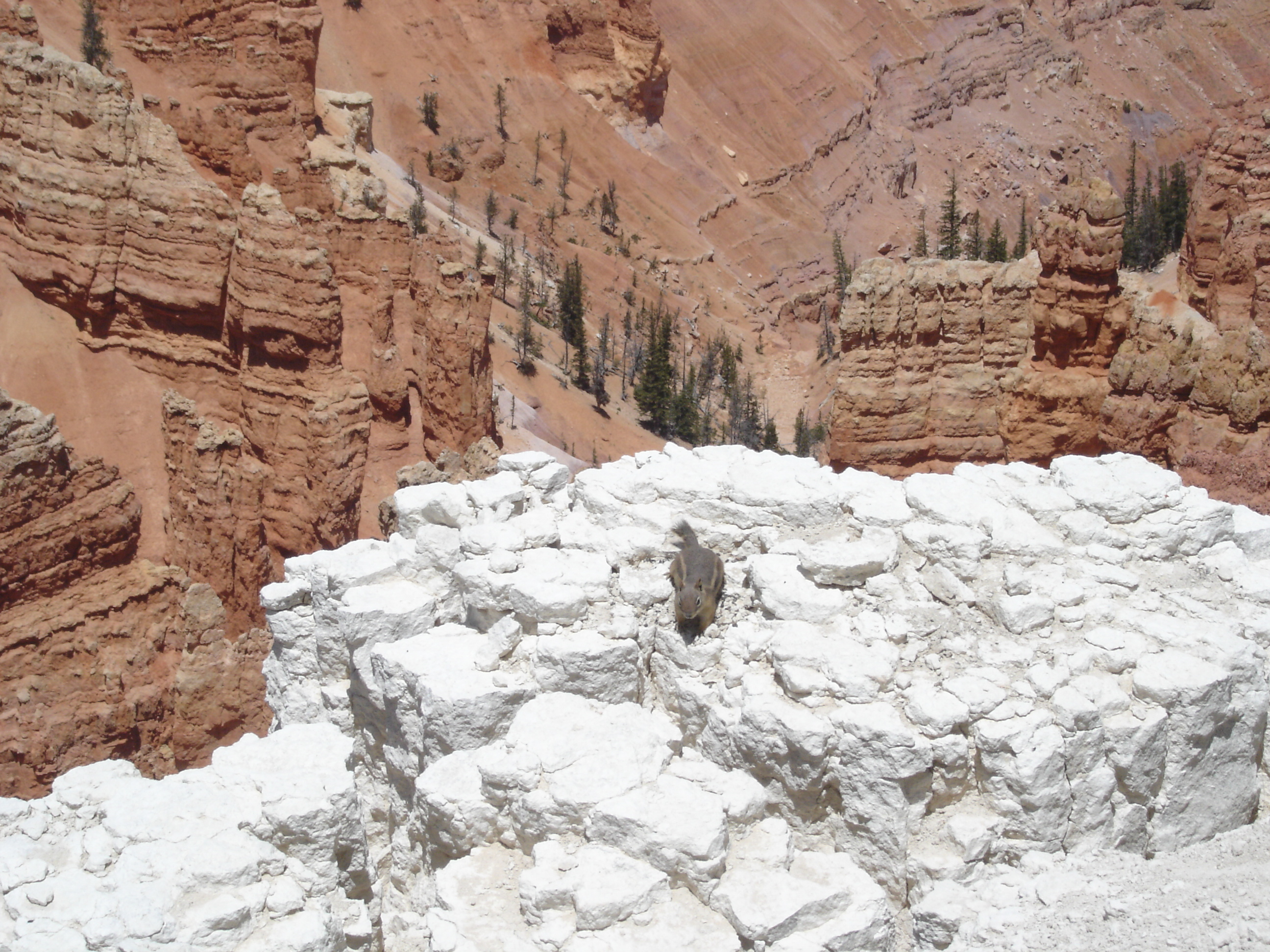
Golden-mantled ground squirrel on the limestone canyon rim

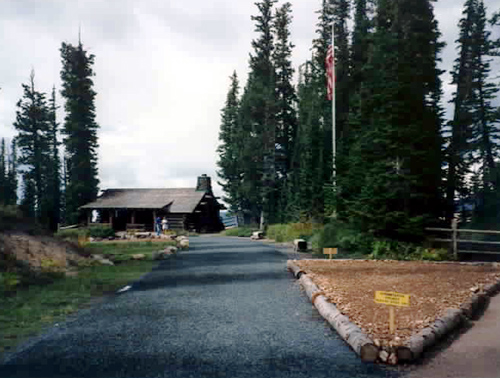
The canyon-rim visitor center at 10,350 feet (3,150 m) is open 5 months of the year.

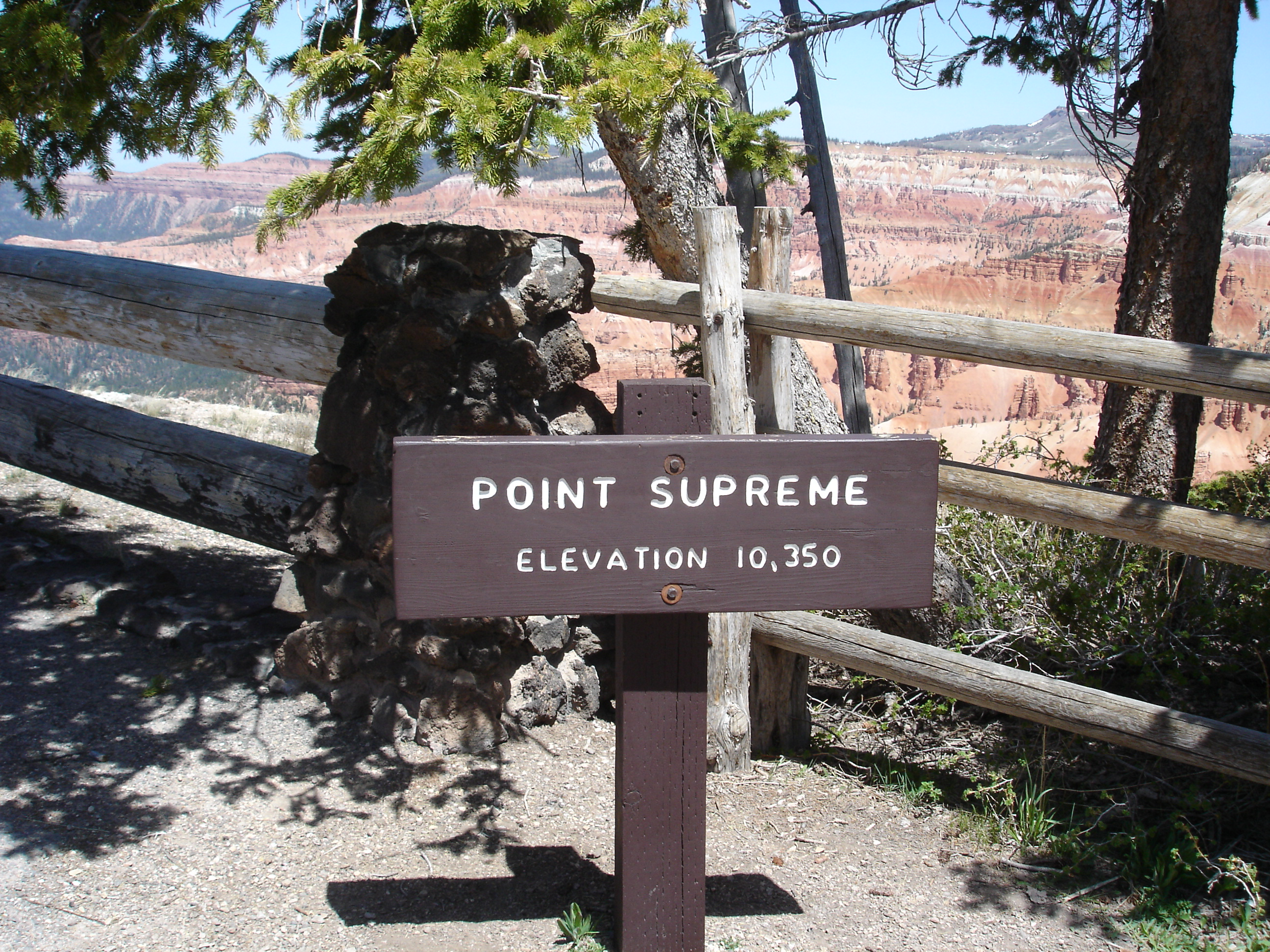
Point Supreme

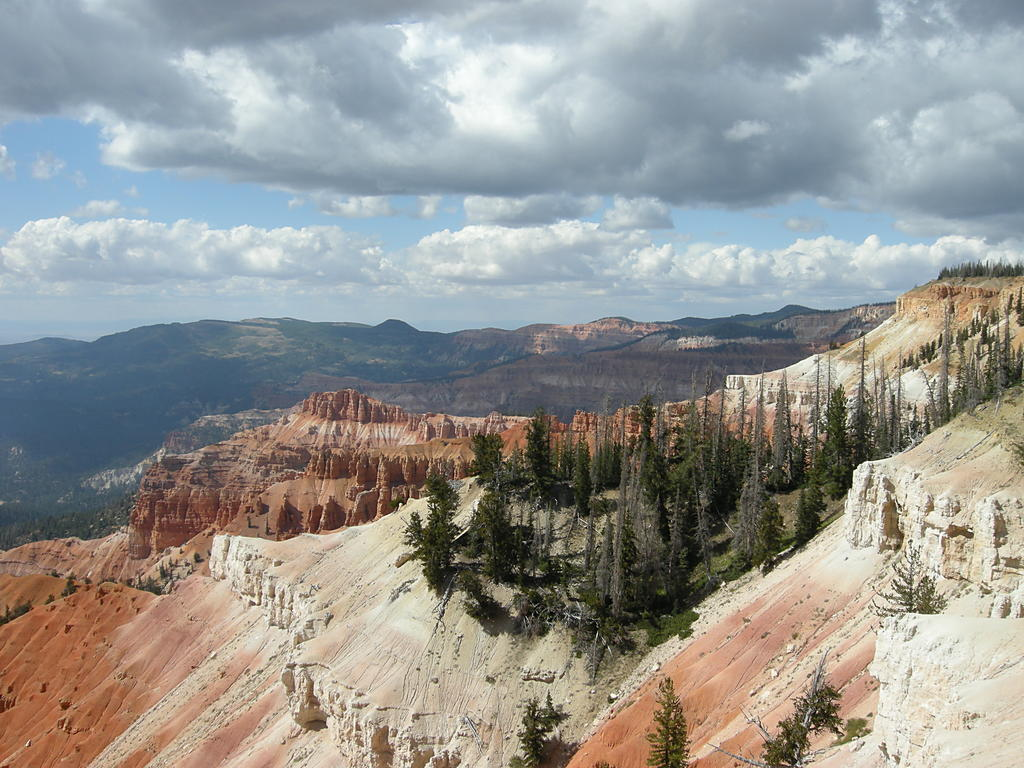
Cloudy day in September 2008

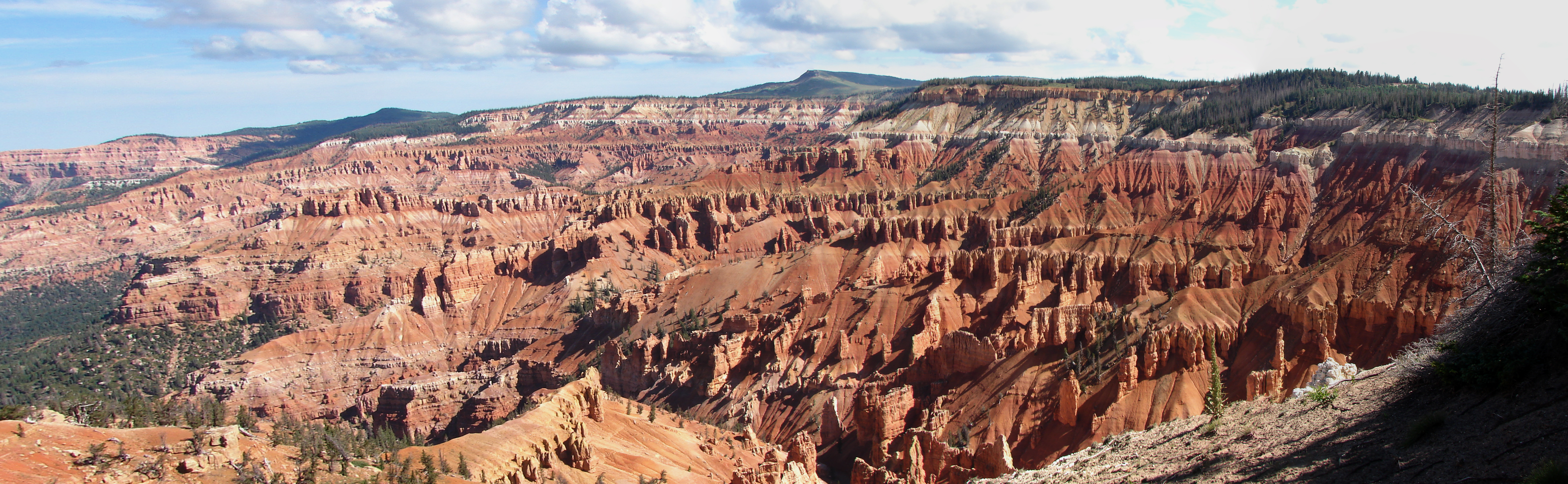
Panorama of Cedar Breaks National Monument.

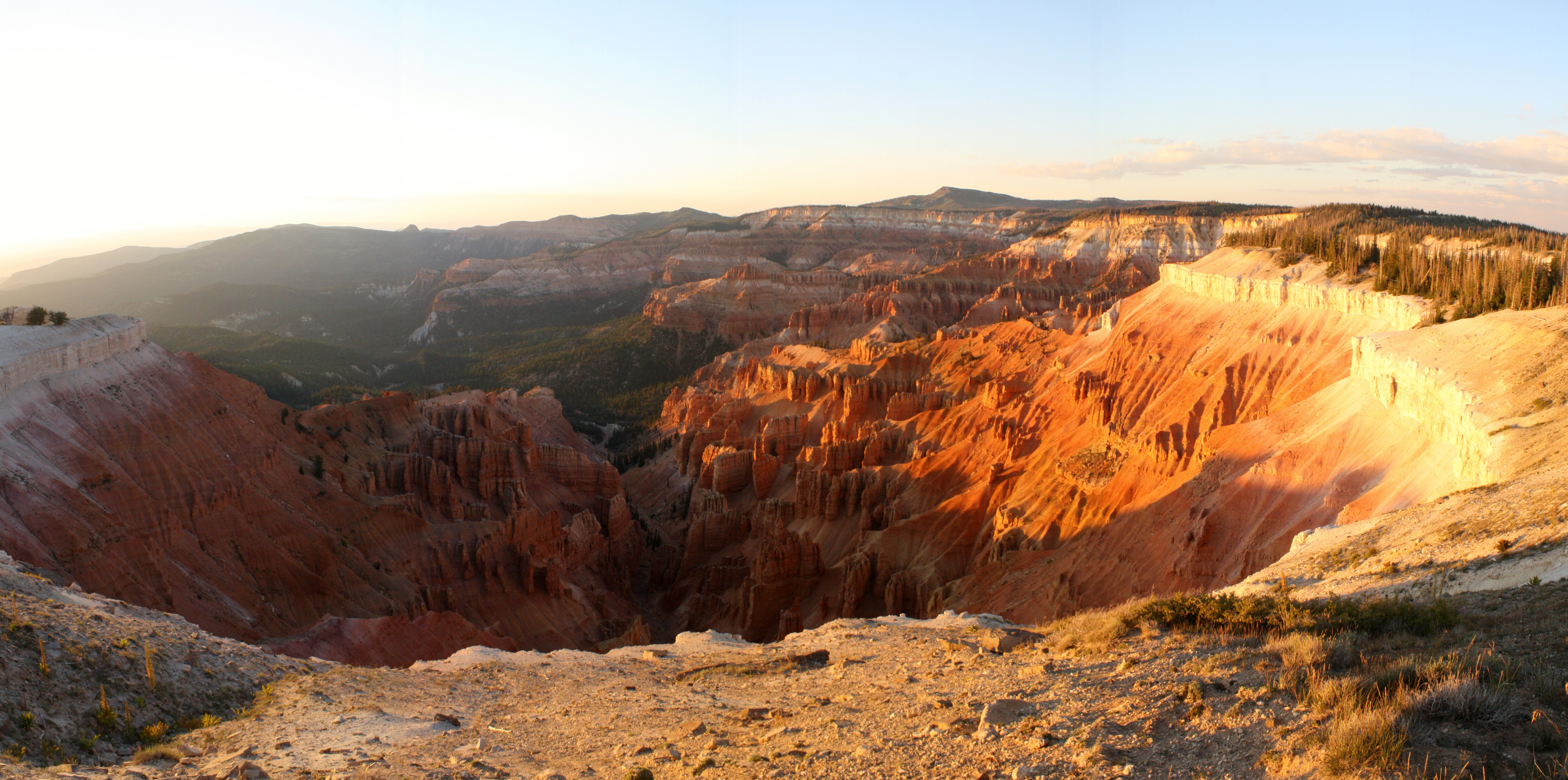
Panoramic view of Cedar Breaks National Monument to the north during sunset.

Cedar Breaks from Point Supreme at sunset

Hoodoos at Cedar Breaks from Point Supreme at sunset

== See also ==
- List of national monuments of the United States
- Panguitch Lake
- Dixie National Forest
