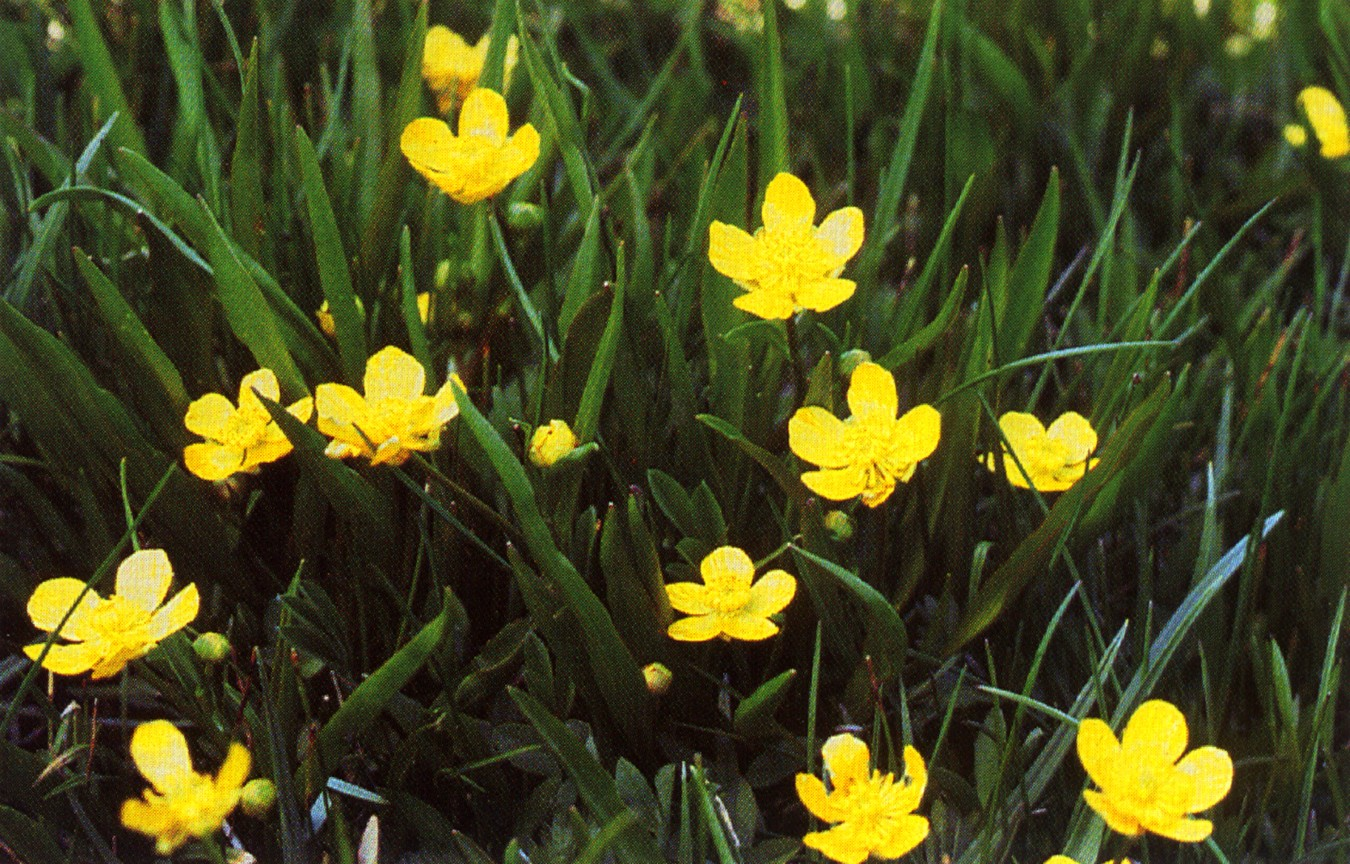

Scientific classification
- Kingdom: Plantae
- Clade: Tracheophytes
- Clade: Angiosperms
- Clade: Eudicots
- Order: Ranunculales
- Family: Ranunculaceae
- Genus: Ranunculus
- Species: R. alismifolius

Binomial name
- Ranunculus alismifolius Geyer ex Benth.

= Ranunculus alismifolius =

Species of buttercup

Ranunculus alismifolius is a species of buttercup known by the common name plantainleaf buttercup. It is native to western North America from British Columbia to California to Colorado, where it grows in moist mountain habitat such as meadows, streambanks, and bogs, becoming common to abundant in some places. It is somewhat variable in appearance and there are several varieties which can be hard to tell apart. In general the plant is a perennial herb producing a few usually upright to erect, branching stems from a fleshy, fibrous root system. It can be up to half a meter tall, or it can remain quite short and clumpy. The leaves vary in shape, the lower ones with oval blades and the upper linear to lance-shaped, all borne on long petioles. The inflorescence bears one or more flowers, each on a long pedicel. The flower has up to 12 yellow petals and many yellow stamens and pistils at the center. The fruit is an achene, borne in a spherical cluster of 12 or more.
