= Paragonah, Utah =

Town in the state of Utah, United States

- Town
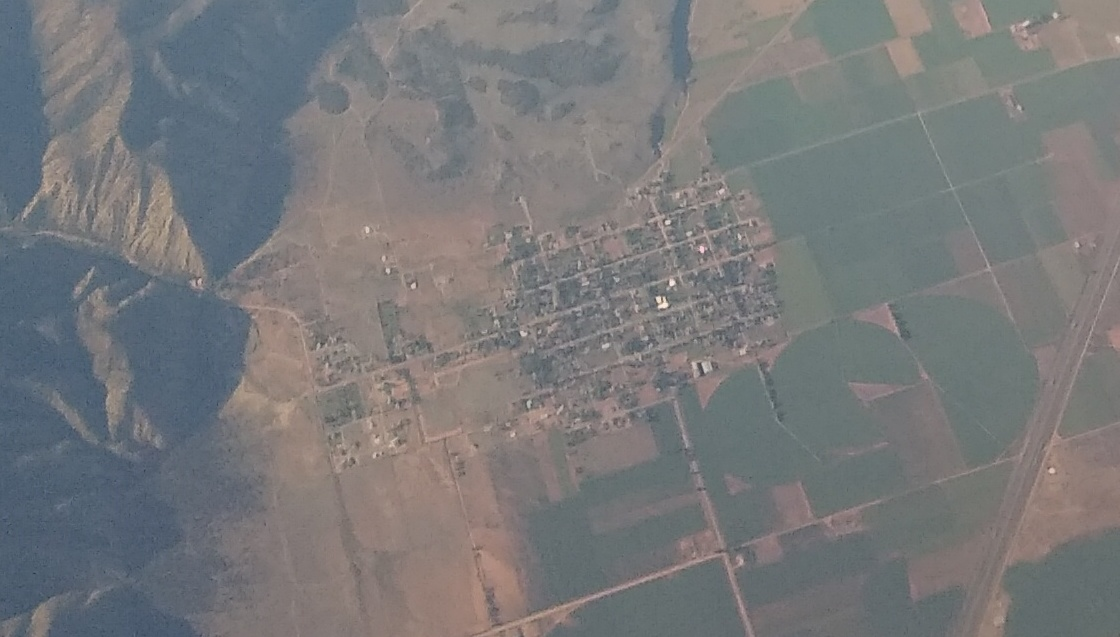
- Aerial view of the town

- Location in Iron County and the state of Utah
- Coordinates: 37°53′07″N 112°46′16″W
- Country: United States
- State: Utah
- County: Iron
- Founded: 1851
- Incorporated: April 3, 1916
- Named for: Southern Paiute for the Little Salt Lake

Area
  - Total: 0.67 sq mi (1.74 km^{2})
  - Land: 0.67 sq mi (1.74 km^{2})
  - Water: 0 sq mi (0.00 km^{2})
- Elevation: 5,903 ft (1,799 m)

Population (2020)
  - Total: 536
  - Density: 809.4/sq mi (312.53/km^{2})
- Time zone: UTC-7 (Mountain (MST))
  - Summer (DST): UTC-6 (MDT)
- ZIP code: 84760
- Area code: 435
- FIPS code: 49-57960
- GNIS feature ID: 2413115
- Website: paragonahtown.gov

Paragonah (/ˌpærəˈɡuːnə/ PARR-ə-GOO-nə) is a town in Iron County, Utah, United States. The population was 536 at the 2020 census.

== Demographics ==
Historical population
Census	Pop.	Note	%±
1860	121		—
1870	211		74.4%
1880	256		21.3%
1890	268		4.7%
1900	358		33.6%
1910	399		11.5%
1920	449		12.5%
1930	384		−14.5%
1940	365		−4.9%
1950	404		10.7%
1960	300		−25.7%
1970	275		−8.3%
1980	310		12.7%
1990	307		−1.0%
2000	470		53.1%
2010	488		3.8%
2020	536		9.8%
U.S. Decennial Census

As of the census of 2000, there were 470 people, 156 households, and 122 families residing in the town. The population density was 810.2 people per square mile (312.9/km^{2}). There were 197 housing units at an average density of 339.6 per square mile (131.1/km^{2}). The racial makeup of the town was 98.09% White, 0.21% African American, 0.21% Native American, 0.21% Pacific Islander, 0.64% from other races, and 0.64% from two or more races. Hispanic or Latino of any race were 1.49% of the population.

There were 156 households, out of which 37.8% had children under the age of 18 living with them, 71.8% were married couples living together, 5.1% had a female householder with no husband present, and 21.2% were non-families.19.9% of all households were made up of individuals, and 12.2% had someone living alone who was 65 years of age or older. The average household size was 3.01, and the average family size was 3.52.

In the town, the population was spread out, with 33.8% under the age of 18, 8.3% from 18 to 24, 22.1% from 25 to 44, 20.9% from 45 to 64, and 14.9% who were 65 years of age or older. The median age was 34 years. For every 100 females, there were 101.7 males. For every 100 females age 18 and over, there were 96.8 males.

The median income for a household in the town was $33,958, and the median income for a family was $37,083. Males had a median income of $25,208 versus $21,563 for females. The per capita income for the town was $11,352. About 8.8% of families and 13.9% of the population were below the poverty line, including 17.2% of those under age 18 and none of those age 65 or over.

== Geography ==
Paragonah is in northeastern Iron County, 4 miles (6 km) northeast of Parowan, the county seat. Interstate 15 passes northwest of the town, with access from Exit 82. Parogonah is 23 miles (37 km) northeast of Cedar City and 228 miles (367 km) south of Salt Lake City. According to the United States Census Bureau, the town has a total area of 0.64 square miles (1.66 km^{2}), all land.

== History ==
Paragonah was settled by residents from the nearby town of Parowan in the early 1850s. Parowan residents found meadows next to Red Creek that provided ideal locations for farming. The settlement was first known as Red Creek, but the name was later changed to Paragoonah and then Paragonah. There are conflicting sources as to the name's precise meaning, but it is of Southern Paiute origin and apparently is a reference to the red color of the water found in the area. Paragonah was incorporated as a town in 1916.

== See also ==
- List of cities and towns in Utah

== Sources ==
- Seegmiller, Janet Burton, A History of Iron County (1998)
