= Parowan, Utah =

City in Utah, United States

- City
- Parowan's Mormon Pioneer-era Rock Church
- Nickname: "Mother Town of Southern Utah"
- Location in Iron County and the state of Utah
- Coordinates: 37°50′01″N 112°51′42″W
- Country: United States
- State: Utah
- County: Iron
- Incorporated: February 6, 1851

Area
  - Total: 6.89 sq mi (17.85 km^{2})
  - Land: 6.89 sq mi (17.85 km^{2})
  - Water: 0 sq mi (0.00 km^{2})
- Elevation: 6,155 ft (1,876 m)

Population (2020)
  - Total: 2,996
  - Density: 459.2/sq mi (177.29/km^{2})
- Time zone: UTC-7 (Mountain (MST))
  - Summer (DST): UTC-6 (MDT)
- ZIP code: 84761
- Area code: 435
- FIPS code: 49-58510
- GNIS feature ID: 2411378
- Website: www.parowan.gov

Parowan (/ˈpærəwɑːn/ PARR-ə-wahn) is a city in and the county seat of Iron County, Utah, United States. The population was 2,996 at the 2020 census.

Parowan became the first incorporated city in Iron County in 1851. A fort that had been constructed on the east side of Center Creek the previous year was an initial hub in the development of ironworks in the region. Parowan served as the agricultural support base for the local iron industry, whose blast furnace was located in nearby Cedar City. Eventually, the ironworks were decommissioned.

Despite occasional successes, the mission failed to produce a consistent and sustained supply of pig iron. By 1858, most of the area's mining operations had ceased due to disappointing yields. Today, the area's chief industries are recreation and tourism.

== History ==
Fremont culture and Anasazi people were the first known inhabitants of the area where Parowan now exists. Petroglyphs, pithouses, arrowheads, pottery, and manos dating from A.D. 750 to 1250 found in the area are evidence that it was on a major thoroughfare of early indigenous peoples. At Parowan Gap, a mountain pass 10 miles (16 km) northwest of Parowan, ancient people inscribed petroglyphs on smooth-surfaced boulders that feature snakes, lizards, mouse-men, bear claws, and mountain sheep. Located near the Parowan Gap there are dinosaur tracks. East of the Gap and petroglyphs hikers can discover Hadrosaurs tracks that were originally formed in non-resistant mudstone. The tracks have three toes and can be found on the side of 12800 N. Later, the Old Spanish Trail passed through the area.

Parowan was founded on January 13, 1851, twelve months after Parley P. Pratt and members of his exploring party discovered the Little Salt Lake Valley and nearby deposits of iron ore in the Iron Mountain District. On January 8, 1850, Pratt had raised a liberty pole at Heap's Spring and dedicated the site as "The City of Little Salt Lake". Based on Pratt's exploration report, Brigham Young called for the establishment of settlements in the area to produce much-needed iron implements for the pioneer state.

Mormon apostle George A. Smith was appointed to head the establishment of this "Iron Mission" in 1850. The first company of 120 men, 31 women, and 18 children braved winter weather traveling south from Provo during December. They sometimes built roads and bridges as they traveled, and they finally reached Center Creek on January 13, 1851. After enduring two bitterly cold nights, they moved across the creek and circled their wagons by Heap's Spring and Pratt's liberty pole, seeking the protection of the hills. Within days, the settlement organization was completed: companies of men were dispatched to build a road up the canyon, a town site was surveyed and laid into lots, and a fort and a log council house were begun. The council house was used as church, schoolhouse, theater, and community recreation center for many years.

In 1861 construction was begun on a large church building to stand in the center of the public square. The pioneers envisioned a building of three stories, built from the abundant yellow sandstone and massive timbers in nearby canyons. Known as the "Old Rock Church", the building was completed in 1867 and served as a place of worship, town council hall, school building, social hall, and tourist camp. In 1939 it was restored through the efforts of the Daughters of Utah Pioneers and a Parowan-sponsored WPA project. It is now a museum of Parowan's early history.

Parowan has been called the "Mother Town of the Southwest" because of the many pioneers who left from there to start other communities in southern Utah, Nevada, Arizona, Colorado, and even Oregon and Wyoming. In its first year, colonists were asked to settle Johnson Fort, now Enoch, where a stockade was built, and were also sent to settle along Coal Creek, site of the settlement to manufacture iron which became Cedar City.

Parowan's first settlers were instructed to plant crops so that following immigrants could open up the coal and iron ore deposits, but local industries were also developed. Self-sufficiency was envisioned, and local industries included a tannery, sawmill, cotton mill, and factories for making saddles and harnesses, furniture and cabinets, shoes, and guns; there also were carpentry and blacksmith shops. In the early 1900s sheep and dairy industries were well established. Local farms were noted for their quality Rambouillet sheep, and the Southern Utah Dairy Company, a cooperative venture begun in 1900, produced dairy products and was known for its "Pardale Cheese".

The first attempts at iron manufacturing were unsuccessful, but mining in the twentieth century brought prosperity to Iron County. When the closure of the mines and the completion of Interstate 15 threatened economic depression in the early 1980s, Parowan citizens developed an economic plan to keep the community viable. Businesses now support Brian Head, a year-round resort 12 miles (19 km) south of town featuring downhill and cross-country skiing in the winter and numerous summer mountain activities.

Significant growth has occurred in the 1990s in Parowan; it has been attributed to affordable utility fees and a positive economic climate. Parowan is the site of the annual Iron County Fair on Labor Day weekend; it also is a host community for the Utah Summer Games and sponsor of the annual "Christmas in the Country" celebration each November.

In 1993 the city began development of Heritage Park. This site includes a park, a grotto and pond, and statues commemorating the founders of Parowan. Other local historic sites include the original town square with the Old Rock Church, the War Memorial and Rose Garden, the Third/Fourth Ward LDS chapel built in 1915, and the Jesse N. Smith Home Museum. Parowan City supports the Parowan Community Theatre, which produces theatrical productions throughout the year.

== Geography ==
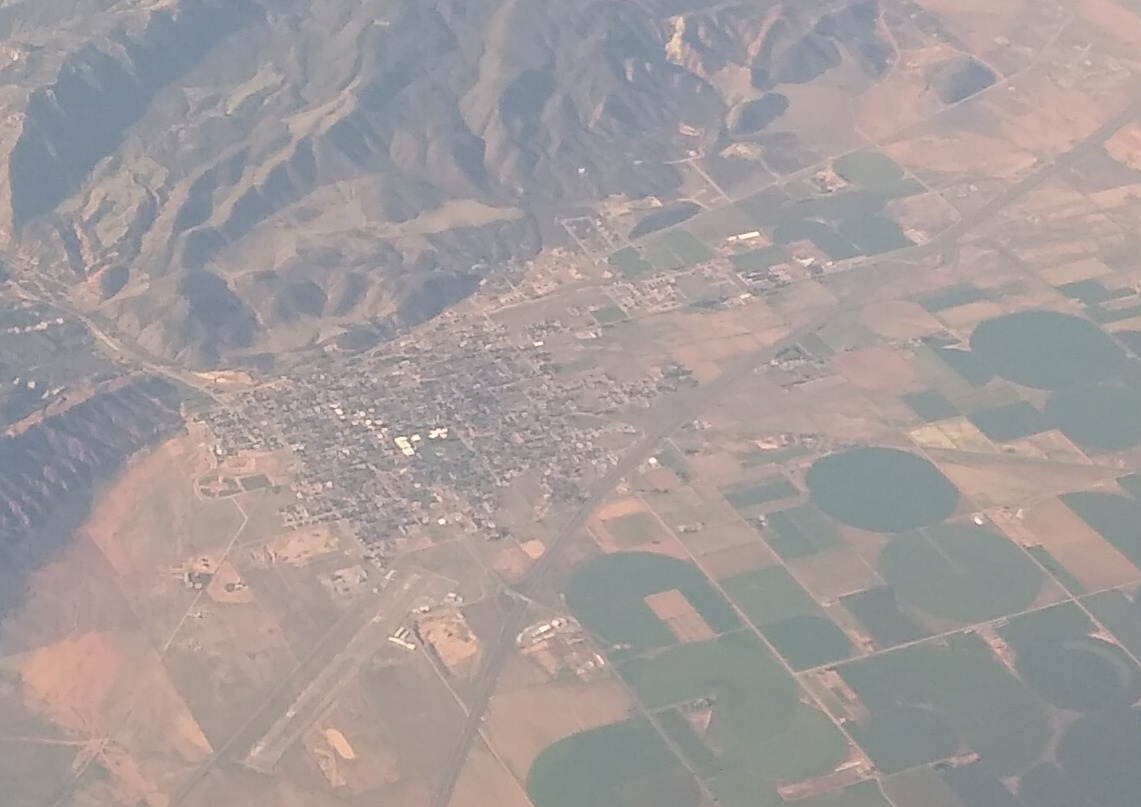
Aerial view of Parowan

Parowan sits on the southeastern edge of Parowan Valley, at the mouth of Parowan Canyon. A distinct red-top mountain known as Valentine Peak (8,050 ft or 2,450 m) overlooks the valley and is used as a common landmark for the city.

Interstate 15 runs along the northwestern edge of the city, with access from Exits 75 and 78. I-15 leads north 58 miles (93 km) to Cove Fort and Interstate 70, and southwest 19 miles (31 km) to Cedar City. Utah State Route 143 leads south up Parowan Canyon 16 miles (26 km) to Cedar Breaks National Monument.

According to the United States Census Bureau, the city has a total area of 6.6 square miles (17.2 km^{2}), all land.

=== Climate ===
Parowan has a cold semi-arid climate (Köppen BSk). The data below are from the Western Regional Climate Center for the period from 1893 to 2010.

Climate data for Parowan Power Plant, UT
Month	Jan	Feb	Mar	Apr	May	Jun	Jul	Aug	Sep	Oct	Nov	Dec	Year
Record high °F (°C)	68 (20)	74 (23)	77 (25)	88 (31)	92 (33)	99 (37)	102 (39)	100 (38)	95 (35)	89 (32)	79 (26)	70 (21)	102 (39)
Mean daily maximum °F (°C)	42.0 (5.6)	45.9 (7.7)	52.9 (11.6)	61.7 (16.5)	70.9 (21.6)	81.7 (27.6)	87.5 (30.8)	85.5 (29.7)	78.3 (25.7)	66.6 (19.2)	53.3 (11.8)	43.5 (6.4)	64.1 (17.8)
Mean daily minimum °F (°C)	15.6 (−9.1)	19.7 (−6.8)	25.4 (−3.7)	32.0 (0.0)	39.7 (4.3)	47.7 (8.7)	55.0 (12.8)	53.7 (12.1)	45.0 (7.2)	34.2 (1.2)	24.2 (−4.3)	17.3 (−8.2)	34.1 (1.2)
Record low °F (°C)	−27 (−33)	−23 (−31)	−2 (−19)	2 (−17)	17 (−8)	22 (−6)	29 (−2)	33 (1)	19 (−7)	−2 (−19)	−9 (−23)	−22 (−30)	−27 (−33)
Average precipitation inches (mm)	0.87 (22)	1.10 (28)	1.38 (35)	1.17 (30)	0.88 (22)	0.53 (13)	1.11 (28)	1.37 (35)	0.83 (21)	1.06 (27)	0.99 (25)	0.88 (22)	12.17 (308)
Average snowfall inches (cm)	11.1 (28)	11.0 (28)	10.7 (27)	4.6 (12)	1.0 (2.5)	0 (0)	0 (0)	0 (0)	0 (0)	1.5 (3.8)	7.3 (19)	10.2 (26)	57.4 (146.3)
Source: https://wrcc.dri.edu/cgi-bin/cliMAIN.pl?ut6686

== Demographics ==
Historical population
Census	Pop.	Note	%±
1860	526		—
1870	861		63.7%
1880	957		11.1%
1890	937		−2.1%
1900	1,039		10.9%
1910	1,156		11.3%
1920	1,641		42.0%
1930	1,474		−10.2%
1940	1,525		3.5%
1950	1,455		−4.6%
1960	1,486		2.1%
1970	1,423		−4.2%
1980	1,836		29.0%
1990	1,873		2.0%
2000	2,565		36.9%
2010	2,790		8.8%
2020	2,996		7.4%
U.S. Decennial Census

=== 2020 census ===
As of the 2020 census, Parowan had a population of 2,996. The median age was 42.1 years. 26.1% of residents were under the age of 18 and 24.6% of residents were 65 years of age or older. For every 100 females there were 100.9 males, and for every 100 females age 18 and over there were 98.5 males age 18 and over.

0.0% of residents lived in urban areas, while 100.0% lived in rural areas.

There were 1,139 households in Parowan, of which 31.3% had children under the age of 18 living in them. Of all households, 58.2% were married-couple households, 15.9% were households with a male householder and no spouse or partner present, and 21.4% were households with a female householder and no spouse or partner present. About 24.4% of all households were made up of individuals and 15.9% had someone living alone who was 65 years of age or older.

There were 1,407 housing units, of which 19.0% were vacant. The homeowner vacancy rate was 2.2% and the rental vacancy rate was 4.1%.

Racial composition as of the 2020 census
Race	Number	Percent
White	2,780	92.8%
Black or African American	1	0.0%
American Indian and Alaska Native	12	0.4%
Asian	13	0.4%
Native Hawaiian and Other Pacific Islander	4	0.1%
Some other race	64	2.1%
Two or more races	122	4.1%
Hispanic or Latino (of any race)	202	6.7%

=== 2000 census ===
As of the 2000 census, there were 2,565 people, 893 households, and 682 families residing in the city. The population density was 439.2 people per square mile (169.6/km^{2}). There were 1,230 housing units at an average density of 210.6 per square mile (81.3/km^{2}). The racial makeup of the city was 96.41% White, 0.39% Native American, 0.12% Asian, 0.16% Pacific Islander, 1.79% from other races, and 1.13% from two or more races. Hispanic or Latino of any race were 3.16% of the population.

There were 893 households, out of which 37.2% had children under the age of 18 living with them, 65.6% were married couples living together, 6.9% had a female householder with no husband present, and 23.6% were non-families. 21.3% of all households were made up of individuals, and 11.6% had someone living alone who was 65 years of age or older. The average household size was 2.84 and the average family size was 3.33.

In the city, the population was spread out, with 31.2% under the age of 18, 8.5% from 18 to 24, 21.9% from 25 to 44, 20.3% from 45 to 64, and 18.2% who were 65 years of age or older. The median age was 36 years. For every 100 females, there were 98.1 males. For every 100 females age 18 and over, there were 92.0 males.

The median income for a household in the city was $32,426, and the median income for a family was $36,548. Males had a median income of $30,170 versus $17,036 for females. The per capita income for the city was $14,859. About 7.8% of families and 11.0% of the population were below the poverty line, including 15.4% of those under age 18 and 5.2% of those age 65 or over.

== Notable people ==
- Texas Rose Bascom (1922-1993), rodeo trick rider and Hollywood actress, hall of fame inductee
- Scott M. Matheson - Governor of Utah from 1977 to 1985.
- Alma Richards - Utah's first Olympic gold medalist.
- Jesse N. Smith - Mormon pioneer who helped settle Parowan, mayor of Parowan from 1859 to 1860.
