= Strawberry (disambiguation) =

Strawberry is commonly the cultivated garden strawberry, Fragaria × ananassa.

Strawberry or Strawberries may also refer to:

- Fragaria, the strawberry genus, or any of its species
- Mock strawberry, the plant Potentilla indica

== Places ==
- Strawberry, Arizona, U.S.
- Strawberry, Arkansas, U.S.
- Strawberry, El Dorado County, California, U.S.
- Strawberry, Marin County, California, U.S.
- Strawberry, Tuolumne County, California, U.S.
- Strawberry, Nevada, U.S., a ghost town
- Strawberry, South Carolina, U.S.
- Strawberry, Utah, U.S.
- Strawberry Cirque, Antarctica
- Strawberry Crater, Arizona, U.S.
- Strawberry Creek, Berkeley, California, U.S.
- Strawberry Field, a former children's home in Liverpool, England
- Strawberry Gardens, a public house in Stockport, Greater Manchester, England
- Strawberry Hill (disambiguation), several places
- Strawberry Island (Deception Pass, Washington), Island County, Washington, U.S.
- Strawberry Island (Rosario Strait, Washington), Skagit County, Washington, U.S.
- Strawberry Islands, Door County, Wisconsin, U.S.
- Strawberry Lagoon, California, U.S.
- Strawberry Line railway walk, U.K., a walkway along a former railway line and a model railway line
- Strawberry Mountain (disambiguation), several peaks
- Strawberry Peak, a mountain in California, U.S.
- Strawberry Range, a mountain range in Oregon, U.S.
- Strawberry Reservoir, Utah, U.S.
- Strawberry River (Arkansas), U.S.
- Strawberry River (Utah), U.S.
- Strawberry Tree (disambiguation), several topics
- Strawberry Valley, California, U.S.

== People ==
- Strawberry Saroyan, American journalist and author
- Tamara Greene or Strawberry, exotic dancer

=== Family name ===
- Darryl Strawberry (born 1962), American former baseball player
- D. J. Strawberry, (born 1985), American-Cameroonian basketball player
- Linda Strawberry, American artist, director, editor and musician

== Art, entertainment, and media ==
=== Fictional characters ===
- Ichigo Kurosaki or Strawberry, in the manga series Bleach
- Ichigo Amano, in the manga series Yumeiro Pâtissière
- Strawberry Shortcake, franchised character appearing on greetings cards etc.
- "Strawberry", played by Tom Skeritt in Up In Smoke

=== Films ===
- Strawberry (film), 2015 Tamil film
- Strawberries (film), an upcoming drama film

=== Music ===
==== Bands ====
- Strawberry (band), Canadian indie band formed in 1993

==== Companies ====
- Strawberries, defunct American record store chain acquired by Trans World Entertainment
- Strawberry Studios, recording studio in Stockport, England

==== Albums ====
- Strawberry (album), by Wussy
- Strawberries (album), 1982 album by the Damned
- Strawberry (EP), 2023 EP by Epik High

==== Songs ====
- "Strawberries" (song), 1997 song by Smooth
- "Strawberry" (song), 1998 song by Nicole Renée
- "Strawberry", song by Aidan from This Is Aidan, 2023
- "Strawberry", song by Kara from Step, 2011
- "Strawberries", by Asobi Seksu, 2007
- "Strawberries", by Girl from Sheer Greed, 1980
- "Strawberries", by Jerry Butler from Folk Songs, 1963

=== Publications ===
- The Strawberry Newspaper, a Japanese monthly magazine

== Science and technology ==
- Strawberry, an audio player forked from Clementine (software)
- Strawberry Perl, version of Perl programming language
- Strawberry, a nickname of o1 (generative pre-trained transformer)

== Other uses ==
- Strawberry (bus operator), a bus company in England
- Strawberry (hotel company), a Norwegian hotel company with a major presence in Scandinavia

== See also ==
- Barren Strawberry (disambiguation)
- Strawberry Fields (disambiguation)
- Strawberry generation, Chinese sociological term
- Strawberry mark or hemangioma, a type of birthmark
- Team Strawberry, American cycling team used in scientific research
- Wild Strawberries (disambiguation)
