= Monégasque cuisine =

Culinary traditions of Monaco

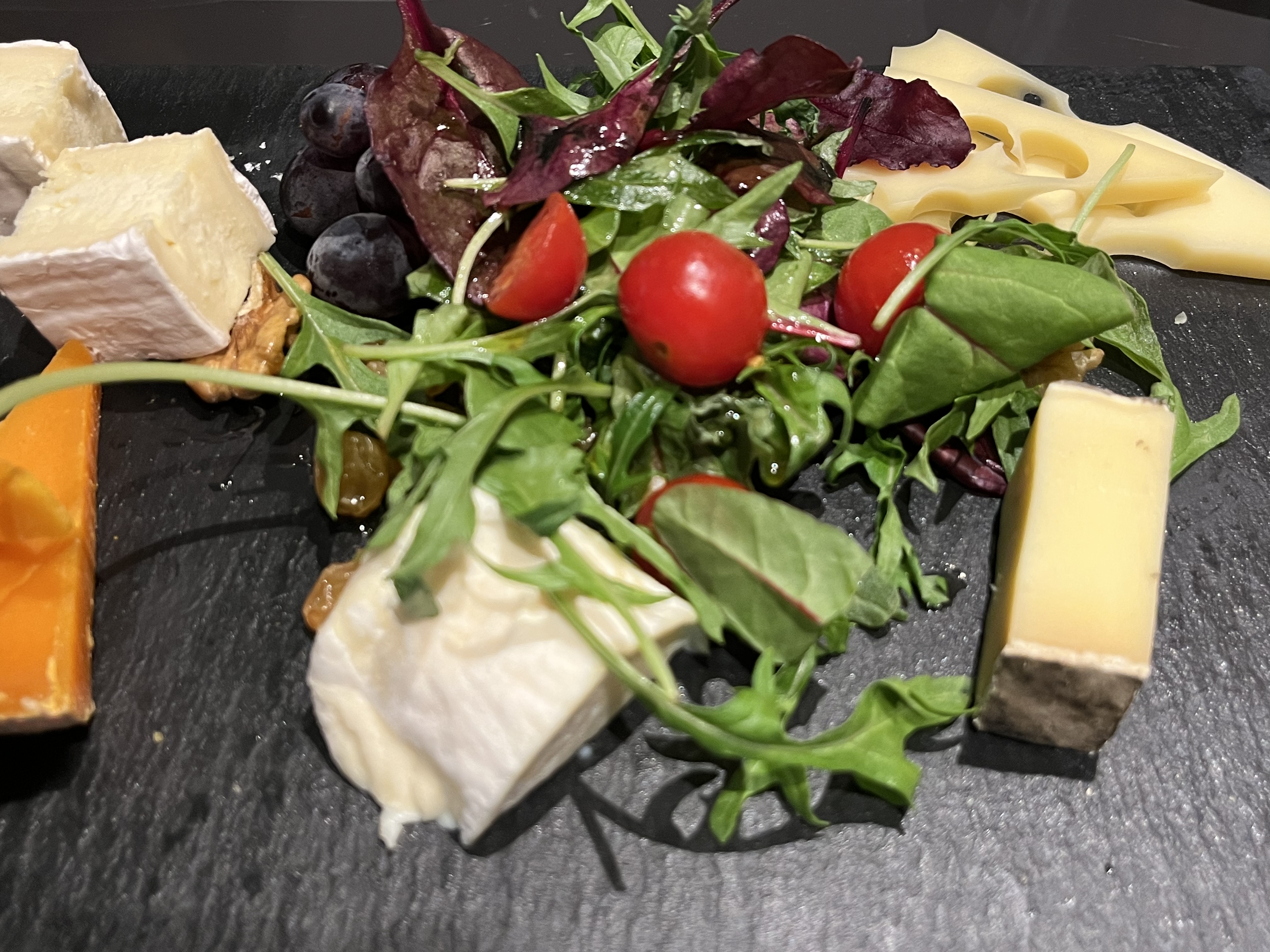
A platter of cheese as served in a hotel in Monaco

Monégasque cuisine is the cuisine of the principality of Monaco. It is a Mediterranean cuisine shaped by the cooking style of Provence and the influences of nearby northern Italian and southern French cooking (and French cuisine in general), in addition to Monaco's own culinary traditions. There is an emphasis on fresh ingredients, with the use of seafood, vegetables and olive oil playing a major role in the cuisine.

A more modern form of Monégasque cuisine has developed since the Monte Carlo Casino opened in the mid-nineteenth century. Some now associate the cuisine with international influences, cosmopolitanism, gastronomy and Michelin-starred restaurants. However, recent years have also seen a revitalised interest in Monaco's authentic local recipes and its more traditional culinary heritage.

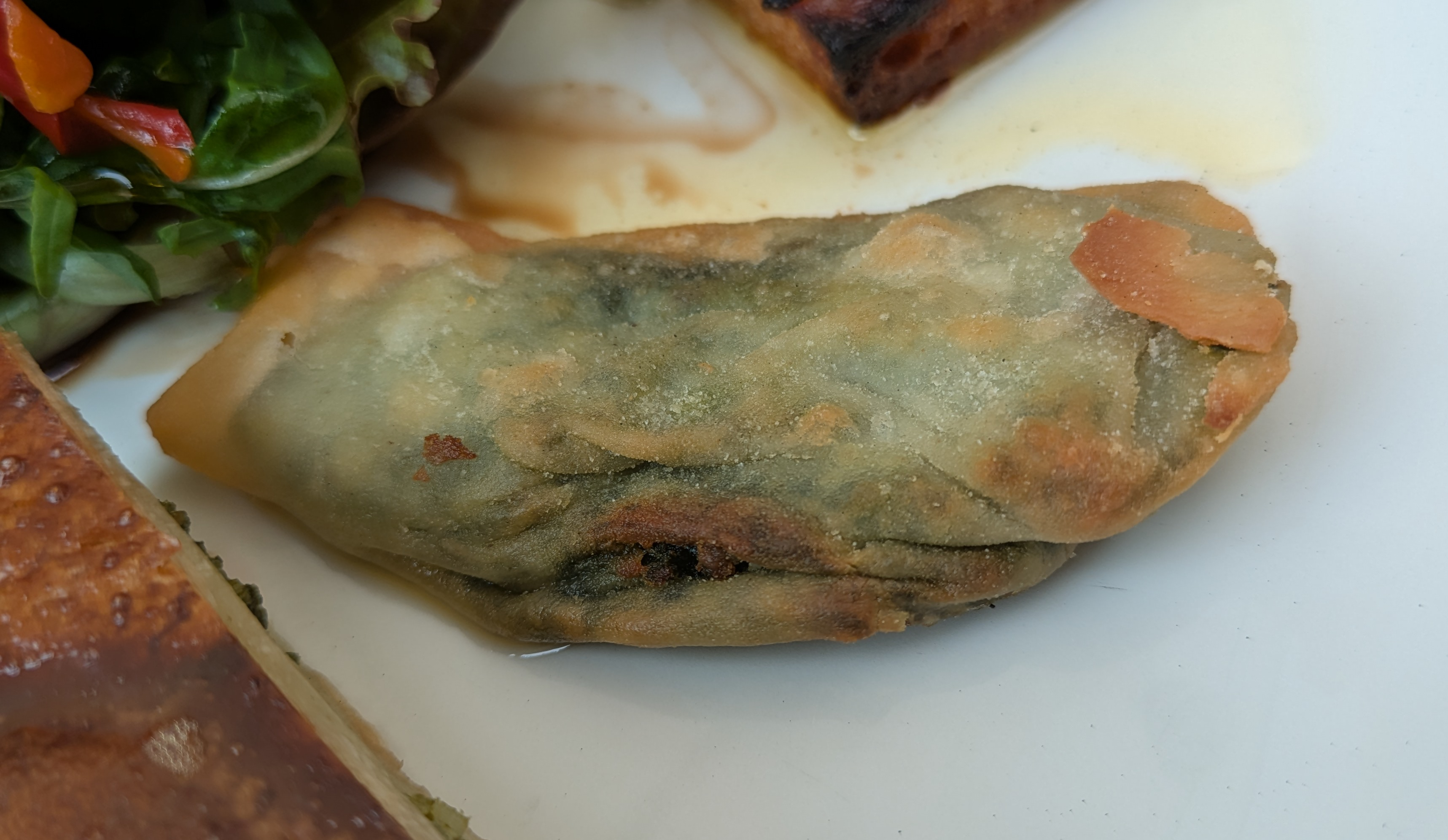
Barbajuan served in Monaco

Despite being the most densely populated country in the world with a population density of 19,331.7 inhabitants/km^{2}, the cuisine of Monaco is relatively obscure than any other parts of Europe due to historical reasons. Barbajuan, a fried ravioli, is supposedly a national dish of Monaco. In Monaco, only two large American fast food chains exist: McDonald's and Starbucks. The largest supermarket is a Carrefour in the "Centre commercial de Fontvieille" mall.

== History ==
=== Early history ===
Monégasque cuisine has developed over many centuries. New ingredients were introduced into the developing cuisine from around 1000 BC, with the extensive Mediterranean Sea trade connecting Monaco with civilisations such as Phoenicia, Greece, Rome and Carthage. Monaco was likely used as a coastal trading post by the ancient Greeks in 600 BC, who introduced grapes and olives into the region, which was already renowned for its lemon orchards. The region came under the rule of the Roman Empire in around 120 BC and Monaco supplied the empire with olive oil, lemons and wine.

=== Modern history ===
In 1918, the Monégasque scholar, historian, writer and linguist Louis Notari (1879–1961) published a history of the principality, in which he expressed his concern for the preservation of Monégasque culture, including its culinary traditions. He wrote about the central role of olive, lemon and orange trees to traditional Monégasque cuisine. He attributed the disappearance of Monaco's fields of lemon and orange trees to the urban transformation of its landscape.

Notari made reference to fougasse, a flatbread dish, as an authentic national food which he believed needed to be preserved. He included his recipe for a traditional version of the pastry, which he believed was best served with orange blossom, light brandy, locally-grown Monégasque almonds and Fenouillet-Gris, a small apple, red and white in colour, which originated from Fenouillet in the Haute-Garonne department West of Monaco. These ingredients that Notari listed for the local fougasse were derived almost exclusively from Monaco's local vegetation and agricultural products.

=== Impact of tourism on cuisine ===
In the 18th century, the French Riviera’s culinary offerings were described as "paltry" by Tobias Smollett, who published the popular travel book Travels Through France and Italy (1792) which characterised Monaco as a backward and remote fishing town.

Monaco's first casino, Villa Bellevue, was founded in 1854, but the principality lacked sufficient amenities for travellers, with only one inn serving food and drink.

In 1863, the entrepreneur François Blanc expressed his aim to reinvent the Villa Bellevue, and the Golden Square, Monte Carlo's resort-centre containing restaurants and cafés, was inaugurated, offering gourmet culinary options for patrons. The following list of dishes was taken from the Hôtel de Paris in 1898 and is an example of a typical menu at a restaurant in Monte Carlo during the late 1890s:

- Saumon Fumé de Hollande
- Ox-tail Clair en Tasse
- Velouté de Homard au Paprika
- Truite Saumonée à la Chambord
- Tourte de Ris-de-Veau Brillat-Savarin
- Selle d’Agneau de Lait Polignac
- Pommes Dauphin
- Petits Pois Fine-Fleur
- Caille de Vigne à la Richelieu
- Sorbet au Clicquot
- Poularde Soufflée Impériale
- Pâté de Foie Gras d’Alsace
- Salade Aïda
- Asperges d’Argenteuil Sauce Mousseline
- Buisson d’Ecrevisses à la Nage
- Crêpes Flambées au Grand Marnier
- Ananas Givré à l’Orientale
- Coffret de Friandises

By 1903, restaurants in Monte Carlo were hiring celebrated chefs from across Europe to elevate their culinary offerings, which became renowned for their exorbitance and international origins. Dining options included the restaurants of the Hotel du Monte Carlo, Ciro's, Café Riche, the Grand, the Hermitage, the Sporting Club, the Palais du Soleil, the Helder, Aubanel's Restaurant, Restaurant Ré, the Riviera Palace and the Hôtel de Paris. Whilst Monégasque cuisine experienced tremendous growth due to a focus on gastronomy in this period, some feared that the more traditional aspects of the cuisine would be eradicated.

In 2010, 57.4 percent of stars awarded by the Michelin Guide were accounted for by the French regions of Île- de-France, Rhône-Alpes, Aquitaine, Bretagne and finally Provence-Alpes-Côte-d’Azur, in which Monaco is situated.

== Preserving culinary traditions ==
In recent years, with the globalisation of food cultures, there has been growing interest in the preservation of Monégasque cuisine and the return to the more traditional culinary traditions influenced by Provence. This interest in preserving culinary traditions often involves areas with strong connections to Mediterranean cultural heritage. An area of interest is the preservation of local agricultural knowledge in the farming and production of key ingredients in Monégasque cuisine, such as fish, wine, cheese, fruit and vegetables, meat and oils. Others include the culinary significance of olives and olive-growing traditions, and the practice of purchasing fresh ingredients from local marketplaces.

== Common ingredients ==
=== Fruit and vegetables ===
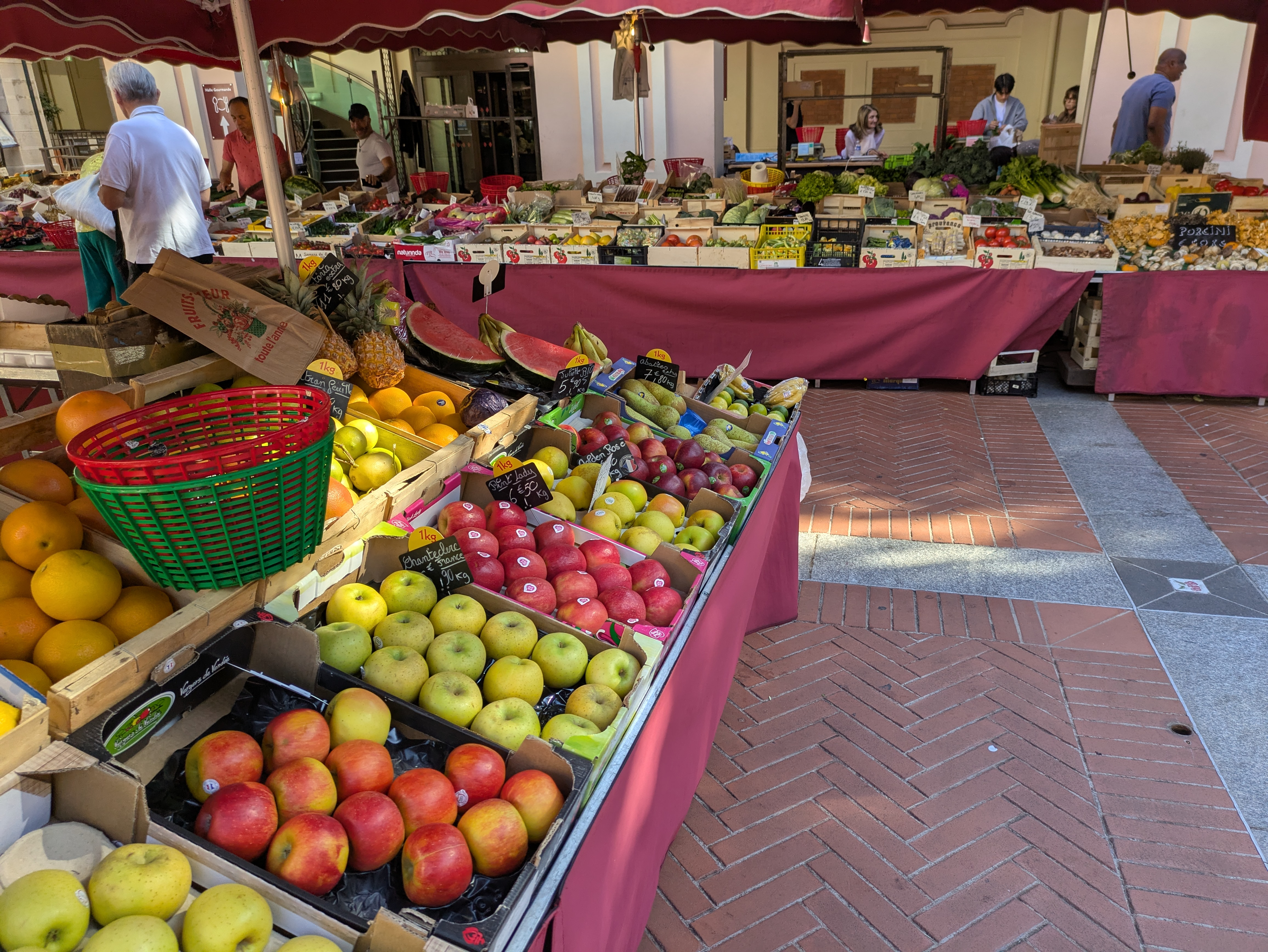
Produce for sale at a street market in Monaco

Fresh fruit is commonly consumed alone or used in desserts, and the region abounds in varieties of fruit. Common fruits include oranges and lemons from Menton, Cavaillon melons, cherries from Luberon, apricots, table grapes, figs, raspberries, bananas, strawberries and apples.

Many Monégasque dishes feature fresh and seasonal local vegetables, including asparagus in the spring, zucchinis and eggplant in the summer, pumpkin in the fall, onions, green pepper, artichokes, tomatoes, fennel, green beans, celery and potatoes. Vegetables can be cut up and served raw as crudités with a dip, such as anchovy paste mixed with garlic and olive oil.

=== Meat and seafood ===
The nearby coastline means that seafood is generally more popular than meat, with varieties of freshly caught fish including sea bass, tuna, salmon, red snapper, mullet, anchovy, monkfish and cod. Other types of seafood include octopus, conger eel, prawns, mussel, squid, sea urchins and shellfish.

The most commonly used meat in Monégasque cuisine is lamb, which is often roasted with herbs. Beef is rarely consumed as steaks or roasts, used more popularly in slow-cooked stews called daubes. Wild game, including rabbits, boars and birds, were popular in the past, but the decline of hunting has reduced the usage of game in Monégasque cuisine.

=== Other staples ===
Other common ingredients in Monégasque cuisine include nuts such as almonds, chestnuts and walnuts, herbs such as saffron and basil, garlic, anise, honey, butter and jam, eggs and orange blossom. The region is not as famous for cheese as the surrounding regions of France and Italy. Nonetheless, a popular choice of cheese is Banon goat cheese, which is nutty, formed into small disks, individually wrapped in chestnut leaves, and tied up with raffia.

Further staples include pasta and rice, whist olives are a local product which form an integral part of Monégasque cuisine and the Mediterranean diet.

== Common dishes ==
Name	Image	Description
Anchoiade		A salty anchovy paste made with olive oil
Barbagiuan		A fritter with a rich filling, eaten as an entree The filling is varied, and can include zucchini and eggs or rice and pumpkin.
Beignets de fleurs de courgette		Deep-fried courgette flower fritters served with tomato sauce
Bouillabaisse		A seafood stew with various ingredients. It is arguably the most popular dish in the Riviera region. It normally consists of at least four kinds of fish cooked in a fish broth or stock. The most common types of fish used in this stew include shellfish, halibut, mullet, monkfish, snapper, conger eel and scorpion fish.
Brandaminciun		A traditional dish of salted cod, which can be prepared with garlic, oil and cream. It is often served during the meal on Christmas Day.
Florentine		A thin biscuit, usually containing almonds and orange peel, coated on one side in chocolate.
Fougasse		A biscuit or small sweet bread, sometimes regarded as a national dish. It is often flavoured with oranges, nuts, raisins, anise, apples and brandy.
Fraises de bois au vin rouge		A dessert consisting of wild strawberries served in red wine
Pan-bagnat		An entrée of salade niçoise served on bread and dipped in olive oil, vinegar, garlic and basil
Pasqualina		A layered chard pie which is often the centrepiece dish on Easter day
Pissaladière		A Provençal dish consisting of a bready tart, filled with onion, olive, anchovy and herbs
Rougets à la Niçoise		A Niçois entrée of sautéed red mullet with olives, anchovies, capers and tomatoes
Salade Niçoise		A light salad with olives, tuna, anchovies and olive oil
Socca		A crêpe made using chickpea flour and olive oil
Soup aux moules		A soup which is often served as an appetizer. It includes mussels with herbs and vermicelli
Soupe de pistou		A vegetable soup made with a pesto of basil and olive oil
Stocafi		A casserole with stockfish, white wine, cognac and tomatoes
Tarte au citron		A buttery lemon tart, often served as a dessert
Tourte de blette	Swiss chard pie	A pastry that is filled with cheese and Swiss chard. Other ingredients in the filling may include parsley, eggs, onions and rice.
U Pan de Natale		A sweet bread traditionally served during Christmastide. It is a circular loaf which is decorated with four walnuts in the shape of a cross, and sprigs from an olive and orange tree are placed in the centre of the bread.

== Culinary traditions and customs ==
=== Dining at home ===
A baguette is a popular choice for breakfast. Monégasque people may choose to make a trip to the local bakery to ensure that the bread is served fresh for the first meal of the day. Instead of placing the bread into a bag, it is often carried with a piece of paper wrapped around the middle, a practice which aims to maintain its freshness. The meal may also involve other pastries such as croissants and pain au chocolat. Beverages often accompany the meal, with popular choices including freshly squeezed orange juice or coffee.

Traditionally, lunch is the main meal of the day. On every Friday of the year, the traditional Monegasque lunch, or dernā, consists of stocafi.

Monégasque families are able to obtain fresh produce for home-cooked meals at the open-air markets around the principality.

=== Dining out ===
In a Monégasque restaurant, a typical menu will consist of several courses. The first course is a starter, or hors d'œvres, which generally involves a soup or a paté. This may be followed by an entrée which is most often a fish or an omelette dish. The main course is then served, and it mainly consists of either lamb, beef, poultry or game, served with a garni, which is vegetables with rice or potatoes. After the main course, some restaurants' menus will include a green salad, followed by cheese and dessert. Coffee may also be served, often by itself, rather than with the dessert.

=== Special occasions ===
It is a tradition for Monégasque people to gather with others for meals during holidays and other festive celebrations. Culinary traditions in Monaco are also often linked with religious observations.

The blessing of the throat is a custom that is observed on St Blaise's Day (3 February, the day after Candlemas). It involves attending church with a small package of dried figs, which are to be blessed before making an infusion consisting of cloves, slices of apple and cinnamon. The drinking of this beverage is believed to miraculously cure throat ailments.

On Ash Wednesday, the traditional midday lunch meal consists of a chickpea soup, which includes garlic and herbs such as sage and bay leaves for flavouring. Lent is also observed by the Monégasques with the preparation of a traditional dish, barbagiuans, which are now consumed all year round.

Monégasque families traditionally gather for a meal together after attending church on Easter day. The traditional dishes which are consumed on this day include roast kid and a type of chard pie known as pasqualina. Around Easter time every year, street vendors sell Easter pastries known as cannestreli, which are decorated with red coloured hard boiled eggs wrapped with a lattice of pastry to imitate the appearance of woven baskets.

Christmas is generally celebrated with a meal amongst family members. Traditionally, preceding the Christmas meal, families would observe the ‘rite of the olive branch’ where the youngest family member dips an olive branch into a glass of wine, before everyone takes a sip of wine. During the following meal, a range of dishes would be consumed, including brandaminciun (salted cod dish), cardu (cardoon or artichoke thistle) served in a béchamel sauce, apple fritters and fougasse.

At the centre of the table, the family would place u pan de Natale, the Christmas loaf, which is ceremonially left there until Epiphany. Thirteen traditional desserts are also left alongside the bread on the table. These dessert dishes are kept filled until Epiphany. They may include green and black grapes, three types of ground nuts, three types of dried fruits, two citrus fruits, two deep-fried desserts, and seasonal pears and apples.

The baking of mariote e gali for children is another culinary custom during Christmastime. They are made with the leftover dough from the fougasse and are shaped into dolls that resemble gingerbread men. The eyes and mouth may be formed from sugared almonds, with aniseed scattered around the body of the doll.
