= Mount Lawlor =

Mountain in California, United States

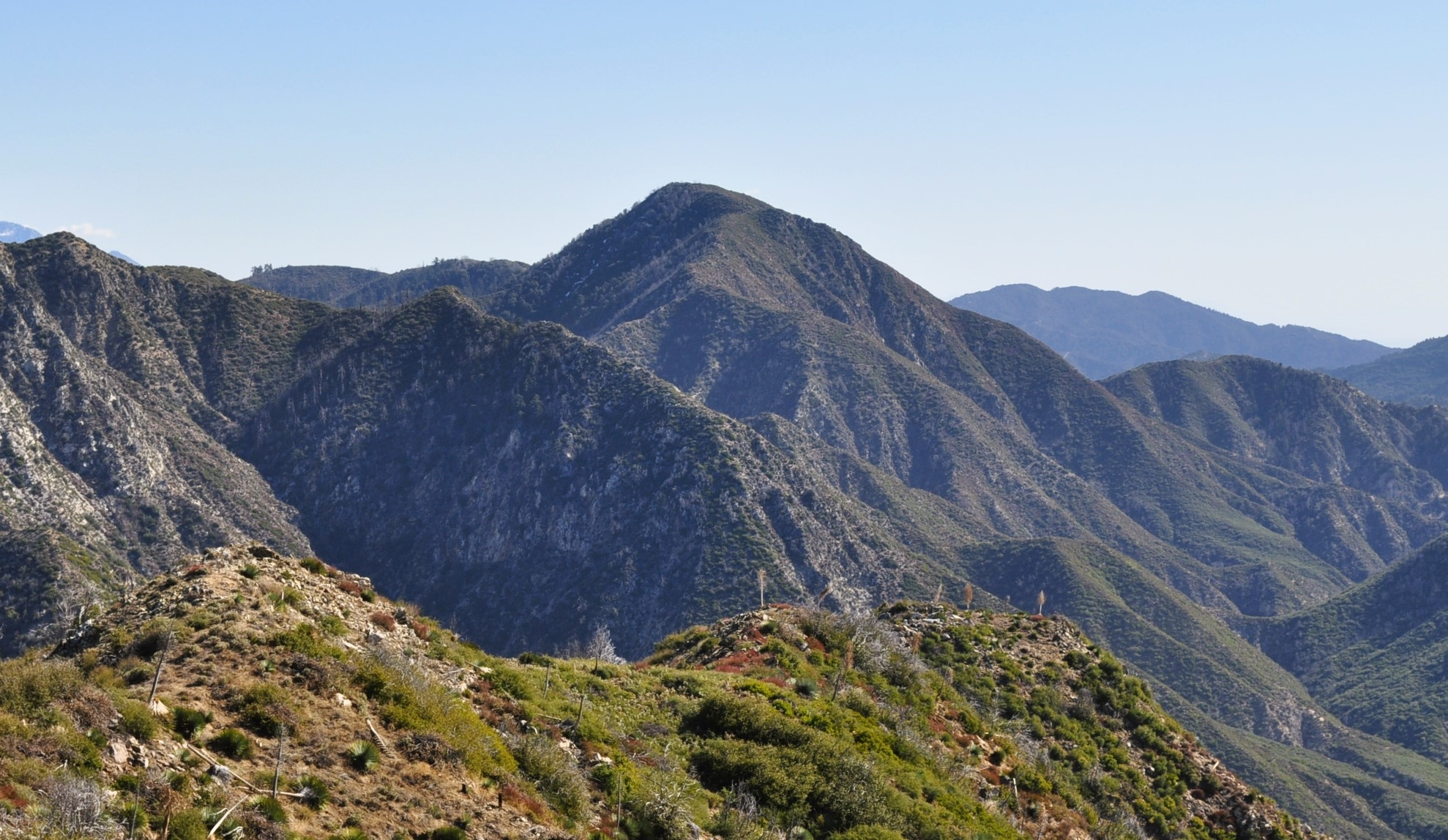
- West aspect, viewed from Josephine Peak

Highest point
- Elevation: 5,961 ft (1,817 m)
- Prominence: 745 ft (227 m)
- Parent peak: Strawberry Peak (6,164 ft)
- Isolation: 1.30 mi (2.09 km)
- Listing: Hundred Peaks Section
- Coordinates: 34°16′14″N 118°06′14″W

Naming
- Etymology: Oscar Lawler

Geography
- Location within California Location within the United States
- Country: United States
- State: California
- County: Los Angeles
- Protected area: San Gabriel Mountains National Monument
- Parent range: San Gabriel Mountains
- Topo map: USGS Chilao Flat

Geology
- Mountain type: Fault block

Climbing
- First ascent: 1887

Mount Lawlor is a 5,961-foot-elevation (1,817-meter) mountain summit located in the San Gabriel Mountains, in Los Angeles County, California, United States.

== Description ==
Mount Lawlor is set within San Gabriel Mountains National Monument, approximately six miles (9.7 km) north of the community of Altadena and 18 miles (29 km) north-northeast of downtown Los Angeles. Precipitation runoff from this mountain's north slope drains to Big Tujunga Creek, the southwest slope drains to Arroyo Seco, and the southeast slope drains into headwaters of the West Fork San Gabriel River. Topographic relief is significant as the summit rises 1,800 feet (549 meters) above the West Fork in approximately one mile (1.6 km). Reaching the summit involves hiking six miles (round-trip) with 1,300 feet of elevation gain. In 2009, the mountain's chaparral-covered slopes were burned by the Station Fire. The mountain is named (but misspelled) after Oscar Lawler (1875–1966), a Los Angeles attorney with a fondness for the San Gabriel Mountains and an interest in conservation. This landform's toponym has been officially adopted by the U.S. Board on Geographic Names. The first known ascent of this mountain was made in 1887 by brothers Jason and Owen Brown.

== Climate ==
According to the Köppen climate classification system, Mount Lawlor is located in a continental climate zone (Dsa) with mostly dry summers (except for scattered summer thunderstorms) and cold, wet winters. Most weather fronts originating in the Pacific Ocean travel east toward the San Gabriel Mountains. As fronts approach, they are forced upward by the peaks (orographic lift), causing them to drop their moisture onto the range.

== Gallery ==
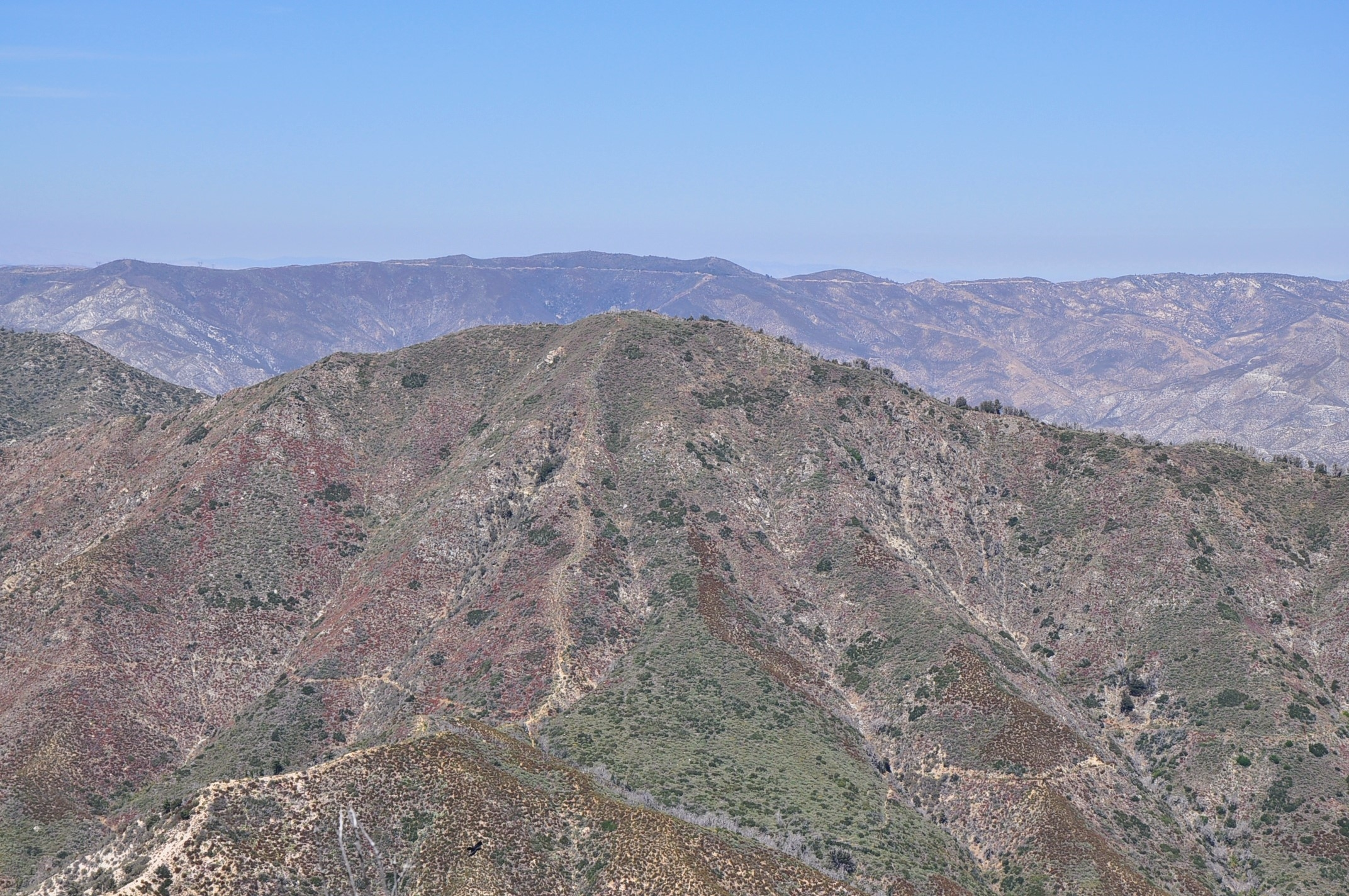
South aspect of Mount Lawlor viewed from San Gabriel Peak

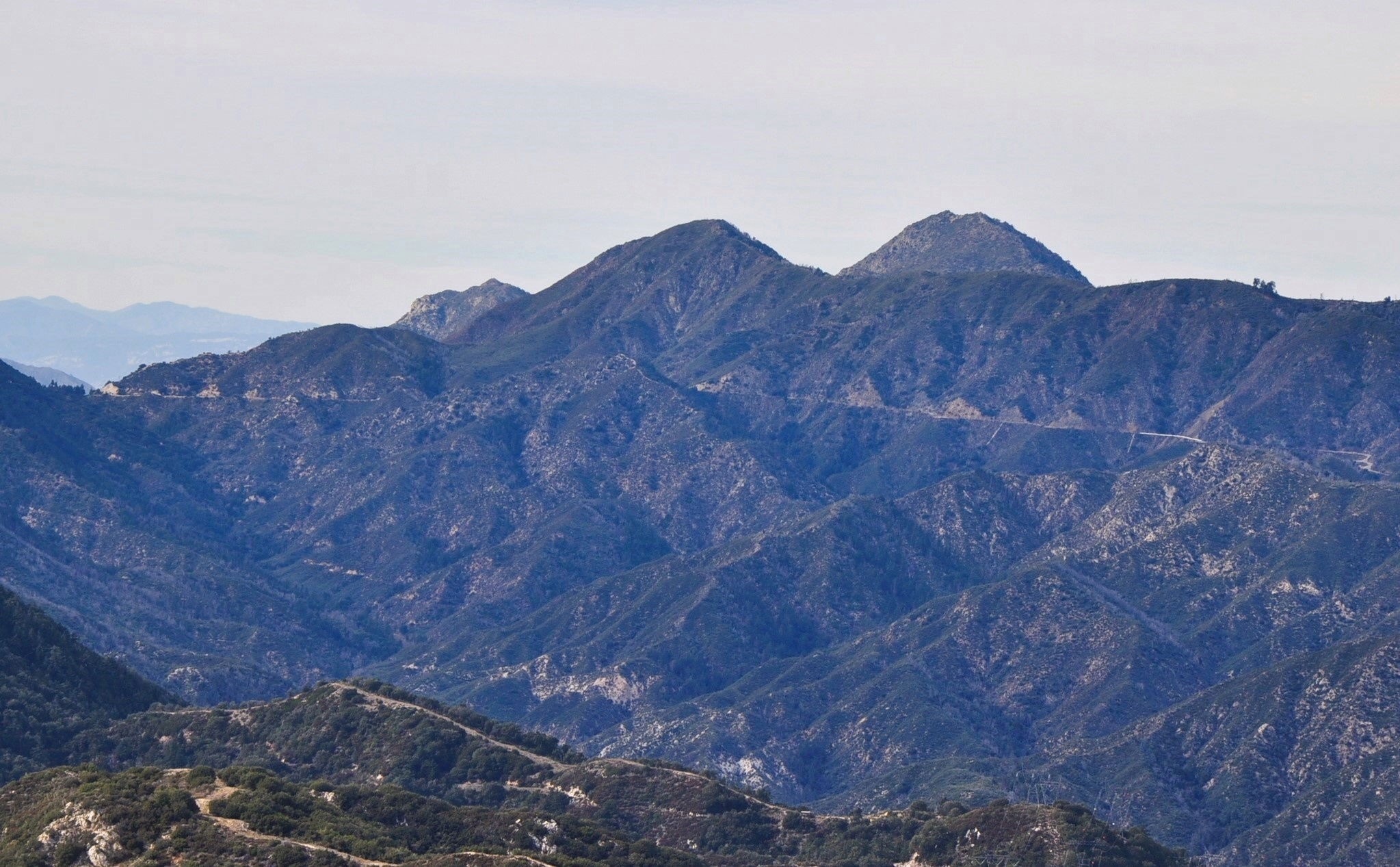
Southeast aspect of Mount Lawlor (center) with Strawberry Peak (behind, right) viewed from Monrovia Peak
