= Monrovian =

Monrovian(s) may refer to:

- The demonym for Monrovia, Liberia
- Wichita Monrovians, an American baseball team (fl.1920s)

== See also ==
- Monrovia (disambiguation)
