= Ku Klux Klan in sports =

The 1920s heralded the start of new leisurely activities for many Americans, including sports such as Baseball and Boxing. At the same time, organizations trying to make inroads with popular American culture at the time began to use such sports to their advantage both amongst themselves and against other organizations.

== Background ==
During the revival of the Ku Klux Klan in the late 1910s and 1920s, the Klan attempted to make inroads with several aspects of mass culture of the United States. This came in several ways, such as the movie, sometimes considered by scholars to be the first "blockbuster," Birth of a Nation. However, the Klan also made attempts at influencing other parts of emerging mass culture, such as radio, theater, and sports.

=== Scholarly Disputes on the Klan in Sports ===
According to scholar Kathleen M. Blee, Klan involvement in sports was a way of drawing attention to themselves, and it was an attempt by the Klan to project an image of themselves as "pro-Protestant" rather than "anti-" other groups. She also asserts that the use of baseball in Klan events was to have a social aspect in those gatherings, and thus be able to attract more people to the "Klannish" way of life and societies.

However, according to author Felix Harcourt, Klan involvement in sports such as baseball was simply an extension of their members' membership within broader American culture. He also argues that the ease with which the Klan could enter sports (either as individual players or as 'Klan leagues') was a symptom of how easily the Ku Klux Klan was able to generally penetrate American mass culture of the 1920s as a whole. He argues that since Klan baseball games tended to not draw mass attention of news headlines (with the exception of the Wichita Monrovians game) or other forms of emerging popular media such as radio, and especially because Klan teams occasionally played against teams with members of ethnicities the Klan was against, these games were not meant to reinforce any image of the Klan and were only intended to be recreational opportunities for Klan members themselves.

== Klan Sports Games ==
=== Game Against the Wichita Monrovians ===
The most popularized game of the Klan in baseball is widely regarded to be the Klan. No 6 game against the Wichita Monrovians, a "semipro" team consisting of all-African American players. It was umpired by two local Irish Catholic amateur Umpires, and resulted in a win for the Wichita Monrovians, 10 - 8.

=== Game Against the Knights of Columbus ===
In Georgia, the Knights of Columbus team had played in the Spalding League, considered to be the most prestigious league in the city, while the Klan team had played in the "Dixie", or "City [of Atlanta]" League. While the Ku Klux Klan and the Knights of Columbus had enmity towards each other, their nonleague game against each other in 1923 was considered to be peaceful. The Ku Klux Klan won this game, but according to Harcourt, this was secondary news to the Klan winning the Dixie League that same year.

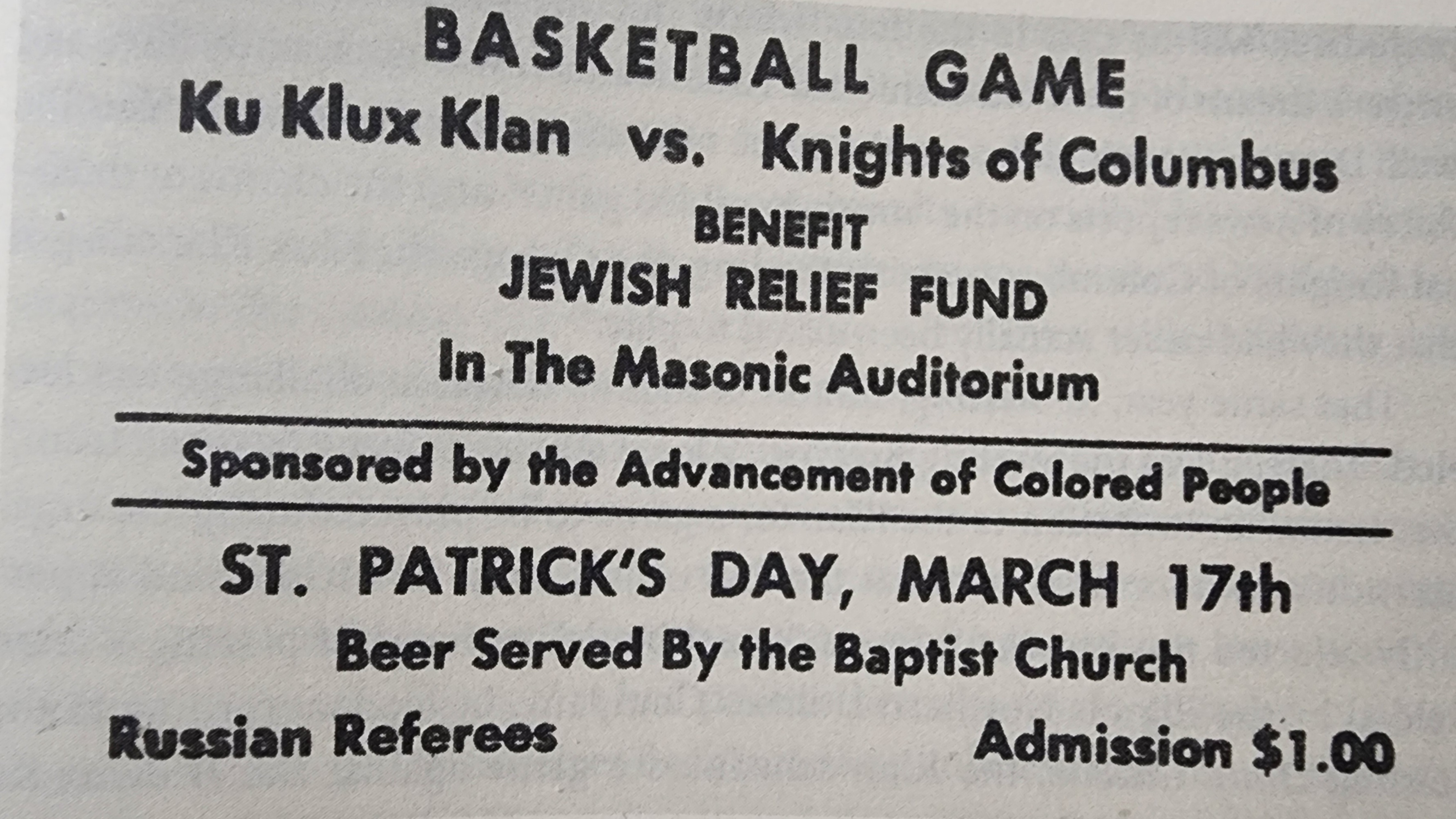
A popular novelty ticket for an imaginary Basketball game between the Ku Klux Klan and Knights of Columbus, benefitting the Jewish Relief Fund.

==== "Joke" Tickets between a KKK - Knights of Columbus Game ====
In 1924, Klan pastor Colonel Evan Watkins challenged the Knights of Columbus to a baseball game. There was reportedly even an umpire picked out, however the game never took place. Similarly, in 1925 local newspapers of Orange, Texas reported that a local Klan chapter would play against the Knights of Columbus as a charity game benefitting the town school. However, no evidence of these games exist. More prominently, talk of such a Basketball game became a common joke among newspaper headlines at the time, leading the 1923 Imperial Night-Hawk to call it an "Old Chestnut." However, novelty tickets to the fictitious game were sold.

===== JNL Employee Lawsuit =====
In August 2011, a Jackson National Life (JNL) employee named Angela Shaft, who is African-American, found a copy of the novelty ticket in her attic. She attached a picture of this ticket in an email to an African-American coworker, intending to share it as an interesting historical artifact. However, the coworker found this ticket to be offensive, and Shaft was fired from her job at JNL, with JNL citing harassment for their reason of termination. Shaft then filed a lawsuit against JNL, claiming the ticket and email was not harassment under the law. The lawsuit was eventually sent to an appellate court which concluded that the termination was legally appropriate, and sent it down to a lower court which entered an order of dismissal for the case, resulting in a victory for JNL.

=== Game Against the Independent Order of B'nai B'rith ===
The Los Angeles Klan No. 1 played a 3-game charity series against the local chapter of the Independent Order of B'Nai B'rith, which is a Jewish service organization that has existed since 1843 when it was founded by German-Jewish immigrants in New York. The game was played in Vernon Ball Park. The charity benefitted Los Angeles' Crippled Children's Christmas Fund.

=== D.C. Klan Games Against Catholic Organizations ===
The D.C. Ku Klux Klan played the "Wee-Willie" Glascoe's Shamrocks" in 1925 (an all-Irish team) and lost. The Klan also played against the St Joseph's Catholic Church team. The Klan then played the Shamrocks again in 1926 and beat them 13 - 12. The Klan also played against the St. Mary's Celtics team and lost 2 - 0.

=== Game Against the Hebrew All-Stars ===
In September 1927, the D.C. Ku Klux Klan No. 2 played the all-Jewish team "Hebrew All-Stars." This game was organized by Jewish doctor Carl "Ikey" Dreyfus. The Ku Klux Klan won the game four runs to none, and, although anomalous, this game was not widely noted by newspapers, with the Washington Evening Star only briefly mentioning this game.

=== Junior Klan Sports ===
Junior Klan involvement in baseball leagues was very common, including the Xenia Junior Clan of Ohio. The Xenia Junior Klan won the 1926 state championship, and in 1927 lost the title to the Lima Junior Klan.

== Klan Boycotts of Mixed-Race Games ==
=== Dodgers - Crackers Boycott ===
In 1949, Samuel Green, who was a Grand Wizard of the Ku Klux Klan in the 1940s, planned to boycott a series between the Brooklyn Dodgers and the Atlanta Crackers set to happen in Atlanta's Ponce De Leon Park. This game was set to be the first time in Atlanta that black and white players would compete against each other, notably including Jackie Robinson, who was playing for the Dodgers. Green claimed that 10,000 people had signed a petition to never go to the stadium ever again after the game, but the existence of this petition is not confirmed. Scholar Kenneth R. Fester claims that Green likely invented the petition to scare the game from occurring, but despite his efforts the game proceeded.

=== Joe Louis v Primo Carnera Fight ===
In June 1935, African-American boxer Joe Louis was set to play the Italian heavyweight champion boxer (1933–34) in Harlem. To prepare for this fight, Louis trained at Dr. Joseph Bier's estate with the help of his trainer from Kentucky nicknamed "Blackburn". Dr. Bier was threatened by the Ku Klux Klan, but both the training and game proceeded without issue, resulting in a win for Louis.

== Klan Sportsmen in Prominent Positions ==
=== C.C. McCall ===
Charlie C. (or C.C.) McCall, was the Attorney General of Alabama from 1927-1931. He was apparently once known as "Spider Kelley" of the A.E.F boxing ring. However, C.C. McCall resigned from the Klan following prosecution against several Klan members and a wish to not be involved with an "organization which banishes its members for telling the truth in courts of justice."
