= Strawberry Valley =

Strawberry Valley may refer to:

- A valley where strawberry grow
- Strawberry Valley Station
- Strawberry Valley, Mount Shasta, California
- Strawberry Valley, California
- Strawberry Valley Project
- Strawberry Valley, Nye County, Nevada
- Strawberry Valley Band of Pakan'yani Maidu (a.k.a. Strawberry Valley Rancheria)
- Strawberry Reservoir in Strawberry Valley
- Strawberry Valley National Wildlife Refuge
- Strawberry, Tuolumne County, California in Strawberry Valley
- Strawberry Valley, Oregon
- Idyllwild–Pine Cove, California was called Strawberry Valley
- Strawberry Valley House, El Dorado County, California
- Strawberry Valley, Arizona
- Strawberry Valley, Irvine, California
- Strawberry Valley, Tuolumne County, California

== Also see ==
- Strawberry (disambiguation)
