= Monrovia (disambiguation) =

Monrovia is the capital city of the West African country of Liberia.

Monrovia may also refer to:

== Places ==
=== Liberia ===
- Greater Monrovia District, one of four districts located in Montserrado County, Liberia

=== United States ===
- Monrovia, Alabama
- Monrovia, California
- Monrovia, Indiana
- Monrovia, Kansas
- Monrovia, Maryland
- Monrovia station, a light rail station in Los Angeles

== Other uses ==
- SS Monrovia, a Liberian cargo ship in service 1954-59
- Monrovia Unified School District, a school district in Los Angeles County, California
- Monrovia High School, in Monrovia, California
- Monrovia Handicap, an American Thoroughbred horse race
- Monrovia Peak, a mountain in California
- Mon Rovîa (born Janjay Rowe), an Afro-Appalachian folk singer-songwriter

== See also ==
- Monrovian
