= Josephine Peak =

Mountain in California, United States

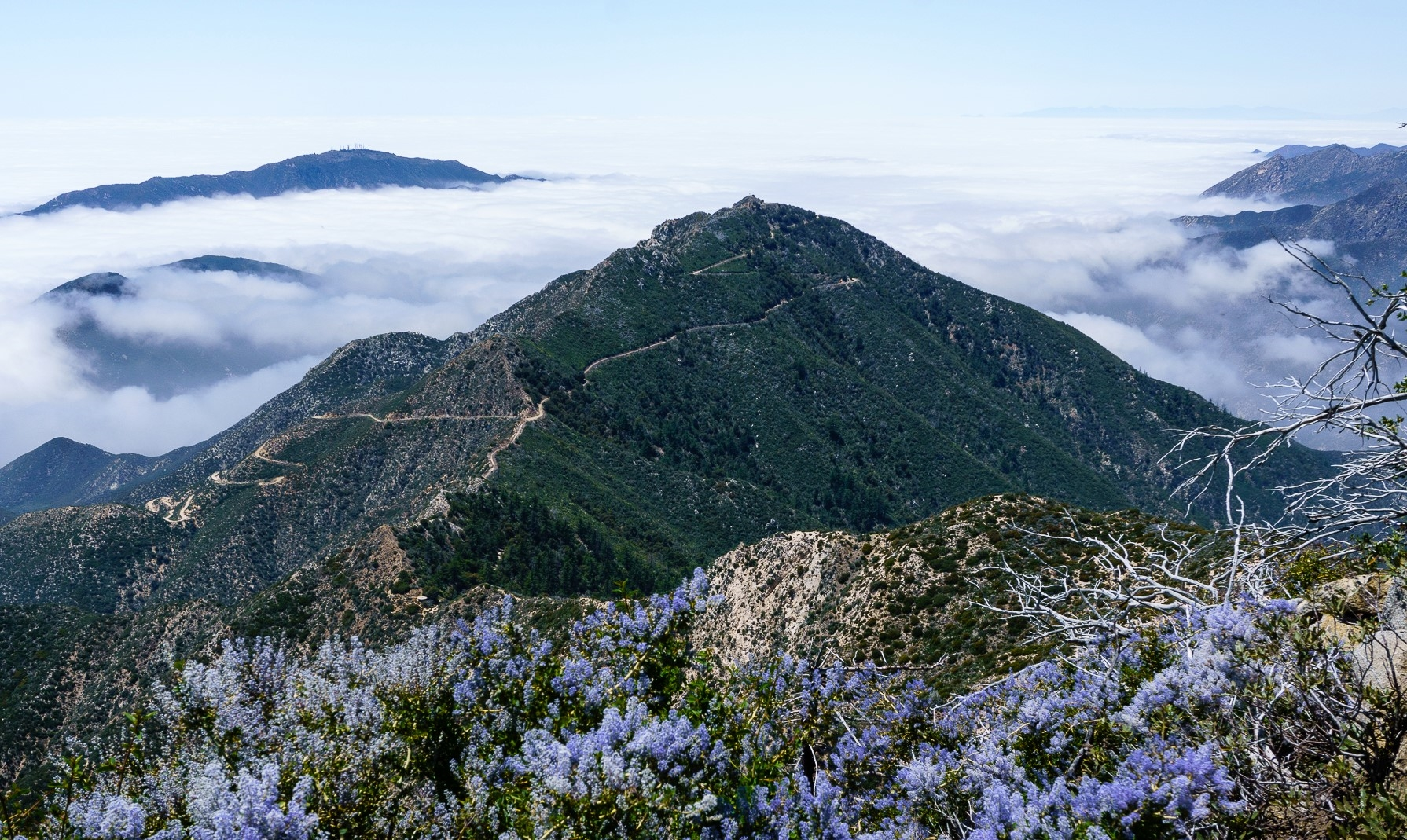
- East aspect, viewed from Strawberry Peak

Highest point
- Elevation: 5,561 ft (1,695 m)
- Prominence: 698 ft (213 m)
- Parent peak: Strawberry Peak (6,164 ft)
- Isolation: 1.91 mi (3.07 km)
- Listing: Hundred Peaks Section
- Coordinates: 34°17′08″N 118°09′14″W

Naming
- Etymology: Josephine Lippencott

Geography
- Location within California Location within the United States
- Country: United States
- State: California
- County: Los Angeles
- Protected area: San Gabriel Mountains National Monument
- Parent range: San Gabriel Mountains
- Topo map: USGS Condor Peak

Geology
- Mountain type: Fault block

Climbing
- Easiest route: Josephine Peak Trail

Josephine Peak is a 5,561-foot-elevation (1,695-meter) mountain summit located in the San Gabriel Mountains, in Los Angeles County, California, United States.

== Description ==
Josephine Peak is set within San Gabriel Mountains National Monument, approximately six miles (9.7 km) north of the community of Altadena and 18 miles (29 km) north-northeast of downtown Los Angeles. Topographic relief is significant as the summit rises 2,450 feet (747 meters) above Clear Creek in approximately one mile. Hiking to the summit involves eight miles of trail with 2,100 feet of elevation gain. A fire lookout tower stood on the summit from 1937 through 1976. The mountain is named after Josephine Lippencott (1866–1951), wife of USGS surveyor Joseph Barlow Lippencott who used this summit as a triangulation station in 1894. This landform's toponym has been officially adopted by the U.S. Board on Geographic Names.

== Climate ==
According to the Köppen climate classification system, Josephine Peak is located in a continental climate zone (Dsa) with mostly dry summers (except for scattered summer thunderstorms) and cold, wet winters. Most weather fronts originating in the Pacific Ocean travel east toward the San Gabriel Mountains. As fronts approach, they are forced upward by the peaks (orographic lift), causing them to drop their moisture onto the range. Precipitation runoff from this mountain drains to Big Tujunga Creek.

== See also ==
- Lippincott Mountain

== Gallery ==
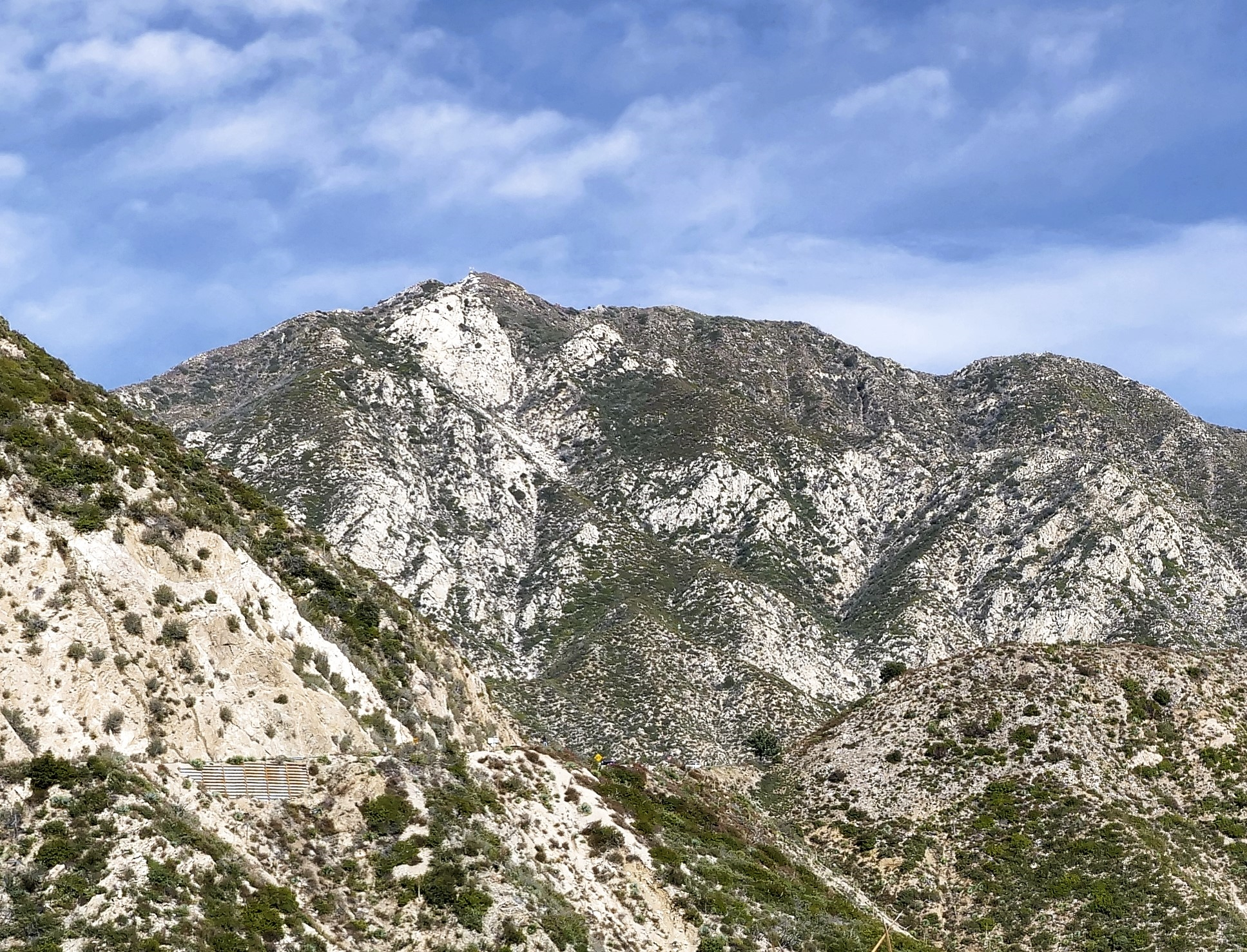
Southwest aspect

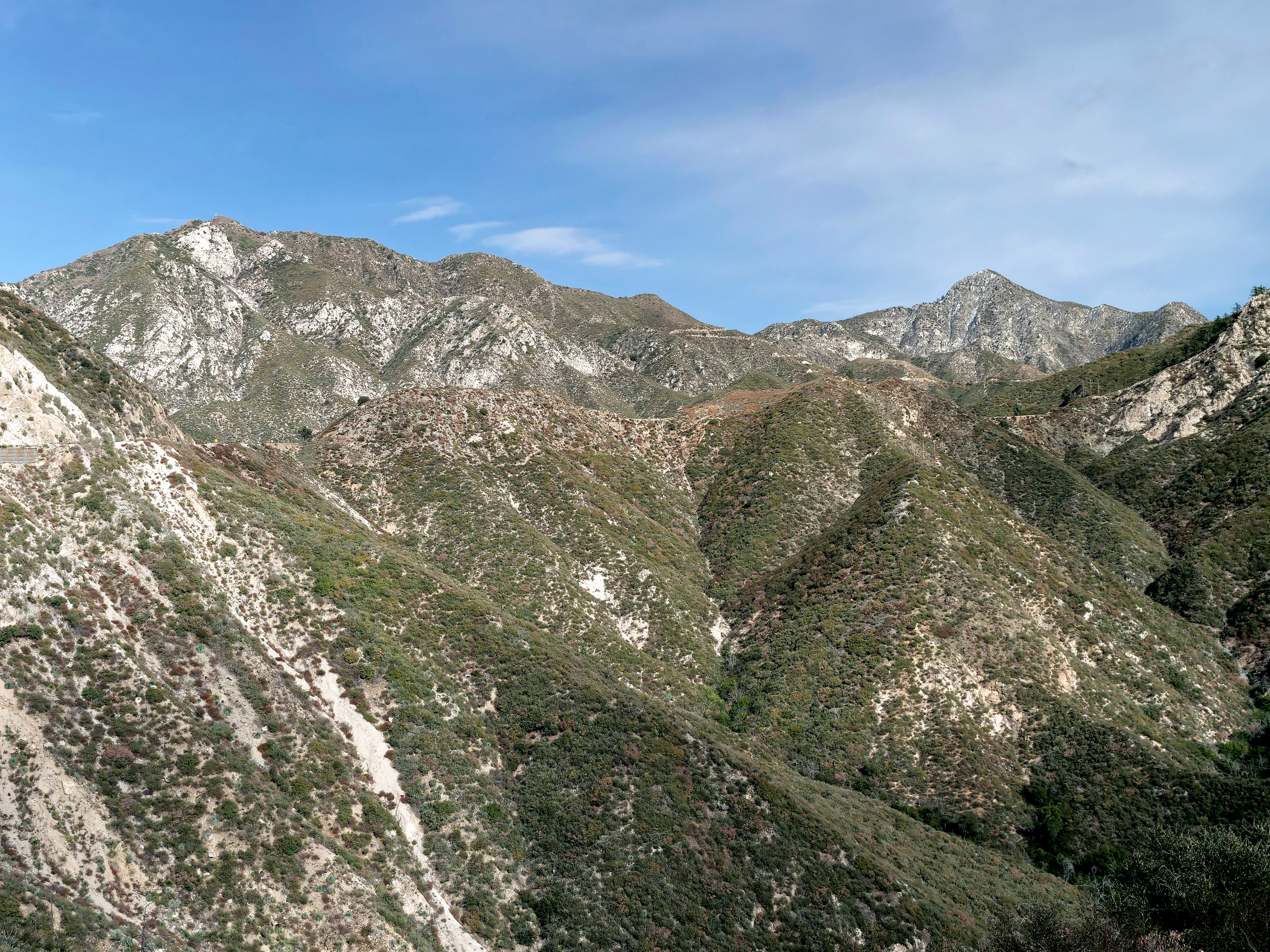
Southwest aspect of Josephine Peak (upper left) and Strawberry Peak to right.

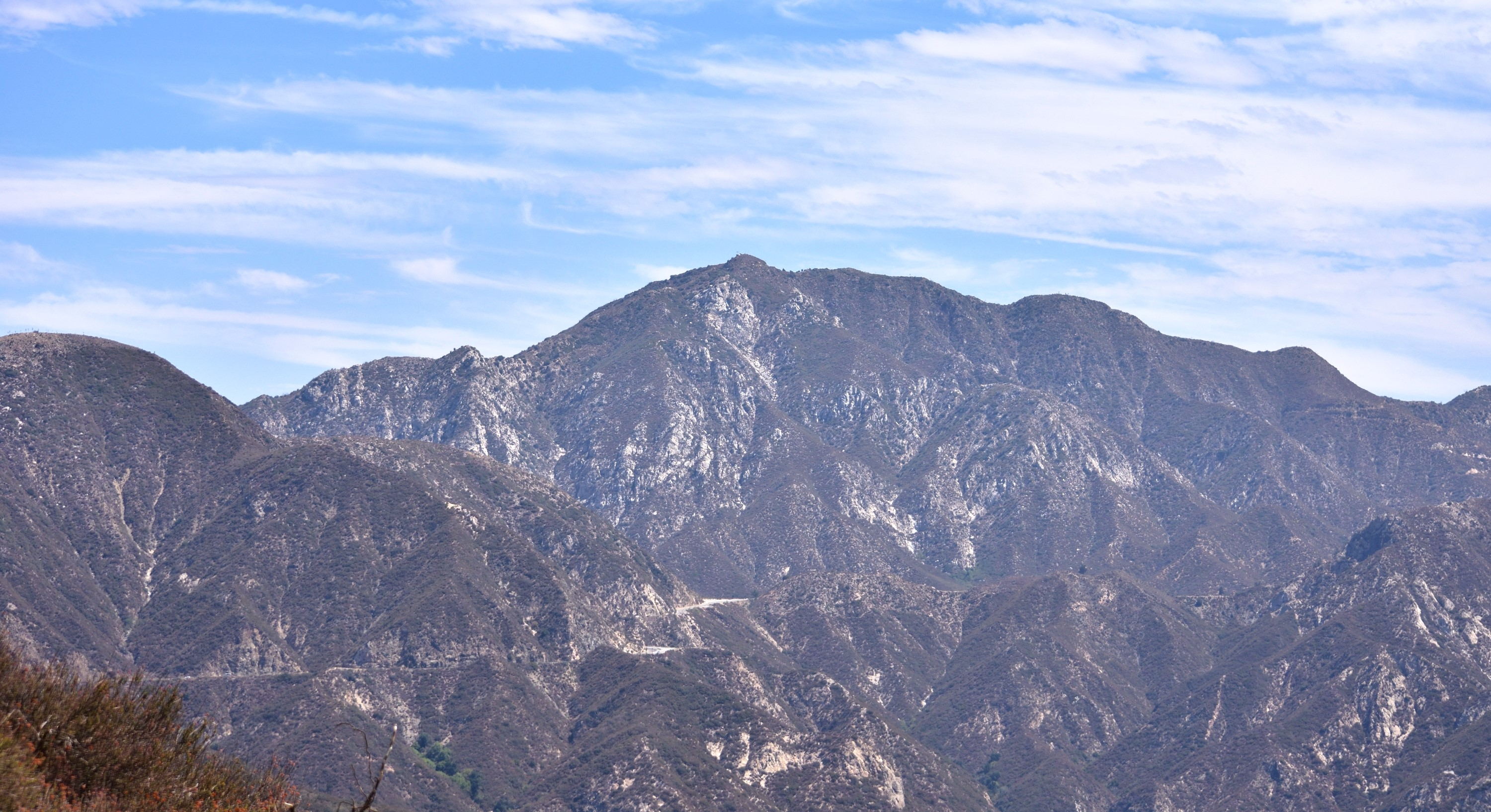
West aspect

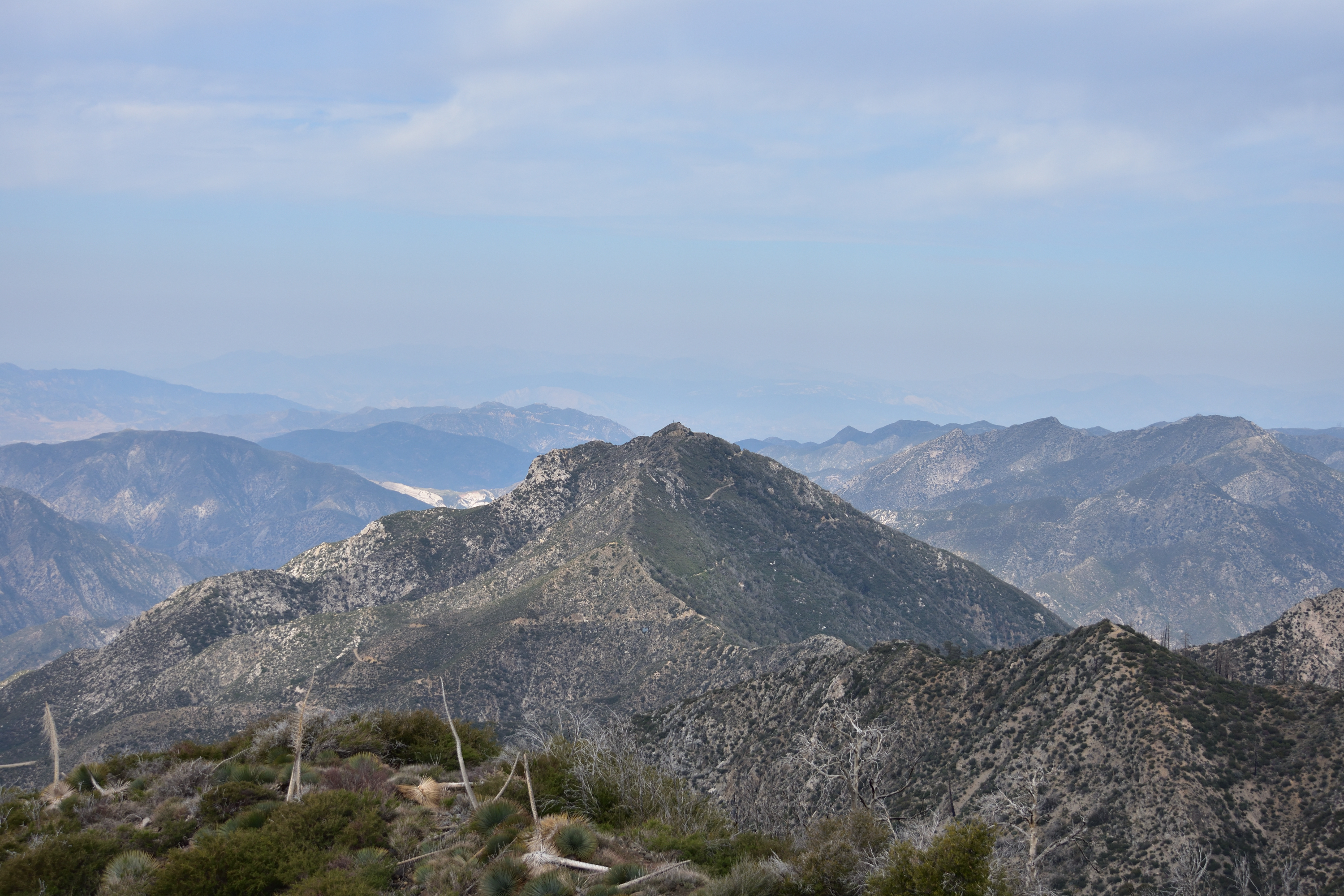
East aspect, from Mount Lawlor

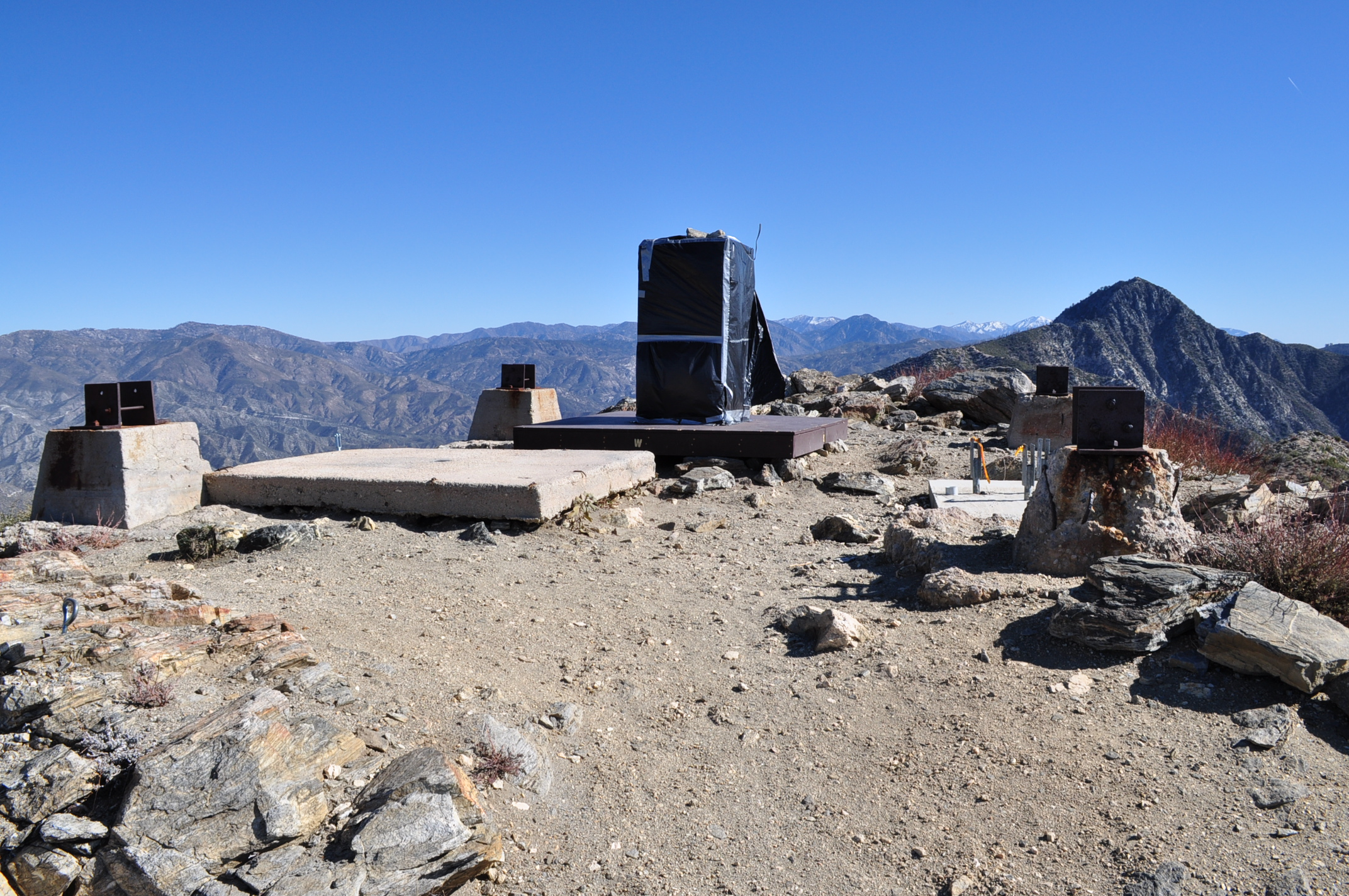
Summit of Josephine Peak showing concrete footing remnants of fire tower that was destroyed in 1976

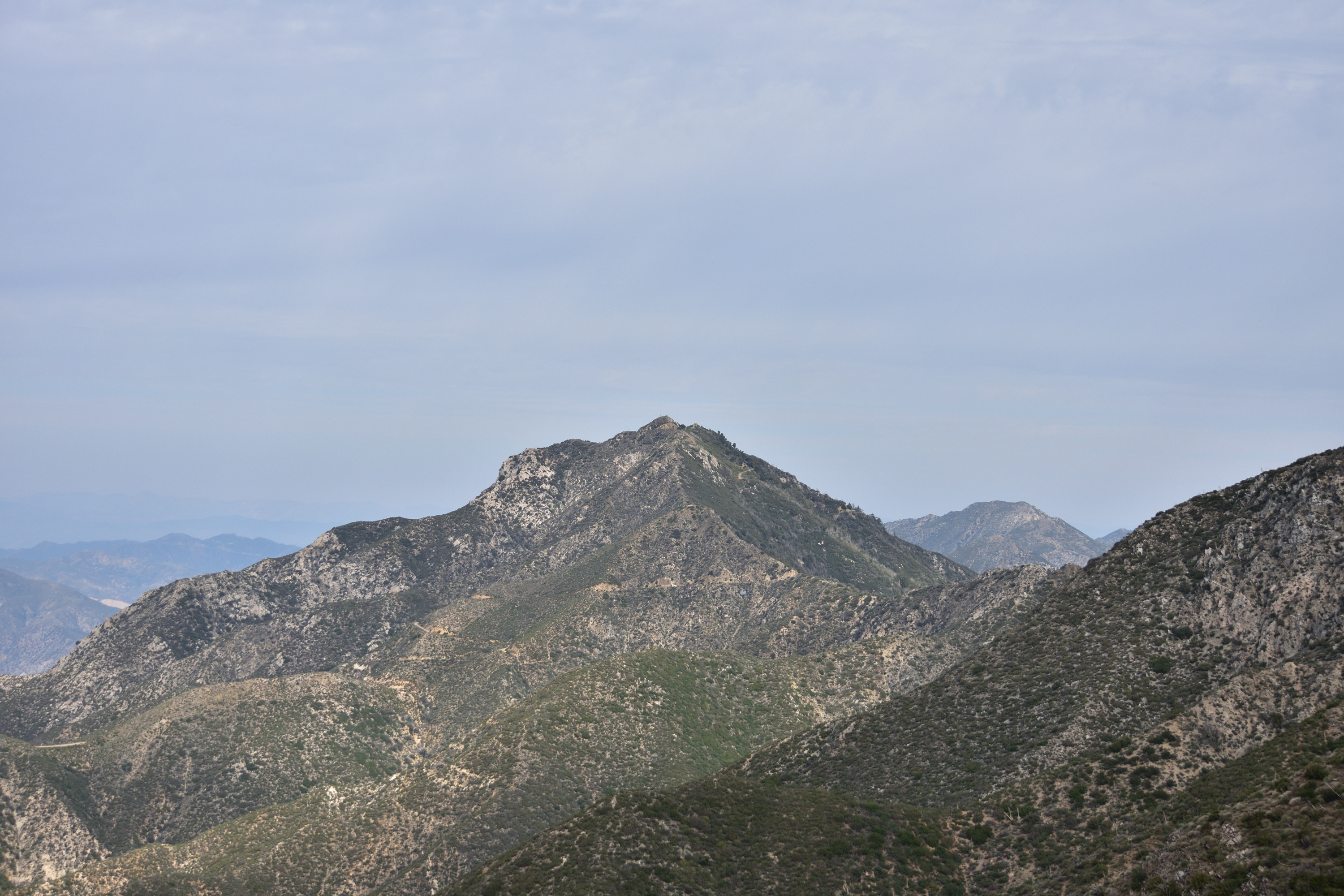
East aspect
