= Folly Castle Historic District =

Historic district in Virginia, United States

- U.S. National Register of Historic Places
- U.S. Historic district
- Virginia Landmarks Register
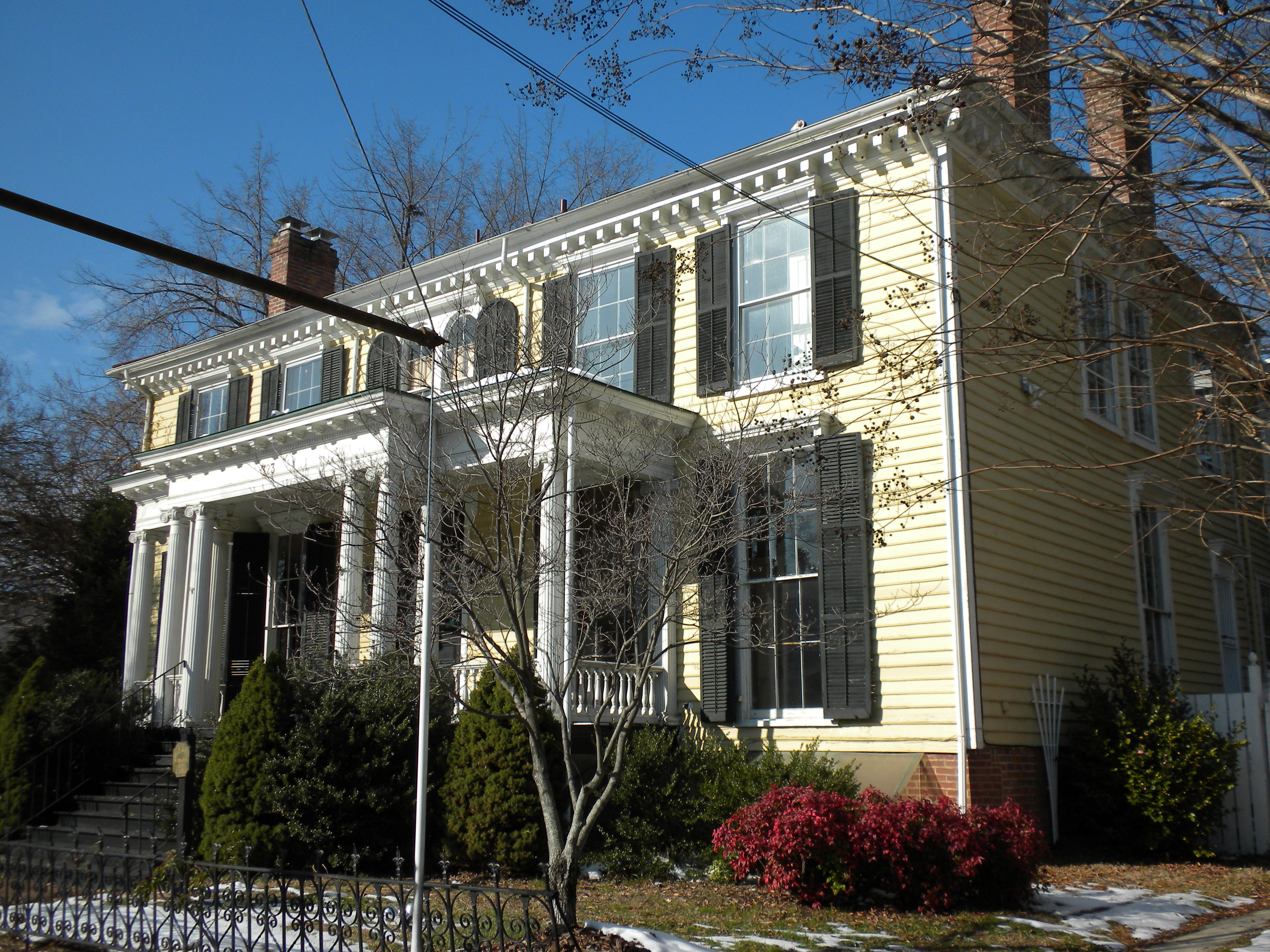
- Folly Castle, December 2009

- Location within Virginia Location within the United States
- Location: Perry and W. Washington Sts.; 235-618 Washington, 235-580 Hinton, 15-37 Guarantee, 18-115 Lafayette and 18-42 Perry Sts.; Roughly along South St. from Commerce St. to Farmer St., Petersburg, Virginia
- Coordinates: 37°13′36″N 77°24′36″W
- Area: 6 acres (2.4 ha)
- Built: 1763
- Architectural style: Late Victorian, Georgian, Federal
- NRHP reference No.: 80004313, 92000343 (Boundary Increase), 99001605 (Boundary Increase)
- VLR No.: 123-0096

Significant dates
- Added to NRHP: July 16, 1980, April 14, 1992 (Boundary Increase), January 10, 2000 (Boundary Increase)
- Designated VLR: February 26, 1979; June 19, 1992, June 16, 1999

Folly Castle Historic District, also known as the West Washington Street Historic District, is a national historic district located at Petersburg, Virginia. The district includes 189 contributing buildings and 1 contributing object located in a predominantly residential section of Petersburg. It includes a varied collection of late 18th-and 19th-century houses and includes notable examples of Late Victorian, Georgian, Italianate, Queen Anne, and Federal style architecture. Notable buildings include Folly Castle / Peter Jones V residence (1763, 1865-1885), McIlwaine-Friend residence (1856-1858), Rambout-Donnan residence (c. 1780-1790), former Petersburg High School (1917-1918), Donnan House (c. 1810), First Baptist Church (1928), Couch House (1850s), and St. John's Episcopal Church (1897). Located in the district and separately listed are the Second Presbyterian Church and Strawberry Hill.

It was listed on the National Register of Historic Places in 1980, with boundary increases in 1992 and 2000.
