= Second Presbyterian Church (Petersburg, Virginia) =

Historic church in Virginia, United States

- U.S. National Register of Historic Places
- U.S. Historic district – Contributing property
- Virginia Landmarks Register
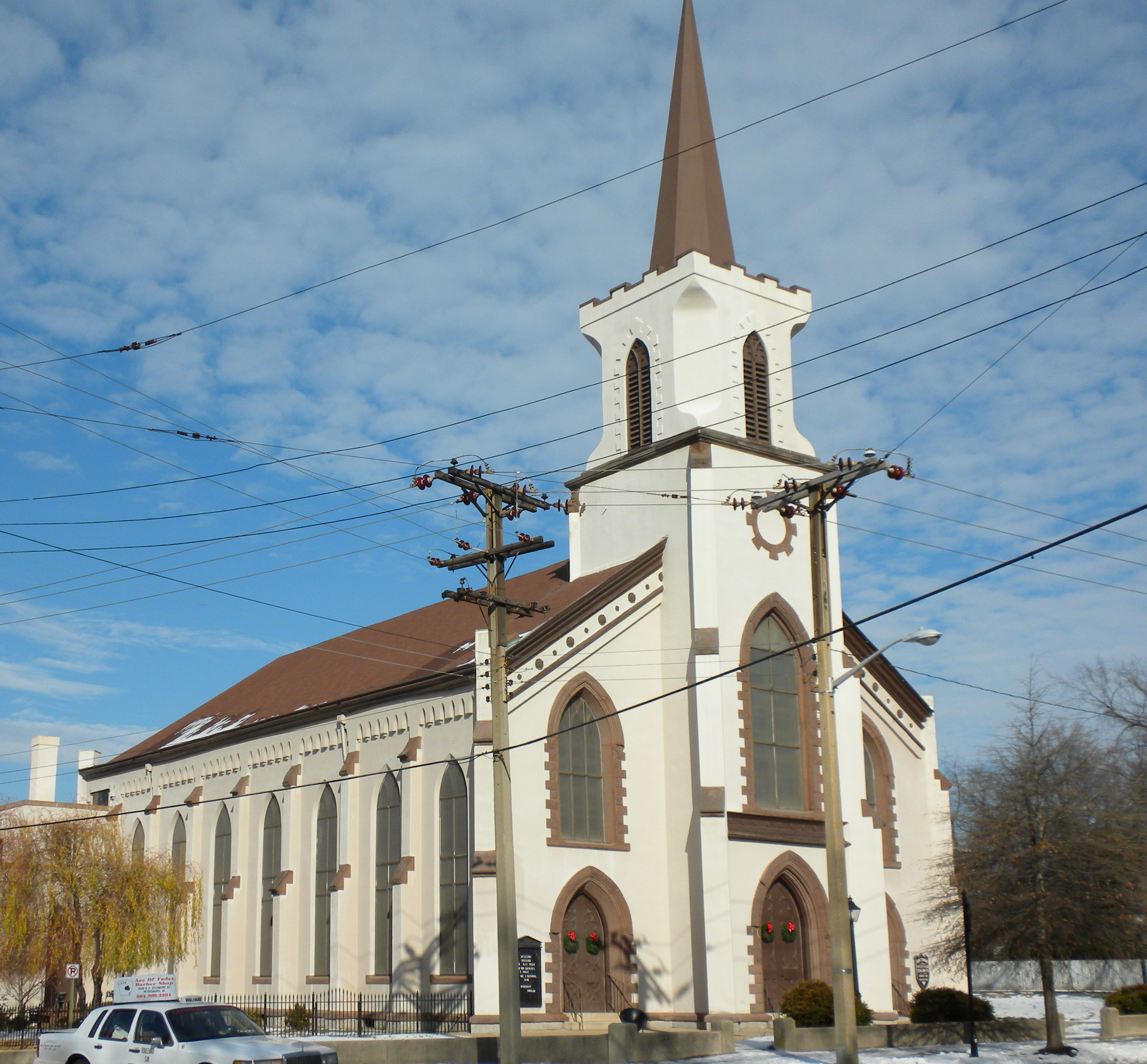

- Location within Virginia Location within the United States
- Location: 419 W. Washington St., Petersburg, Virginia
- Coordinates: 37°13′36″N 77°24′38″W
- Area: less than one acre
- Built: 1861-1862
- Architect: Theodorick Pryor
- Architectural style: Gothic Revival, Early Gothic Revival
- Website: https://www.2pc.org/
- NRHP reference No.: 90002114
- VLR No.: 123-0042

Significant dates
- Added to NRHP: January 14, 1991
- Designated VLR: December 12, 1989

Second Presbyterian Church is a historic Presbyterian church located at 419 W. Washington St., Petersburg, Virginia. It was designed by architect and church pastor Theodorick Pryor and was built in 1861–1862, in the Gothic Revival style. It has stucco covered brick walls and a tower that protrudes from the central bay of its three-bay entry facade. The interior features iron ornamentation, cast by a foundry in Petersburg at the beginning of the American Civil War.

It was listed on the National Register of Historic Places in 1991. It is located in the Folly Castle Historic District.
