= U Pan de Natale =

French bread

U Pan de Natale is a type of bread that is traditionally served during Christmastide in Monaco.

The bread is circular, decorated with a cross formed by four to seven walnuts or hazelnuts. The bread would be placed in the centre of the table during the festive period after being blessed by the fireside and surrounded by olive twigs. The bread would be surrounded by thirteen desserts, and remain there until Epiphany. The bread is also consecrated during Christmas Mass and blessed during Midnight Mass on Christmas Eve at Monaco's Cathedral of Our Lady Immaculate in Monaco-Ville. The Archbishop of Monaco symbolically blesses the breads for Christmas dinner during the offering.

The tradition is at risk of extinction, and attempts are being made to revive it by the Monaco Committee on Traditions with the assistance of Monégasque bakeries.

== See also ==
- Monégasque cuisine
