= Strawberry Hill =

Strawberry Hill may refer to:

== United Kingdom ==
- Strawberry Hill, London, England
  - Strawberry Hill House, Horace Walpole's Gothic revival villa
  - Strawberry Hill railway station
- Strawberry Hill, a rewilded farm at Knotting Green, Bedfordshire

== United States ==
- Strawberry Hill (San Francisco), California
- Strawberry Hill, Cambridge, Massachusetts
- Strawberry Hill (Creagerstown, Maryland)
- Strawberry Hill (Edenton, North Carolina)
- Strawberry Hill (Enfield, North Carolina)
- Strawberry Hill (Kansas City, Kansas)
- Strawberry Hill (Rhinebeck, New York)
- Strawberry Hill Nature Preserve, Fairfield, Pennsylvania
- Strawberry Hill (Petersburg, Virginia)

== Other countries ==
- Strawberry Hill, one of the Penang Hills in Malaysia, and an historic house there
- Strawberry Hill (hotel), a hotel in Jamaica
- Strawberry Hill, U.S. Virgin Islands, a settlement on the island of Saint Croix
- Old Farm, Strawberry Hill, a heritage listed place in Western Australia

== See also ==
- Strawberry Hill Boys
- Strawberry Hill Elementary School
- Strawberry Hill Estates, Alberta
- Strawberry Hill Players
- Strawberry Hill Press
- Strawberry Hills, New South Wales, an urban locality in Sydney, Australia
