= Strawberry Mountain =

Peak name

Strawberry Mountain may refer to one of 14 peaks in the United States:

Name	USGS link	State	County	USGS map	Coordinates	Elevation	
Strawberry Mountain		Arizona	Gila	Pine	34°22′57″N 111°29′22″W	6,804 ft	2,074 m
Strawberry Mountain		Georgia	Walker	Subligna	34°35′50″N 085°10′25″W	1,378 ft	420 m
Strawberry Mountain		Idaho	Bonner	Mount Pend Oreille	48°27′54″N 116°12′57″W	5,673 ft	1,729 m
Strawberry Mountain		Minnesota	Clearwater	Tulaby Lake	47°14′26″N 095°32′57″W	1,827 ft	557 m
Strawberry Mountain		Montana	Flathead	Jewel Basin	48°12′47″N 113°58′53″W	6,204 ft	1,891 m
Strawberry Mountain		Montana	Granite	Ravenna	46°37′44″N 113°32′33″W	6,808 ft	2,075 m
Strawberry Mountain		Oregon	Grant	Strawberry Mountain	44°18′45″N 118°43′00″W	9,019 ft	2,749 m
Strawberry Mountain		Oregon	Lincoln	Toledo South	44°34′53″N 123°54′44″W	659 ft	201 m
Strawberry Mountain		Tennessee	Carter	Iron Mountain Gap	36°09′36″N 082°07′33″W	4,419 ft	1,347 m
Strawberry Mountain		Washington	Skamania	Cowlitz Falls	46°23′02″N 122°02′11″W	5,699 ft	1,737 m
Strawberry Mountain		Washington	Okanogan	Strawberry Mountain	48°27′04″N 118°56′14″W	5,843 ft	1,781 m
Strawberry Mountain		Washington	Okanogan	Mount Bonaparte	48°50′29″N 119°02′06″W	4,715 ft	1,437 m
Strawberry Mountain		Washington	Okanogan	Chesaw	48°58′17″N 119°05′10″W	4,373 ft	1,333 m
Strawberry Mountain		Wyoming	Weston	Inyan Kara Mountain	44°10′17″N 104°15′58″W	5,869 ft	1,789 m

== See also ==
- Strawberry Peak
