= Monrovia Peak =

Mountain in California, United States

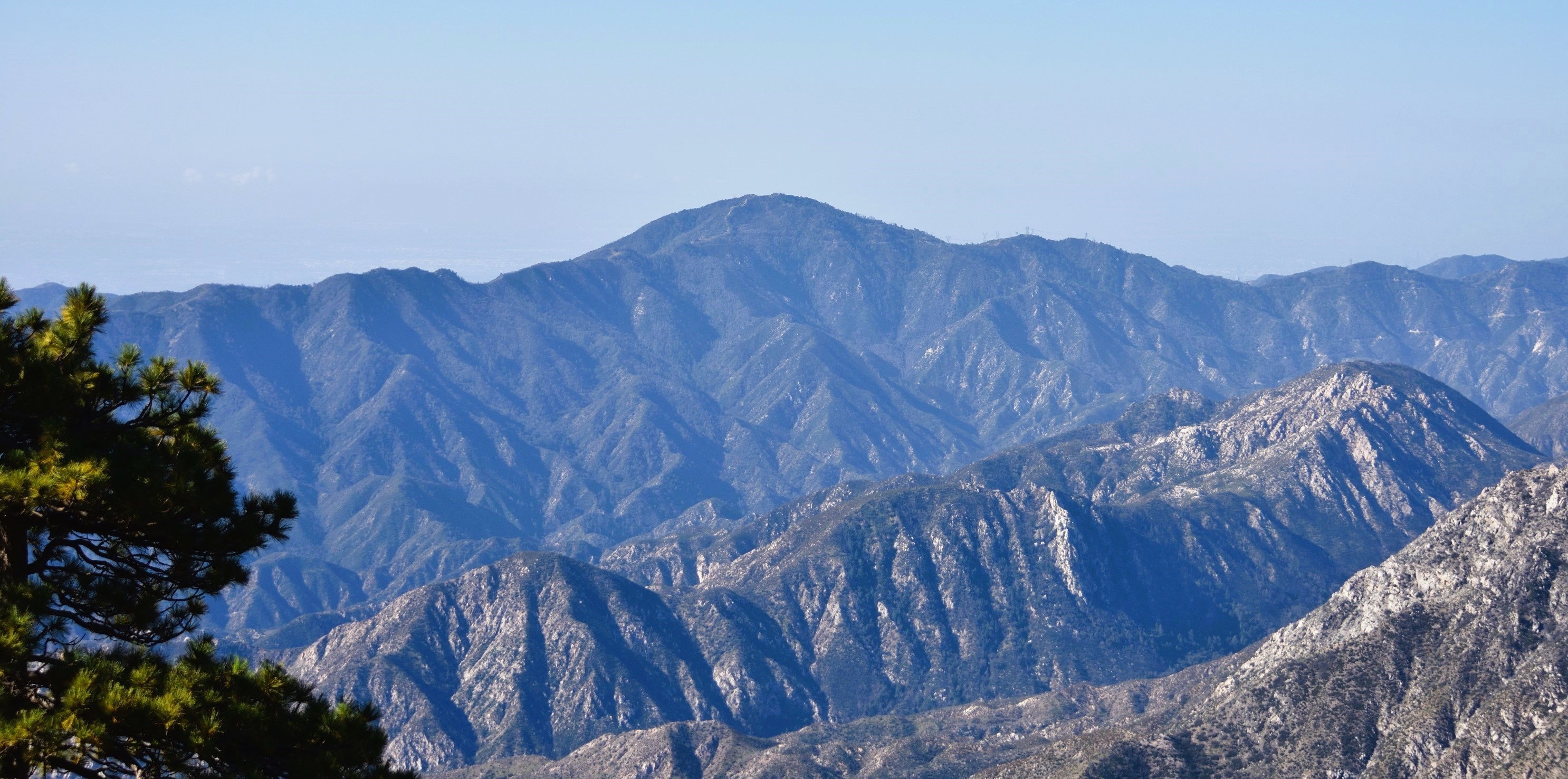
- North aspect

Highest point
- Elevation: 5,412 ft (1,650 m)
- Prominence: 1,503 ft (458 m)
- Parent peak: Occidental Peak (5,732 ft)
- Isolation: 5.07 mi (8.16 km)
- Listing: Hundred Peaks Section
- Coordinates: 34°12′48″N 117°58′10″W

Naming
- Etymology: William Norton Monroe

Geography
- Location within California Location within the United States
- Country: United States
- State: California
- County: Los Angeles
- Protected area: San Gabriel Mountains National Monument
- Parent range: San Gabriel Mountains
- Topo map: USGS Azusa

Geology
- Mountain type: Fault block

Climbing
- Easiest route: Trail

Monrovia Peak is a 5,412-foot-elevation (1,650-meter) mountain summit located in the San Gabriel Mountains, in Los Angeles County, California, United States.

== Description ==
Monrovia Peak is set within San Gabriel Mountains National Monument, approximately four miles (6.4 km) northeast of the community of Monrovia and 20 miles (32 km) northeast of downtown Los Angeles. The May 2, 2024, expansion of the San Gabriel Mountains National Monument by President Biden brought Monrovia Peak within the boundary of the monument. Topographic relief is significant as the summit rises over 1,800 feet (549 meters) above Cold Springs Canyon in approximately one mile. Reaching the summit involves 12 miles of hiking with 5,300 feet of elevation gain. This mountain's toponym has been officially adopted by the U.S. Board on Geographic Names, and it is named in association with the city of Monrovia, of which William N. Monroe (1841–1935) is Monrovia's eponym.

== Climate ==
According to the Köppen climate classification system, Monrovia Peak is located in a continental climate zone (Dsa) with mostly dry summers (except for scattered summer thunderstorms) and cold, wet winters. Most weather fronts originating in the Pacific Ocean travel east toward the San Gabriel Mountains. As fronts approach, they are forced upward by the peaks (orographic lift), causing them to drop their moisture onto the range. Precipitation runoff from this mountain drains into the San Gabriel River watershed.

== Gallery ==
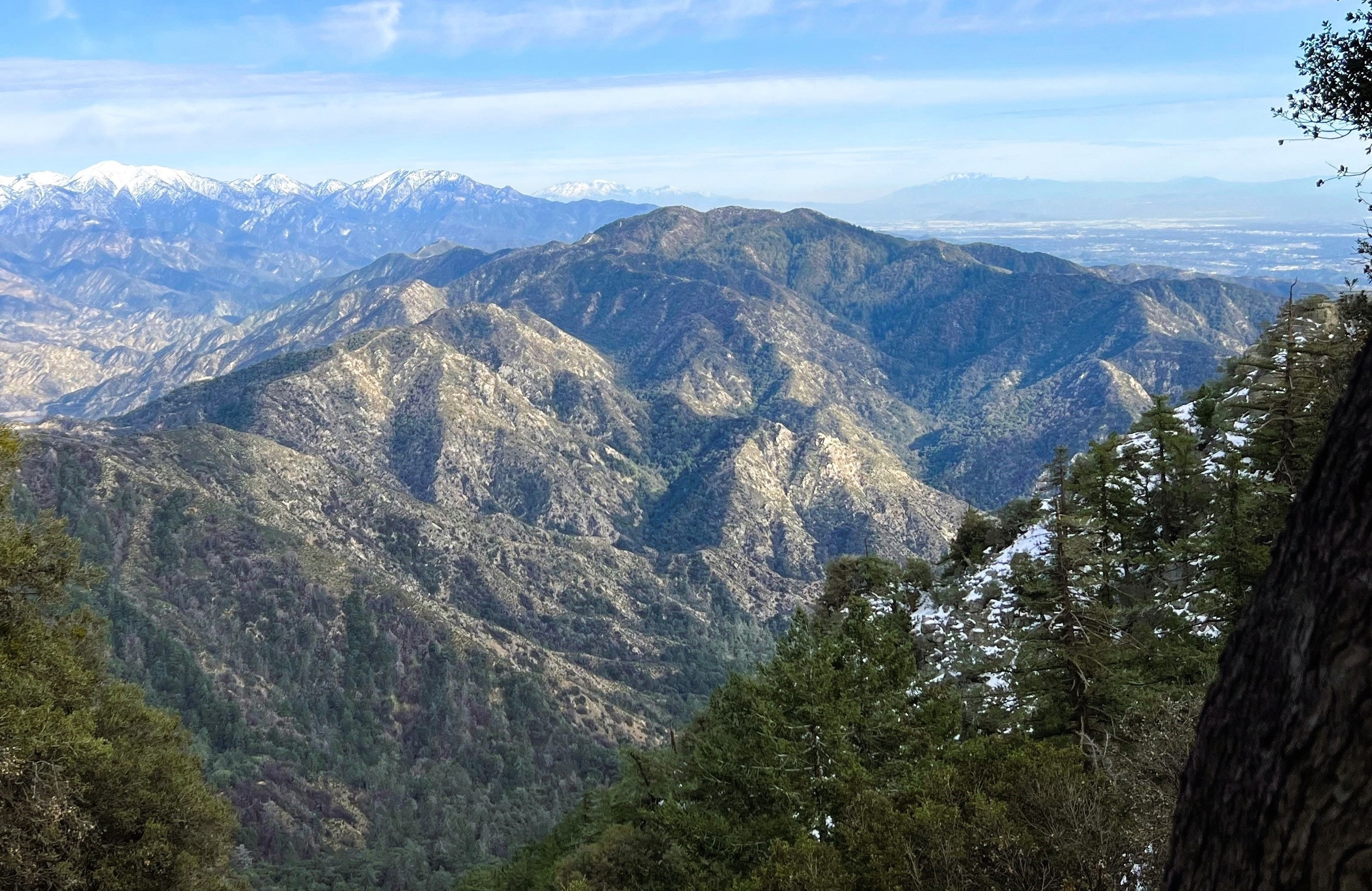
West aspect viewed from Mount Wilson

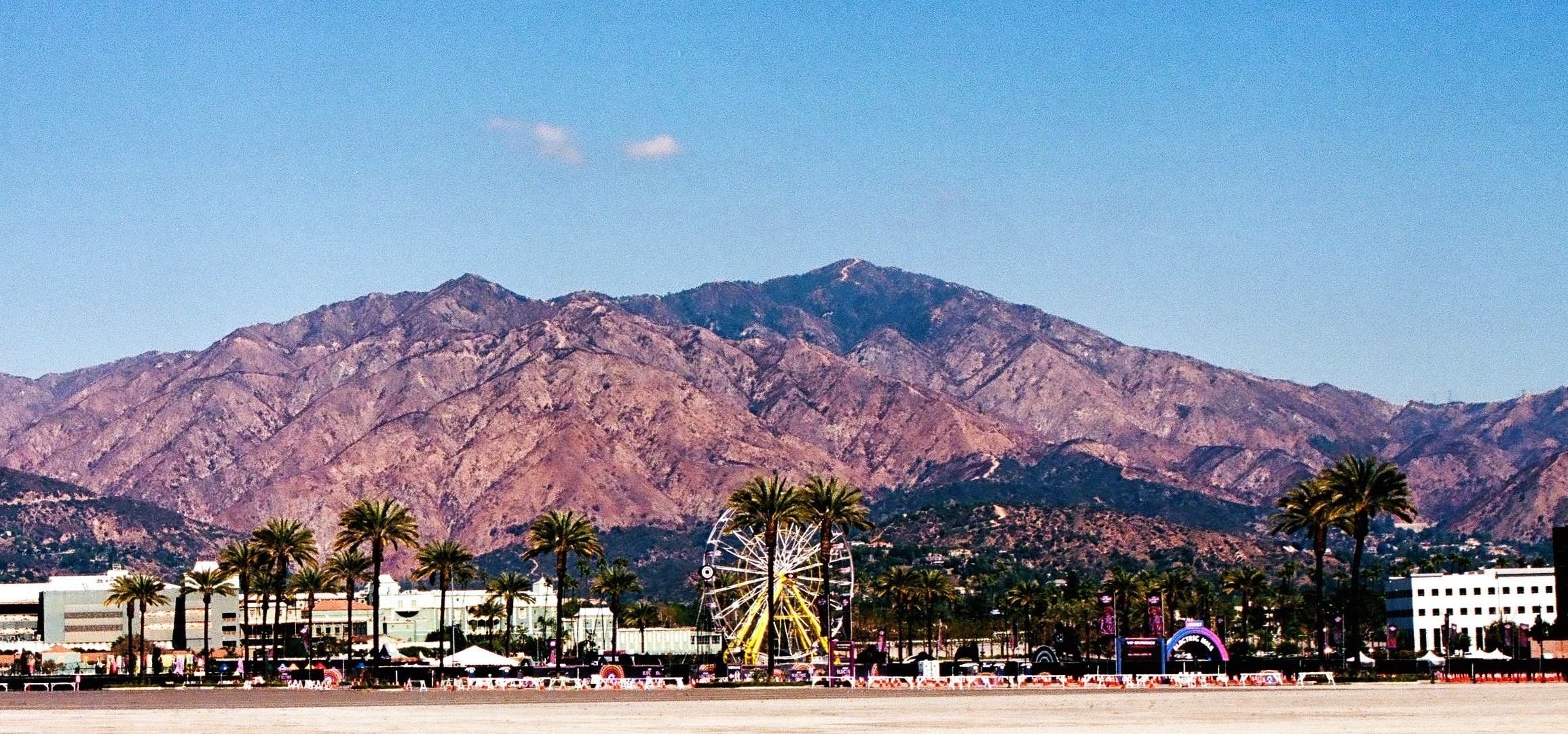
Southwest aspect of Monrovia Peak viewed from Santa Anita.
