= Strawberry Island (Rosario Strait, Washington) =

Island in Washington, United States

Coordinates: 48°33′42.3″N 122°44′8.97″W

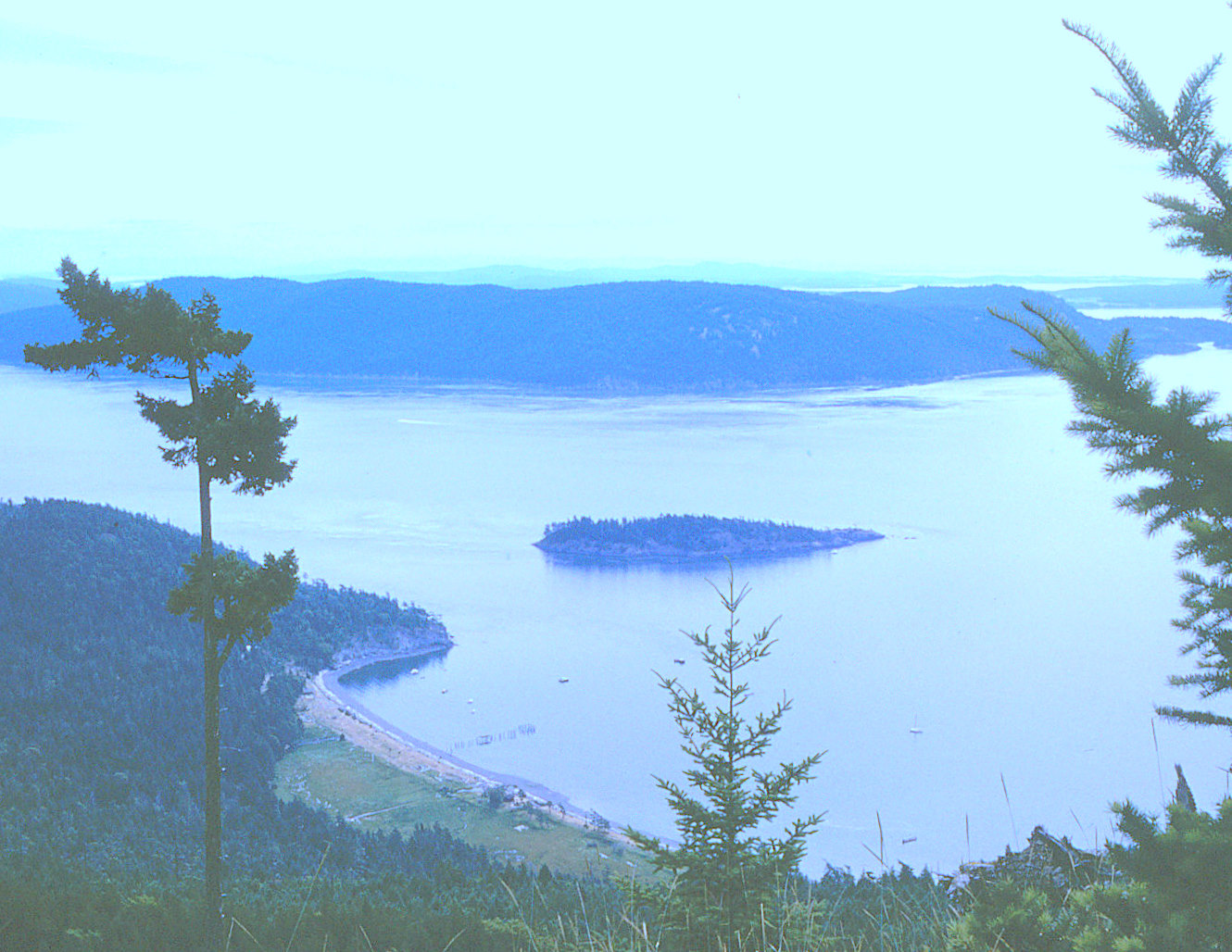
- Strawberry Island viewed from Cypress Island

- Location within Washington (state)

Geography
- Location: Rosario Strait
- Archipelago: San Juan Islands

Administration
- United States
- State: Washington
- County: Skagit

Location of Strawberry Bay relative to Cypress Island

Strawberry Island is a small island in Skagit County of the U.S. state of Washington. It is located in Rosario Strait near Cypress Island and closes Strawberry Bay.

The island is managed by the Washington Department of Natural Resources.

Strawberry Island has long been popular with kayakers. In 2010, due to budget cuts, the Department of Natural Resources prohibited overnight camping.

George Vancouver named Strawberry Bay and Cypress Island in 1792, but left this island nameless.
