= Strawberry Fields =

Strawberry Fields may refer to:

== Places ==
- Strawberry Field, an orphanage in Liverpool dating back to 1870, now a visitor attraction
- Strawberry Fields, an area of Ellesmere Port adjacent to Strawberry Park, Cheshire
- Strawberry Field (airport), a private airport in Atlantic County, New Jersey, United States
- Strawberry Fields (memorial), a memorial to John Lennon in Central Park, New York, dedicated in 1985
- Strawberry Fields (Guantanamo), a secret CIA compound built in 2003 at Guantanamo Bay

== Art, entertainment, and media ==
=== Music ===
- "Campo de Morango" (2023), a song by Luísa Sonza
- "Strawberry Fields Forever" (1967), a song by the Beatles, inspired by an orphanage (see above)
- Strawberry Fields (Canadian festival), a Woodstock-esque rock festival held in Mosport, Canada, August 6–9, 1970
- Strawberry Fields (Indian festival), an annual rock festival hosted in Bangalore by the National Law School of India University
- Strawberry Fields (New Zealand festival), a former annual music festival in New Zealand

=== Theatre ===
- Strawberry Fields (play), a 1977 theatre play by Stephen Poliakoff
- Strawberry Fields, a 1999 opera by Michael Torke

=== Cinema ===
- Strawberry Fields (1997 film), a film by Rea Tajiri
- Strawberry Fields (2006 film), a documentary on Palestinian strawberry growers in Gaza
- Strawberry Fields (2011 film), a psycho-drama film by Frances Lea and Judith Johnson
- Strawberry Fields (character), a fictional agent in the 2008 James Bond film Quantum of Solace

=== Literature ===
- Strawberry Fields (2007), the name for the US edition of Marina Lewycka's novel Two Caravans

== Other ==
- Strawberry Fields globe amaranth, a garden flower
