= Wild strawberries =

Wild Strawberries or Wild Strawberry may refer to:

== Plants ==
- Wild strawberries, a common name for uncultivated species in the strawberry genus Fragaria, especially:
  - Fragaria vesca, the common wild strawberry in Europe, also occurring in North America
  - Fragaria virginiana, the common wild strawberry in North America

== Politics ==
- Wild Strawberries Movement, a student protest movement in Taiwan

== Film ==
- Wild Strawberries (film), a 1957 film by Ingmar Bergman
- Mountain Strawberries, a 1982 South Korean film also known as Wild Strawberries

== Music ==
- Wild Strawberries (band), a Canadian pop music group
- Wild Strawberries, the name adopted by Yugoslav hard rock and heavy metal band Divlje Jagode during their short-lasting international career
- Wild Strawberries (album), a 2015 studio album by American psychedelic rock and space rock band Eternal Tapestry
- "Wild Strawberries" (song), a 2007 song by Australian group Pnau from their eponymous album

== See also ==
- Strawberry (disambiguation)
- Grass and Wild Strawberries
