= Strawberry Hill (Petersburg, Virginia) =

Historic house in Virginia, United States

- U.S. National Register of Historic Places
- U.S. Historic district – Contributing property
- Virginia Landmarks Register
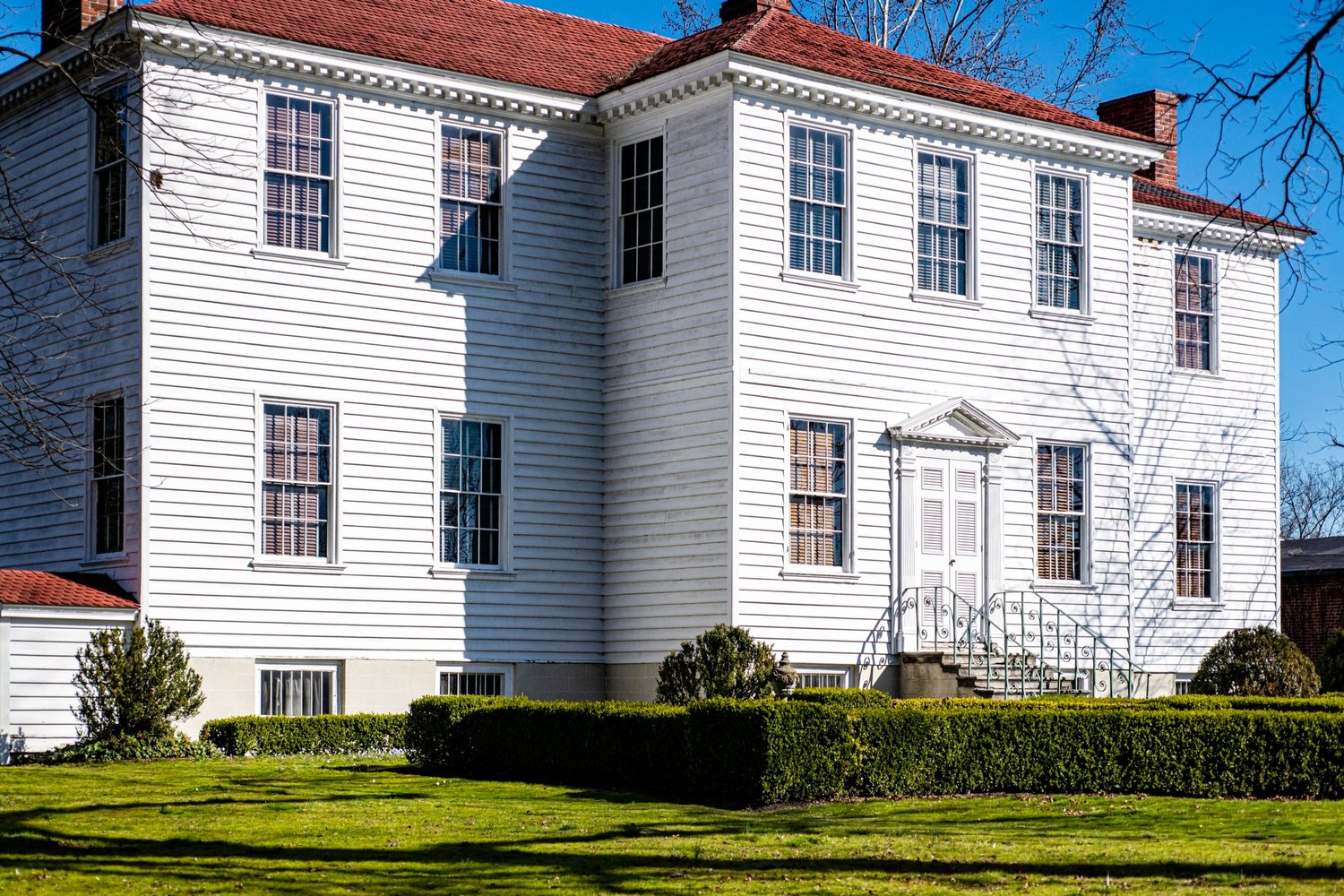

- Location within Virginia Location within the United States
- Location: 235 Hinton Street Petersburg, Virginia
- Coordinates: 37°13′43″N 77°24′30″W
- Area: less than one acre
- Built: 1792; 234 years ago
- Architectural style: Federal
- NRHP reference No.: 74002239
- VLR No.: 123-0086

Significant dates
- Added to NRHP: December 23, 1974
- Designated VLR: November 19, 1974

Strawberry Hill is a historic home located in Petersburg, Virginia, built by tobacco warehouse owner, William Barksdale, in 1792. Strawberry Hill, designed with a tripartite Palladian form, is an early example of a Virginia dwelling built in the neoclassical style and includes several notable architectural features. It is now an inn and event venue.

Strawberry Hill is listed in the U.S. National Register of Historic Places and the Virginia Landmarks Register, and is located in the Folly Castle Historic District.

== History & Architecture ==
About 1792, tobacconist William Barksdale constructed the house in an elaborate, tripartite form that became common in Southside, Virginia, and into eastern North Carolina around 1800. The house is located adjacent to a tobacco warehouse Barksdale built earlier, in 1770, which played a large role in the mercantile development of Petersburg. Barksdale laid out his house with a two-story central section flanked by one-story wings on either side. The pavilion contained a generous entry with staircase on the first story, with a grand drawing room behind it. Chambers were located in the wings and on the upper floor. Local merchant, William Henry Haxall purchased the house in 1800 and enlarged it in 1815-16, by deepening the wings and raising them to two stories. Haxall famously gambled his fortune on horse racing and put up Strawberry Hill as collateral for debt, which had risen to $5,842 in 1827 when he became indebted to George Keith Taylor, brother-in-law to Chief Justice John Marshall. The property was later sold to James McIlwaine and passed to his three children: John, Mary and Sally McIlwaine when he died intestate in 1857. Around 1880, under new ownership, the house was divided into three units, with an off-center front door and entrance. Beginning in the 1980s, Strawberry Hill was restored into a single residence. It is now an inn and event venue.

The house, a Federal style tripartite structure, was listed in the U.S. National Register of Historic Places and the Virginia Landmarks Register in 1974. The house is notable for its use of quirked, neoclassical moldings in a pre-1800 context. Other notable features include King of Prussia stone steps with hand-forged, wrought iron railings elaborated with scrollwork, that lead to a delicately carved pedimented doorway. The treatment of the drawing room chimneypiece flanked by decorative, shell backed arched niches is also remarkable.

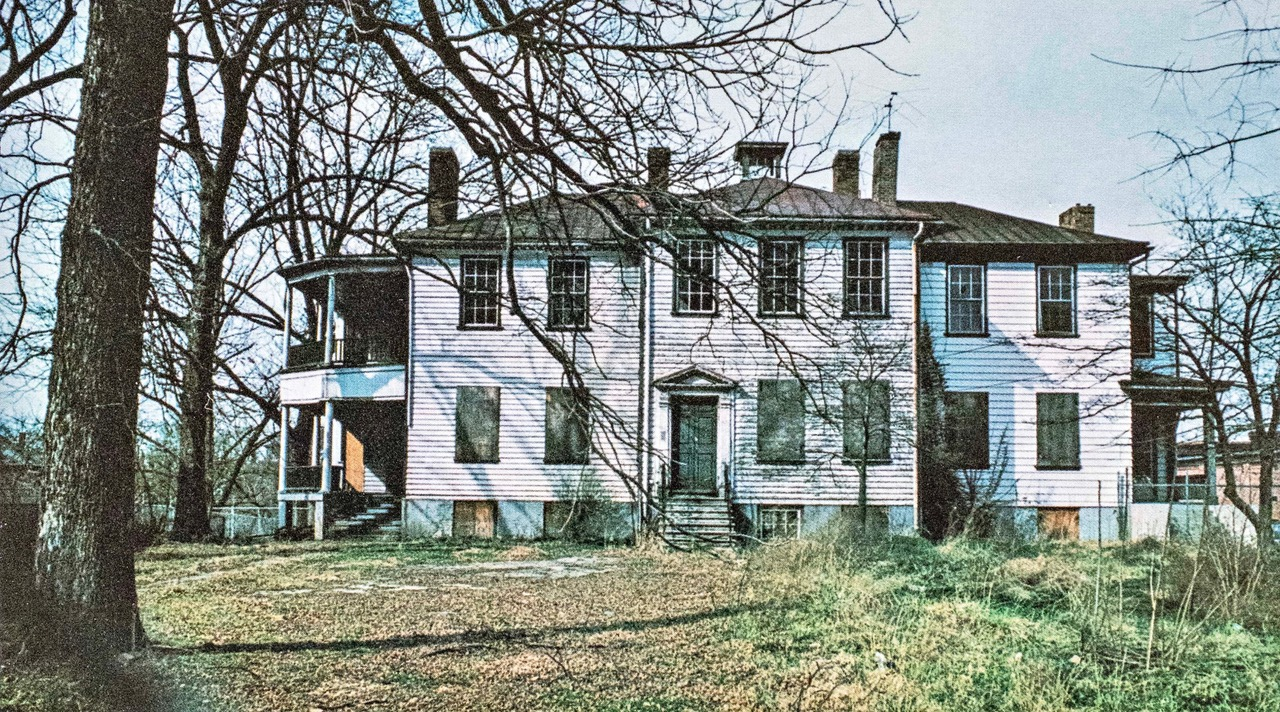
Strawberry Hill ca. 1976 prior to restoration efforts

=== Notable Guests ===
Strawberry Hill has received notable guests including:

- John Randolph of Roanoke a Virginia planter and politician who served in the House of Representatives and Senate
- William Meade the third Bishop of Virginia

== See also ==
- DHR: Virginia Department of Historic Resource
- The Inn at Strawberry Hill
