= William Newton Monroe =

A founder of the city of Monrovia, California

William Newton Monroe, age 21 in 1862.

William Newton Monroe (1841–1935) was a school teacher, banker, hotel manager, mayor, council member, real estate developer, broker, railroad contractor and railroad superintendent and a founder of the city of Monrovia, California.

In 1875 Lucky Baldwin's Los Angeles Investment Company began subdividing and selling parcels from many of his ranchos. In 1883, 240 acres (970,000 m²) of Rancho Santa Anita were sold to William Monroe for $30,000. Additional parcels of Rancho Santa Anita were sold to Edward F. Spence, John D. Bicknell, James F. Crank, and Jeremiah F. Falvey. The men then joined their properties to form the Monrovia Tract with the first subdivision being the Town of Monrovia.

In 1935 Monroe died at the age of 94. He is buried in Live Oak Memorial Park on Duarte Road in Monrovia.

== Vocation ==
Monroe served in the American Civil War with the 1st Iowa Cavalry Company I and the 7th Regiment Iowa Volunteer Cavalry Company D. He earned the ranks of Lieutenant, 1st Lieutenant, and Major. He resigned from Cavalry on August 23, 1864. His next job was as the superintendent of construction for the Southern Pacific Railroad starting in Omaha and building west. After the line to Los Angeles was completed he moved to Los Angeles with his family. In 1880 he became a member of the Los Angeles City Council. In 1882 he departed Los Angeles to work on construction for another rail line in Mexico, returning in 1884. After doing well with the two construction projects, he purchased 210 acres of Rancho Santa Anita from E.J. “Lucky” Baldwin. He lived in a tent until a home was constructed. He called it “The Oaks”. The home is still standing at 250 North Primrose Avenue. Myrtle Avenue in Monrovia, the city's main street, is named for Monroe's oldest daughter, Myrtle. In 1907 he went to the Klondike gold fields and built the first Alaskan railroad. This line ran from Nome to Anvil Creek.

== Public service ==
Monroe was elected to a one-year term on the Los Angeles Common Council on December 5, 1879, serving until December 11, 1880. After the city changed its election system from at-large to electoral districts, he was reelected from the 1st Ward on December 6, 1880; he resigned on June 18, 1881.
