= Barbajuan =

Southern European appetizer

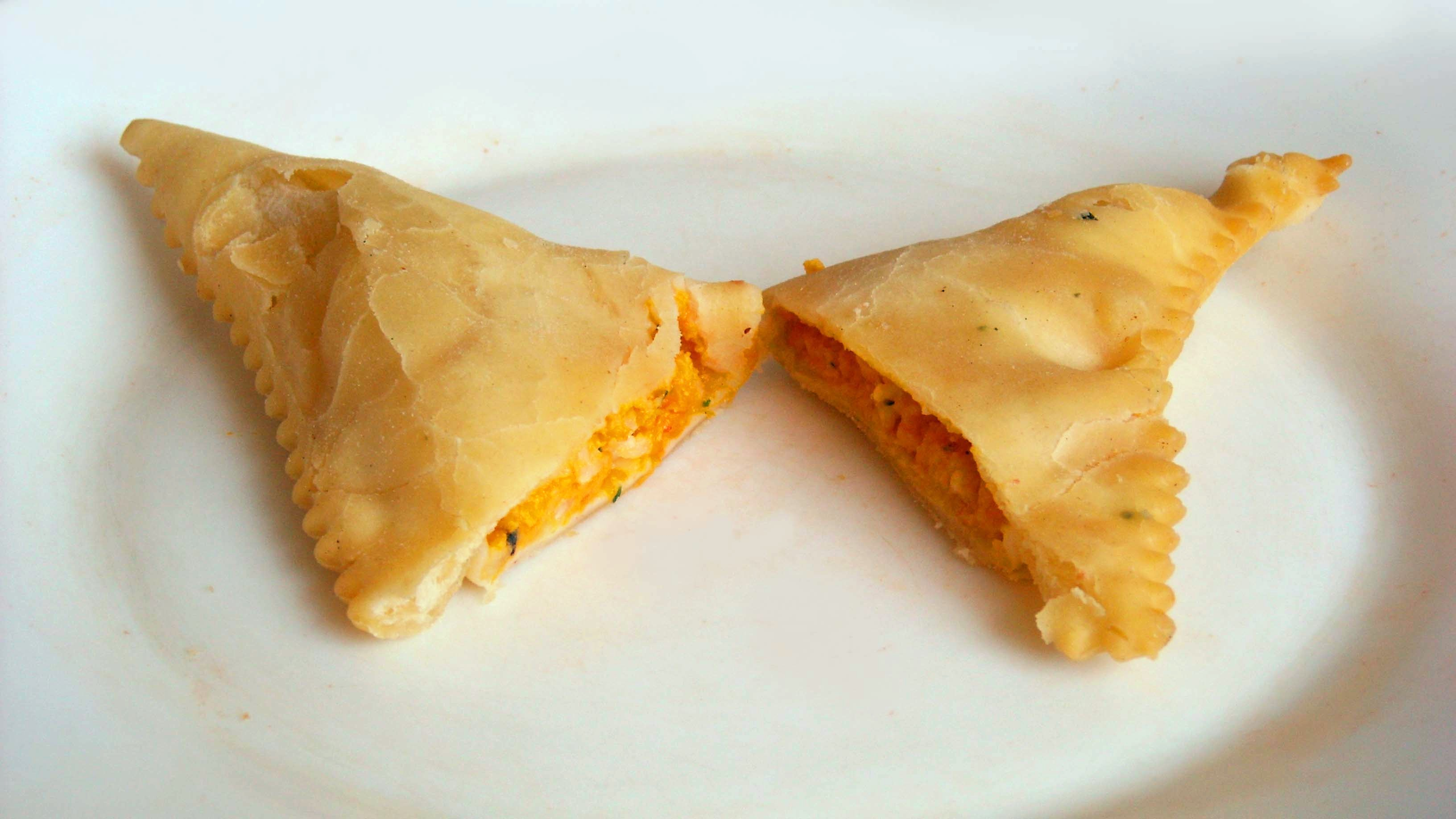
- Alternative names: Barbagiuan
- Course: Hors d'oeuvre
- Place of origin: Western part of Italian Riviera, Monaco and eastern part of French Riviera
- Main ingredients: Swiss chard, spinach, ricotta, Parmigiano-Reggiano, onions, leeks, egg whites, pastry (flour, eggs, olive oil)

Barbajuan (also spelled barbagiuan or barbagiuai) is an appetizer mainly found in the eastern part of the French Riviera, in the western part of Liguria and in Monaco. A kind of fritter stuffed with Swiss chard, rice and ricotta, among other ingredients. In Monaco, where it is especially eaten on the national day, 19 November. The word means Uncle John in western Ligurian and Monégasque dialect. Other fillings can include pumpkin, minced meat, leeks or eggs.

== See also ==
- List of hors d'oeuvre
- List of stuffed dishes
