= Wichita Monrovians =

Negro league baseball team in the 1920s

- Sport: Baseball
- League: Colored Western League (1922) "Barnstorming" (After 1922)
- Based in: Wichita, Kansas

The Wichita Monrovians were a Negro league baseball team in the 1920s. The team is most notable for beating the Ku Klux Klan in a baseball game in 1925. They were formerly known as the Black Wonders and were later incorporated as the Monrovian Corporation. The team was named after the Liberian capital Monrovia, a settlement originally settled by African-American Freedmen with aid from the American Colonization Society.

== Game against the Ku Klux Klan ==
During the so-called nadir of American race relations, a time of some of the largest racial violence in the country since the civil war, the Second Ku Klux Klan grew greatly, often outside of the South, where the Klan is typically stereotyped as residing in. The American Midwest and Great Plains saw some of the largest KKK chapters, spurred on by the Emigration of African-Americans from the south as well as the immigration of Catholics from Europe, namely Italy and Ireland. Despite their power, the Klan was still seen as an outside force and the Kansan government had laws in place that de-facto outlawed the Klan, although segregation and Jim Crow laws had been the norm in the city for almost two decades at that point. Wanting to improve their image, the local Wichita Klan, with upwards of 5000 members, proposed a match against the Monrovians. The game was held on Sunday, June 21, 1925. To further try and improve their image, two white Irish Catholics, W. W. "Irish" Garrety and Dan Dwyer, served as umpires, as the Second Klan was as vehemently anti-Catholic as it was white supremacist, if not more so in the state of Kansas, where nativist sentiments were high and Jim Crow was already in place. The game between the Monrovians and Wichita Klan Number Six went on without any violent incidents, with the Monrovians winning 10–8.
