= Strawberry Peak =

Mountain in southern California, United States

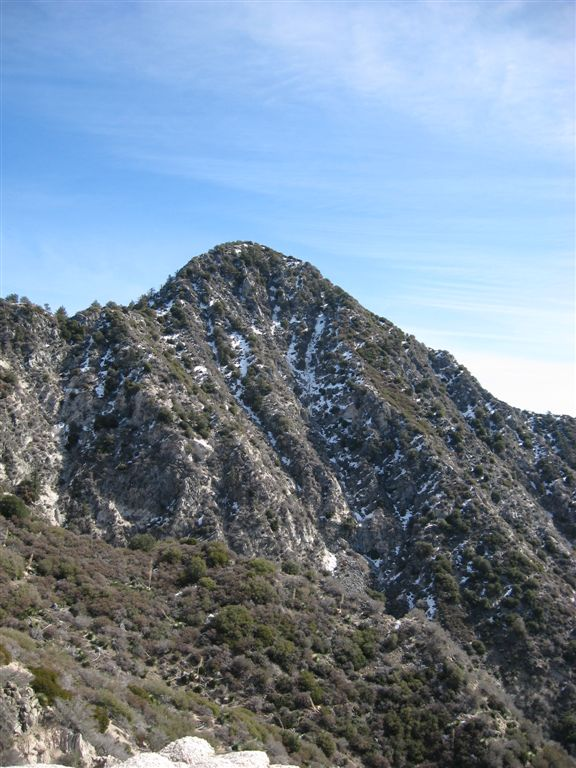
- Strawberry Peak's west face.

Highest point
- Elevation: 6,167 ft (1,880 m) NAVD 88
- Listing: Hundred Peaks Section
- Coordinates: 34°17′01″N 118°07′13″W

Geography
- Location within California Location within the United States
- Location: Los Angeles County California, US
- Parent range: San Gabriel Mountains
- Topo map: USGS Chilao Flat

Strawberry Peak (6,164 ft or 1,879 m) is a prominent peak in the San Gabriel Mountains of Los Angeles County, California. It is located about 10 miles (16 km) north of Pasadena, and 28 miles (45 km) from Los Angeles, along the Angeles Crest Highway. Strawberry Peak is the tallest of the front range peaks, being three feet higher than nearby San Gabriel Peak. Both can be widely seen from greater Los Angeles and the San Gabriel Valley, and are popular with hikers. Other prominent nearby peaks include Josephine Peak and Mount Wilson. Strawberry Peak was named by mountaineers over a century ago, who felt the peak resembled an enormous upside-down strawberry.

The peak can be ascended on the east side as a 7.2-mile round-trip trail walk using Strawberry Peak Trail, which begins near the Red Box Picnic Area, or from the west as a class 3 scramble from a trailhead near the entrance to the Switzer Picnic Site.

The area was closed to the public as a result of the Station Fire. However, the last closure order expired on May 24, 2014. Remaining fire damage in the area is minimal.

It is especially common to see Rattlesnakes in the area.
