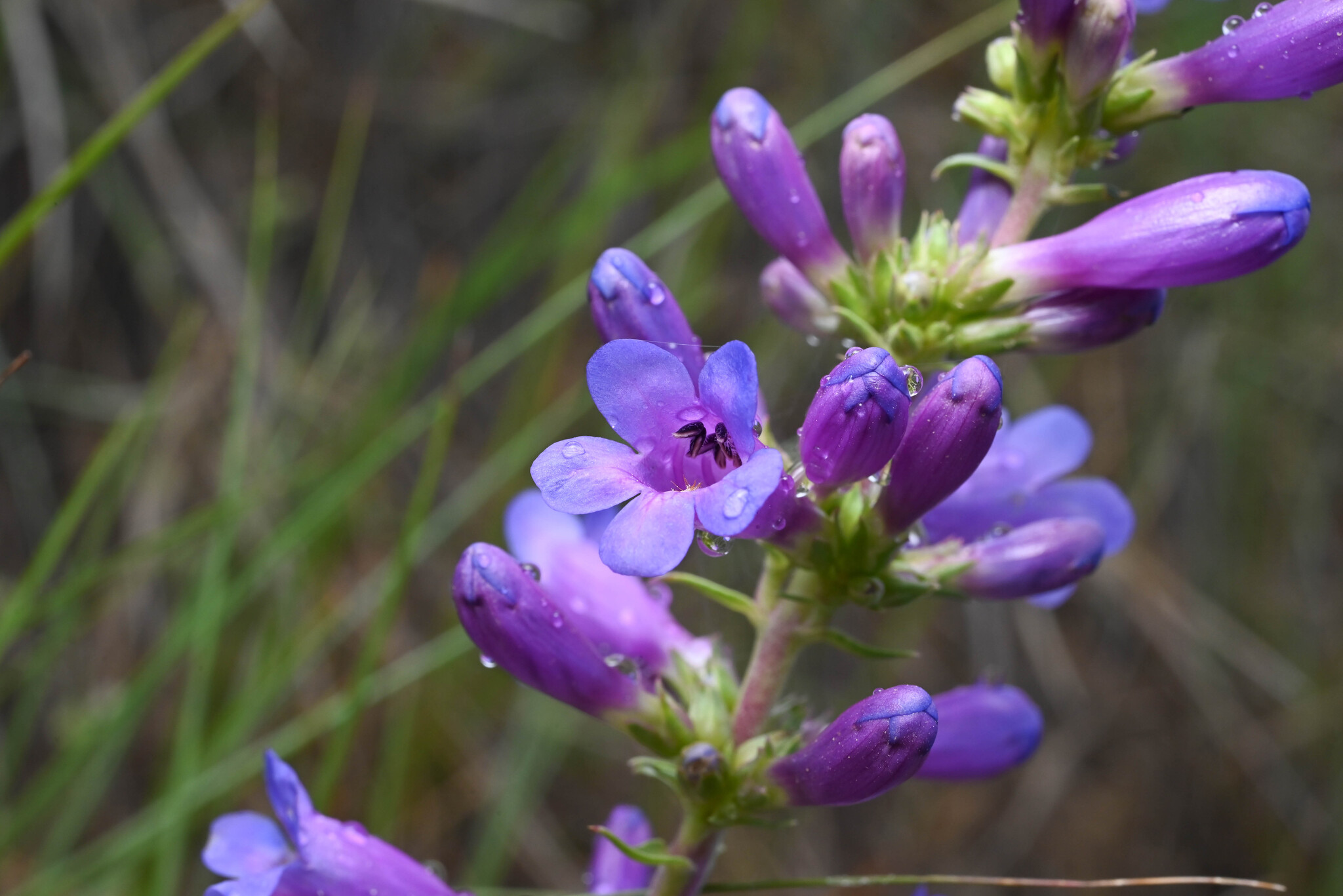
- In Moffat County, Colorado

Conservation status
- Vulnerable (NatureServe)

Scientific classification
- Kingdom: Plantae
- Clade: Tracheophytes
- Clade: Angiosperms
- Clade: Eudicots
- Clade: Asterids
- Order: Lamiales
- Family: Plantaginaceae
- Genus: Penstemon
- Species: P. fremontii

Binomial name
- Penstemon fremontii Torr. & A.Gray

Varieties
- P. f. var. fremontii; P. f. var. glabrescens

Synonyms
- Penstemon luculentus

= Penstemon fremontii =

Plant species in the veronica family

Penstemon fremontii, commonly known as Fremont penstemon, is a species of herbaceous plant that grows where the states of Wyoming, Utah, and Colorado meet in the western United States. It is a penstemon in the veronica family. Because of its limited range it is regarded as vulnerable to extinction.

== Description ==
Fremont penstemon is a herbaceous plant that grows flowering stems that usually reach 8 to 25 centimeters (3 to 10 in) in height, but occasionally may be as much 40 cm (16 in) tall. Plants can have one or more stem that grow from a woody crown that is either thick or branched. The stems are densely covered in retrorse, backwards facing, hairs making them have an ash like color.

Plants can have both cauline and basal leaves, those attached to its stems and leaves growing directly from the base of the plant, but will sometimes lack basal leaves or only have a few. The leaves can be retrorsely hairy and ashy colored like the stems or can be hairless. Basal leaves and the lowest leaves on the stems are typically 3.0–7.5 centimeters (1.2–3.0 in) in length but can be as long as 10 cm (3.9 in). They are usually 2–18 millimeters in width, sometimes reaching as much as 27 mm, and are oblanceolate to elliptic in shape with a tapering base. Stems will have two to four pairs of leaves attached directly to the stems. They measure 2.2–7.7 cm (0.9–3.0 in) in length by 3–15 mm and are usually lanceolate, shaped like the head of a spear, but occasionally might be oblanceolate, like a reversed spear head.

The flowers are in an inflorescence on the upper part of the stems and fairly packed together. It measures 3 to 28 centimeters (1.2 to 11.0 in) long and has as many as 15 or as few as 5 groups of flowers, each with two cymes with one to three flowers. The flowers are blue, blue-purple, or blue-violet and funnel shaped with a violet tube that is 6–8 mm long. Both varieties of the species can bloom in May or June, but variety glabrescens will sometimes bloom in July.

== Taxonomy ==
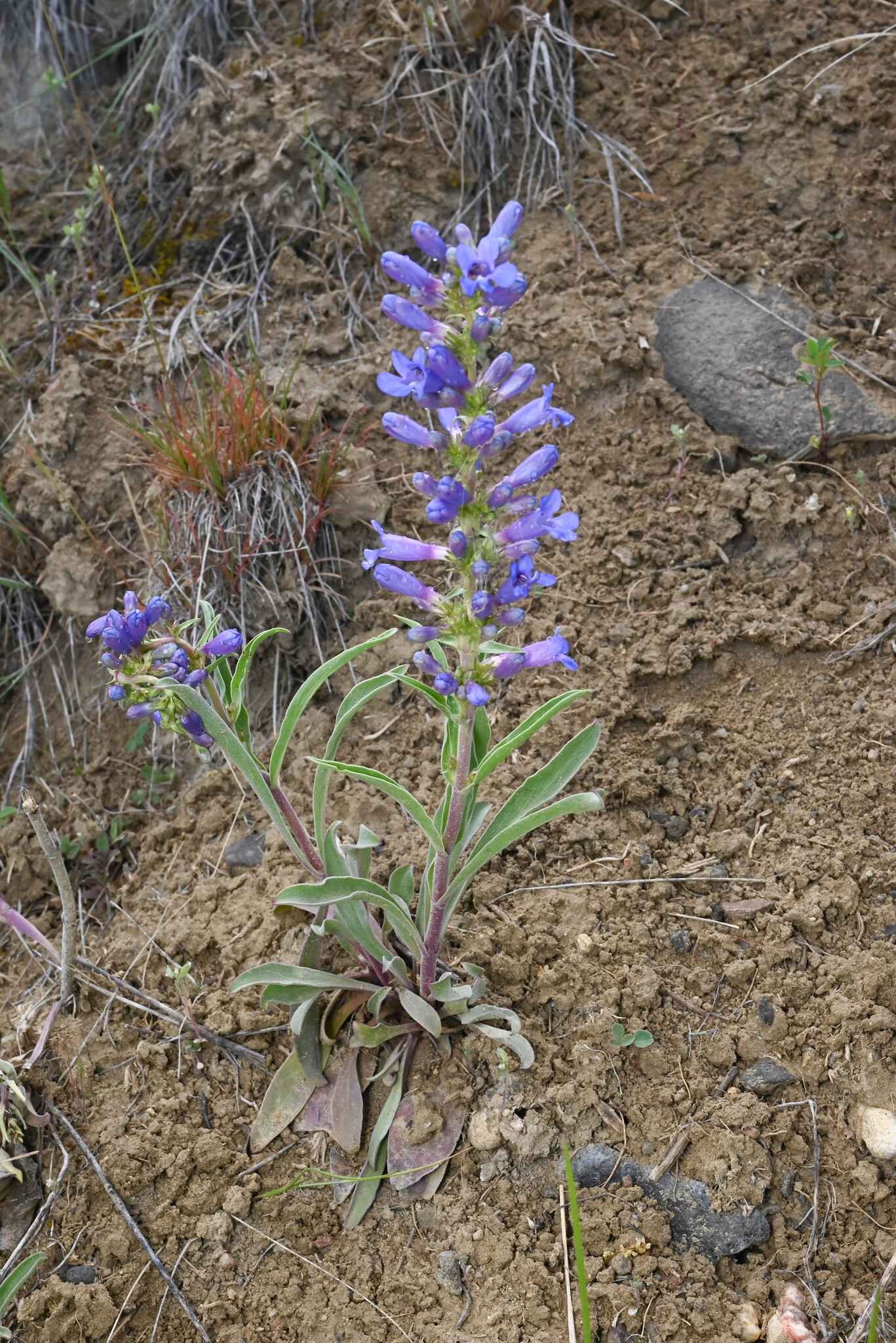
Fremont penstemon flowering in Moffat County, Colorado, north of Craig

Penstemon fremontii was scientifically described and named in 1862 by the botanists John Torrey and Asa Gray. The type specimen was collected by John Charles Frémont on 5 June 1844 "on Uinta plains". It is classified in the Penstemon genus which is part of the family Plantaginaceae. The closest relative is Penstemon cyanocaulis and together they form part of a clade with Penstemon paysoniorum and Penstemon strictiformis. It has two accepted varieties:

=== Penstemon fremontii var. fremontii ===
The autonymic variety nearly always has densely hairy leaves, occasionally only partly hairy. It grows on either somewhat clayey or sandy soils in sagebrush shrublands at elevations from 1,500–2,500 meters (4,900–8,200 ft). This variety is more widespread growing in south-central and southwestern Wyoming, northeastern Utah, and northwestern Colorado.

=== Penstemon fremontii var. glabrescens ===
Variety glabrescens was described by Robert Donald Dorn and R.W. Lichvar in 1990. It is distinguished from the rest of the species by having hairless or nearly hairless leaves, though it can be occasionally hairy on the midvein or edges of the leaves. This variety is limited to just Garfield County and Rio Blanco County in Colorado at elevations of 1,800–2,500 meters (5,900–8,200 ft). It grows barren shale slopes and in rabbitbrush shrublands.

It has 3 synonyms of the species or one of its two varieties.

Table of Synonyms
Name	Year	Rank	Synonym of:	Notes
Penstemon fremontii var. parryi A.Gray ex S.Watson	1871	variety	subsp. fremontii	= het.
Penstemon glaber var. fremontii (Torr. & A.Gray) M.E.Jones	1908	variety	P. fremontii	≡ hom.
Penstemon luculentus R.L.Johnson & M.R.Stevens	2016	species	subsp. glabrescens	≡ hom.
Notes: ≡ homotypic synonym; = heterotypic synonym

=== Names ===
The species was named fremontii in honor of John C. Frémont. It is known by the related common names Fremont penstemon, Fremont's penstemon, and Fremont's beardtongue.

== Range and habitat ==
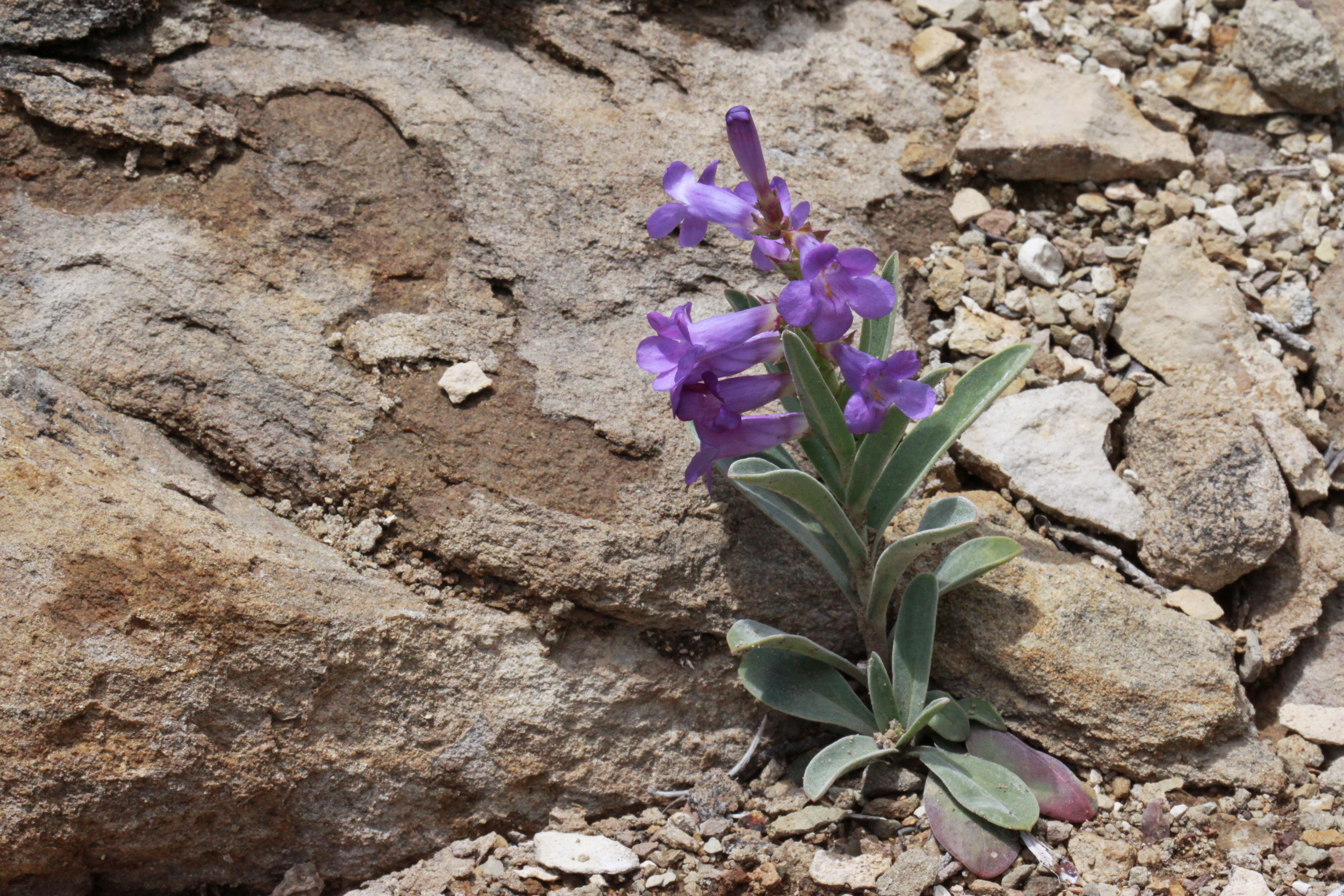
Alongside Highway 191 one mile south from Duchesne, Utah

Fremont penstemon is most widespread in Wyoming with its range stretching across southcentral Wyoming to the west including six counties; Converse, Natrona, Carbon, Fremont, Sweetwater, and Lincoln. In Colorado it is known from three counties in the northwest of the state, Moffat, Rio Blanco, and Garfield. In Utah it grow in just Duchesne and Uintah counties in the northeast. It grows on the sagebrush steppe and in piñon–juniper woodlands.

=== Conservation ===
When last evaluated in 2002 NatureServe rated the species as vulnerable (G3) at the global level. It was given this rating due to the limited range without information about abundance for Penstemon fremontii. In Colorado and Wyoming it was rated as apparently secure (S4), but was rated as imperiled (S2) in Utah. Though according to Elizabeth Neese in 1986 it was one of the most common penstemons of low-elevation shrub communities in the Uinta Basin.

== See also ==
List of Penstemon species
