= Uinta Basin =

Geologic structural basin in eastern Utah, US

Coordinates: 40°13′30″N 109°32′32″W

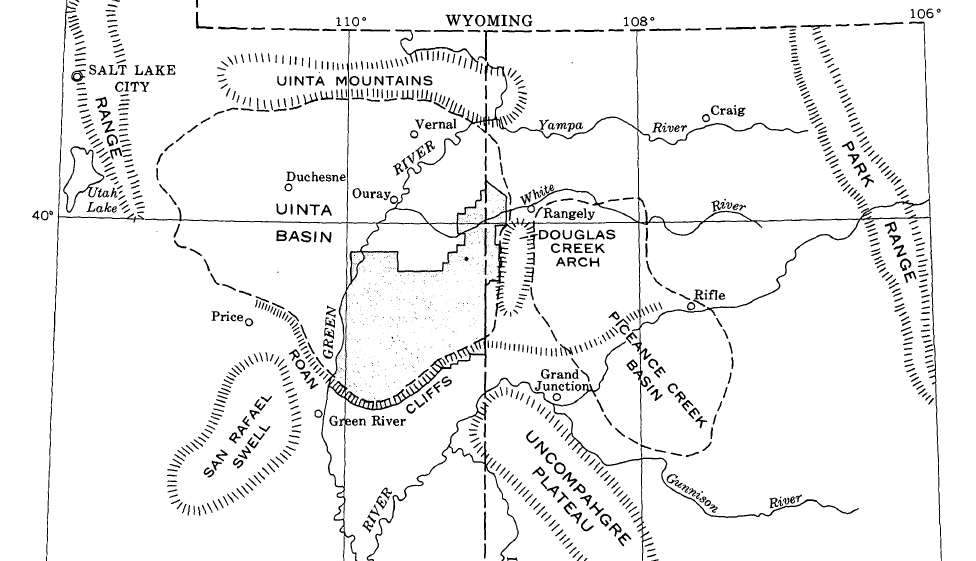
Uinta Basin structural map

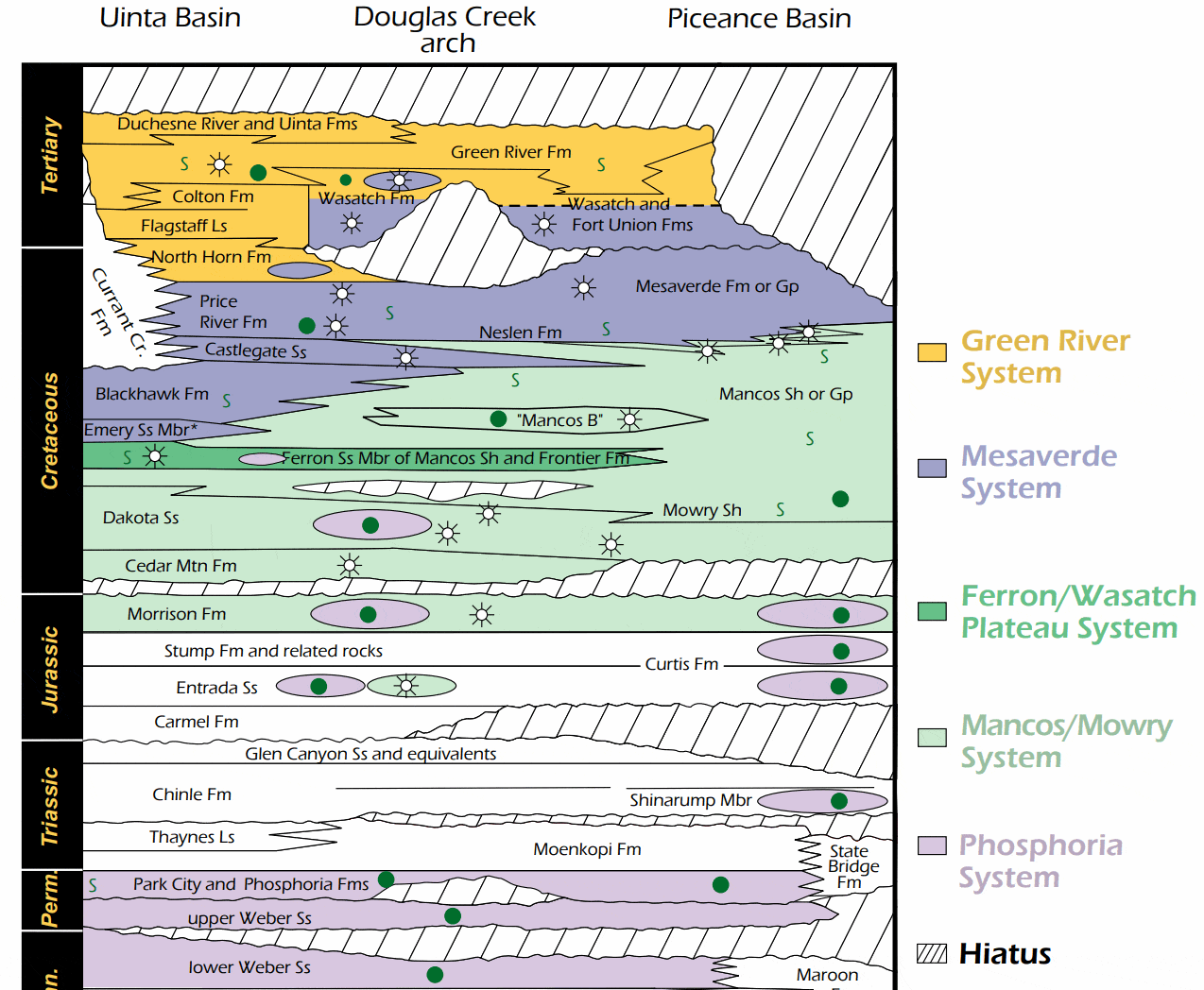
Stratigraphic column

The Uinta Basin (also known as the Uintah Basin) is a physiographic section of the larger Colorado Plateaus province, which in turn is part of the larger Intermontane Plateaus physiographic division. It is also a geologic structural basin in eastern Utah, east of the Wasatch Mountains and south of the Uinta Mountains. The Uinta Basin is fed by creeks and rivers flowing south from the Uinta Mountains. Many of the principal rivers (Strawberry River, Currant Creek, Rock Creek, Lake Fork River, and Uintah River) flow into the Duchesne River which feeds the Green River—a tributary of the Colorado River. The Uinta Mountains form the northern border of the Uinta Basin. They contain the highest point in Utah, Kings Peak, with a summit 13,528 feet (4,123 metres) above sea level. The climate of the Uinta Basin is semi-arid, with occasionally severe winter cold.

== History ==
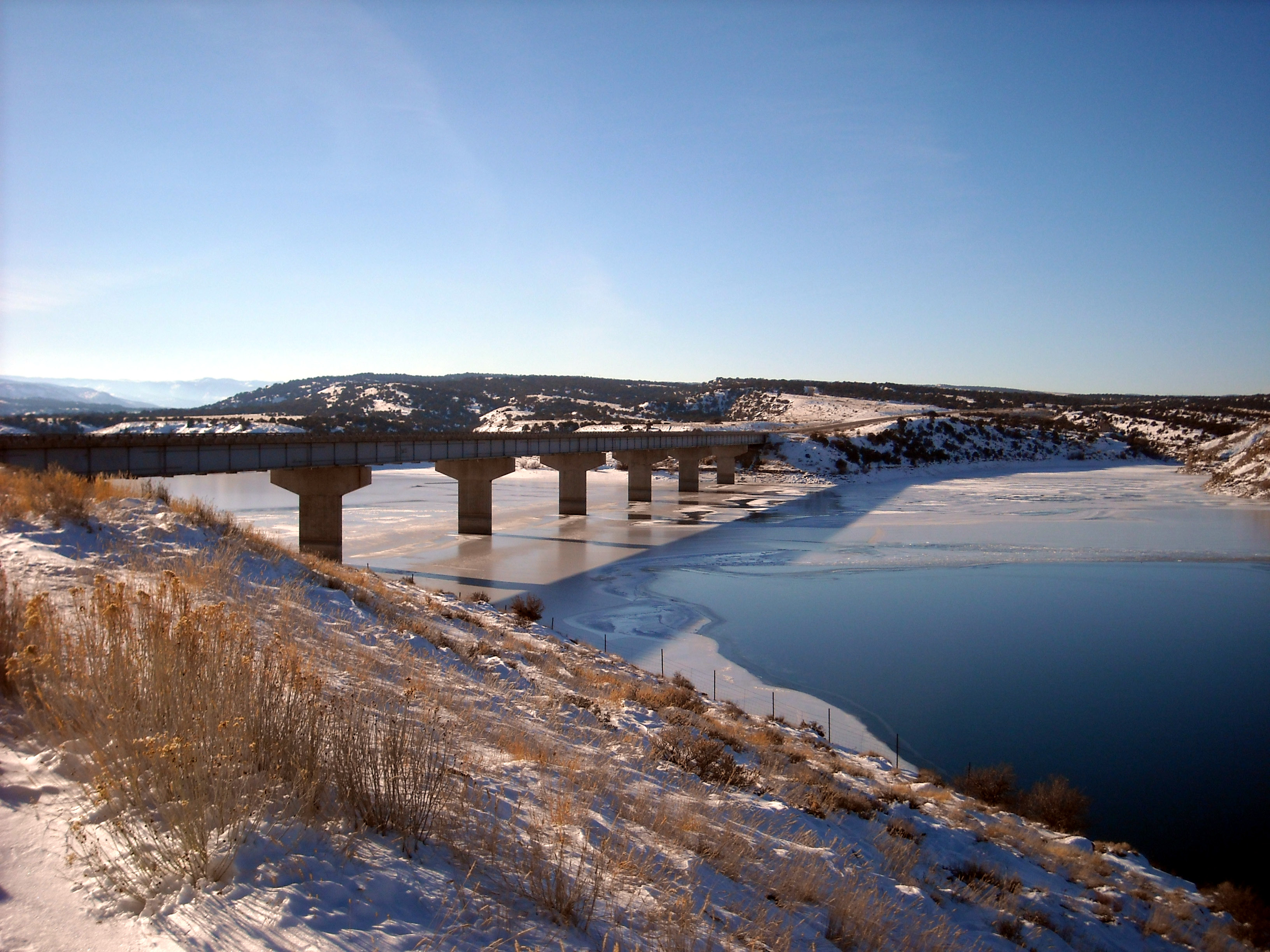
Freedom Bridge over Starvation Reservoir on U.S. Route 40 in Duchesne County, Utah.

Father Escalante's expedition visited the Uinta Basin in September 1776. 1822–1840 French Canadian trappers Étienne Provost, François le Clerc, and Antoine Robidoux entered the Uinta Basin by way of the Old Spanish Trail and made their fortunes by trapping the many beaver and trading with the Uintah tribe. The Northern Ute Indian Reservation was established in 1861 by presidential decree. The United States opened the reservation for homesteading by non-Native Americans in 1905. During the early decades of the twentieth century, both Native and non-Native irrigation systems were constructed—the Uinta Indian Irrigation Project, the Moon Lake Project, and the Central Utah Project.

== Communities ==
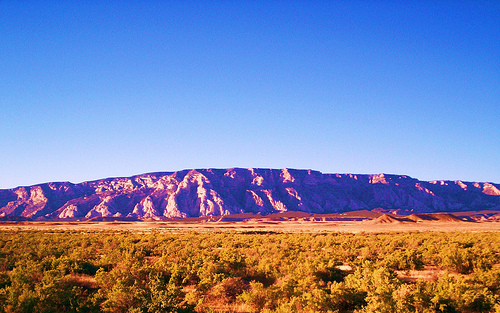
Blue Mountain, east of Jensen, Utah.

The largest community in the Utah part of the Uinta Basin is Vernal. According to the U.S. Census, the community's population in 2010 was 9,089. Other communities in the Utah part of the region include Duchesne, Roosevelt, Altamont, Tabiona, and a number of small unincorporated communities. The Uinta Basin is also the location of the Uintah and Ouray Indian Reservation, home to the Ute Tribe of the Uintah and Ouray Agency (also known as the Northern Ute Tribe). The Ute Tribe is the source of Utah's state name.

Local attractions include Dinosaur National Monument, Starvation Reservoir State Park, Flaming Gorge National Recreation Area, Raven Ridge and Fantasy Canyon.

The local economy, once based on agriculture and mining, has diversified, and energy extraction and tourism are now major industries as well. In order to move oil out of the region, a new railroad is proposed to be constructed into the basin. In addition, Utah State University operates Branch campuses at Vernal and Roosevelt, expanding educational opportunities in a previously underserved region of Utah.

== Physiography ==
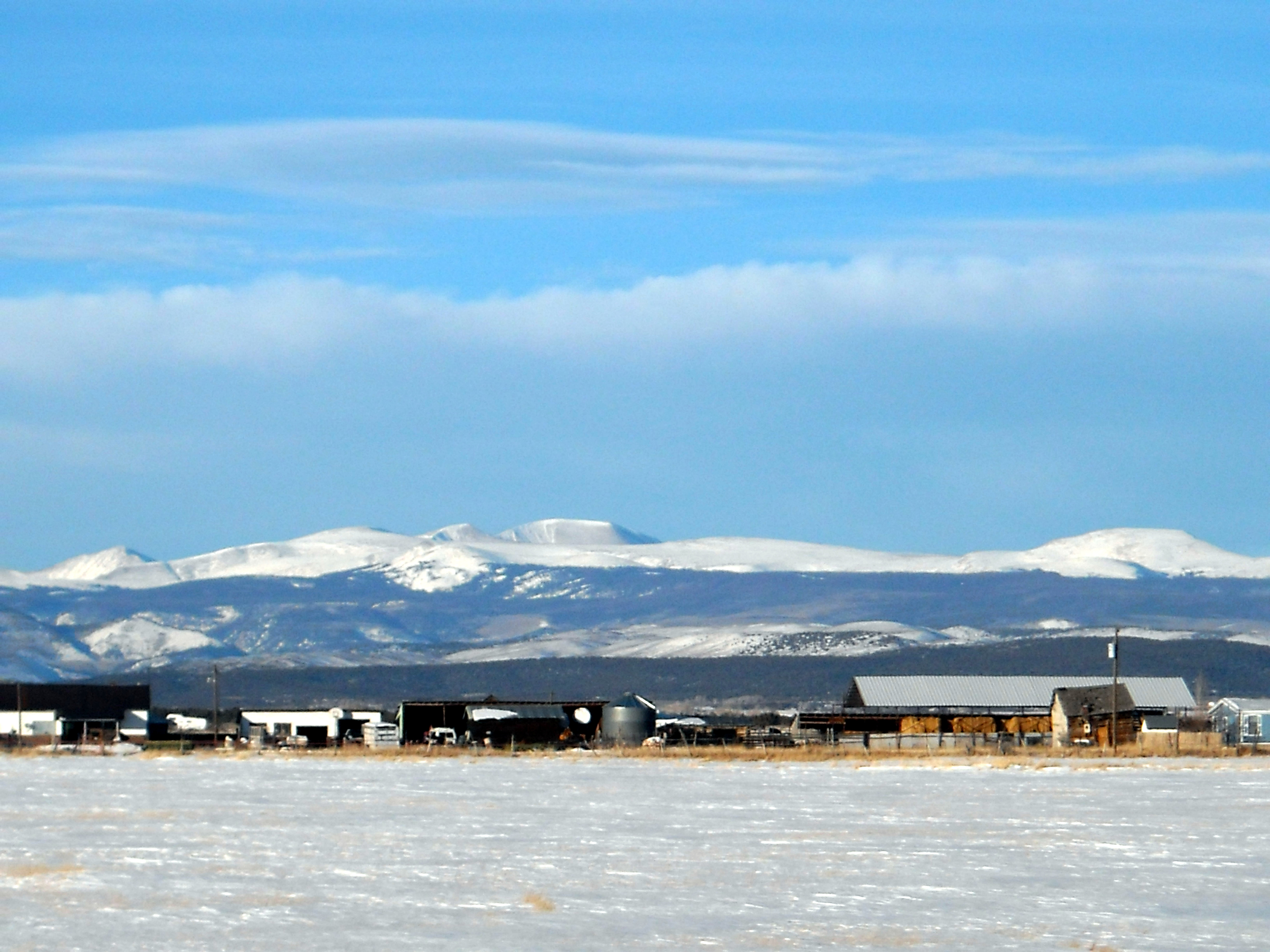
The Uinta Mountains form the northern boundary of the Uinta Basin.

The Uinta Basin is the most northerly section of the Colorado Plateau sections. The basin is 5,000 to 10,000 feet (1,500 to 3,000 m) above sea level and corresponding to this depression is a broad east–west strip of higher plateau that rises sharply above the denuded country to the south. On the south side of the plateau the descent of 3,000 feet (910 m), to the general level of eastern Utah on the south, is made in two steps. The first is the Roan Cliffs and the second, the Book Cliffs. Eastward in Colorado the two lines of cliffs are poorly distinguished. The Green River flows southward out of the Uinta Mountains to the north, crossing the Uinta Basin, and flows in a 5,000 feet (1,500 m) deep gorge known as Desolation Canyon. The Colorado River crosses the eastern portion of this section, cutting off an area of some 40 miles (64 kilometres) in diameter in which are preserved fragments of a lofty lava cap forming Grand Mesa and Battlement Mesa.

== Geology ==
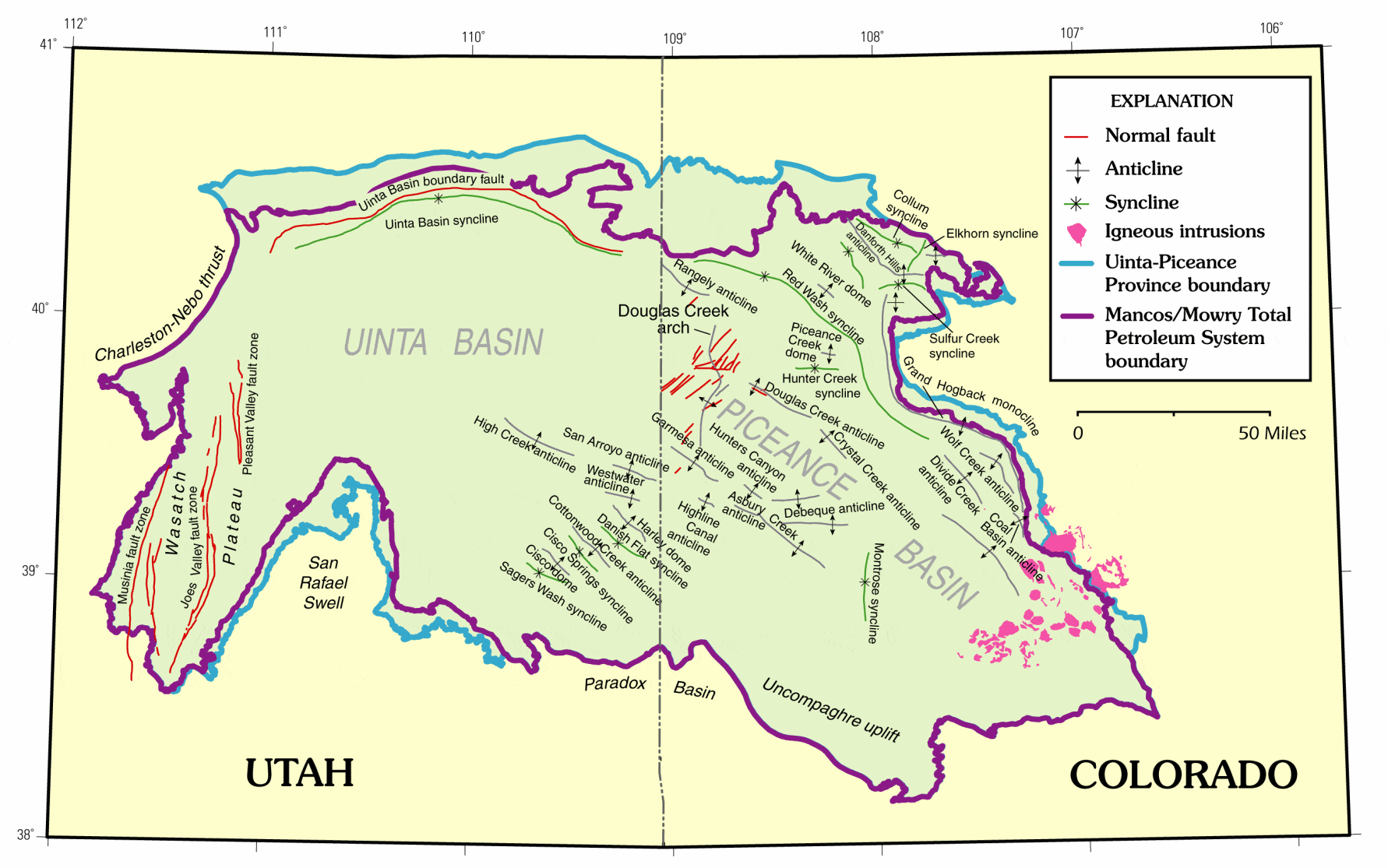
Uinta-Piceance Basins geological map

The Uinta Basin forms a geologic structural basin, and is the source of commercial oil and gas production. Separated from the Piceance Basin by the Douglas Creek Arch, both basins formed during the Laramide Orogeny, and are bounded by the Charleston-Nebo thrust fault, the Uinta Basin boundary fault, and the Grand Hogback monocline. The Uinta Basin includes the Wasatch Plateau. According to the USGS Uinta-Piceance Assessment Team, "The black-shale facies of the Green River Formation is the main petroleum system of Tertiary age whereas the Mahogany zone of the Green River Formation is a minor component. The Cretaceous Mancos Group and equivalent rocks are the main source of Cretaceous oil and a major contributor of gas in the basin, whereas the Upper Cretaceous Mesaverde is a lesser contributor of oil but a significant source for gas. Ferron Sandstone coals are known to be a source of coalbed methane. The most prominent source of oil from Paleozoic rocks is the Permian Phosphoria Formation.

During the Laramide Orogeny along the Wasatch Mountains, the north–south trending coast during the Late Cretaceous was receding eastward, at the same time the area where the basin is located was subsiding, creating a lacustrine environment. A clastic wedge consisting of the North Horn, Colton, and Wasatch was deposited northwards. These sediments interfingered with organic-rich lacustrine clays and carbonate muds of the Green River and Flagstaff facies. Later, deposits originated from the Uinta Mountains from the north, forming a southward-thinning clastic wedge. A carbonate sediment consisting of an organic-rich oil shale was deposited from the middle Eocene into the Oligocene. The basin is also known for solid-hydrocarbon-filled fractures consisting of ozocerite, gilsonite, and wurtzilite.

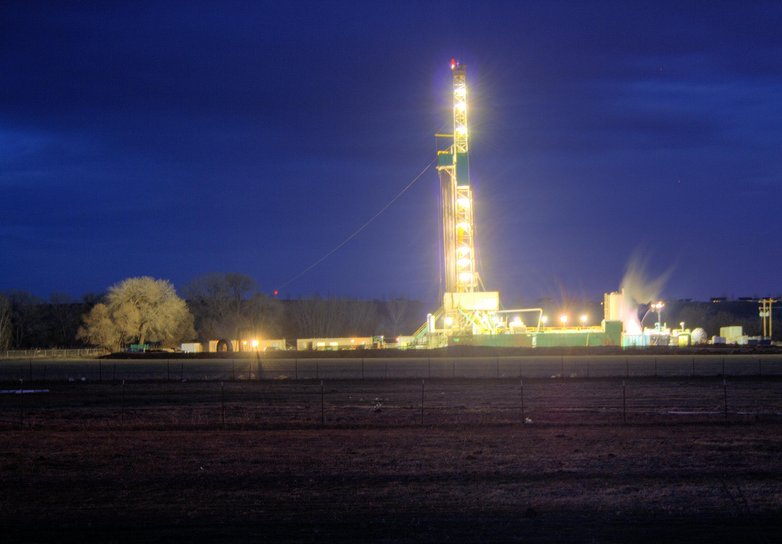
Drilling at night in Uinta Basin

In 1948, oil was discovered in the Paleozoic portion of the basin at Ashley Valley. Tertiary discoveries followed in 1948 at Roosevelt, and then the Red Wash Field and Duchesne Field in 1951. The Bluebell Field was discovered in 1967 and the Altamont Field in 1970. The Altamont-Bluebell structural trap occurs where the Wasatch sandstone pinches out.

== Endemic Flora ==
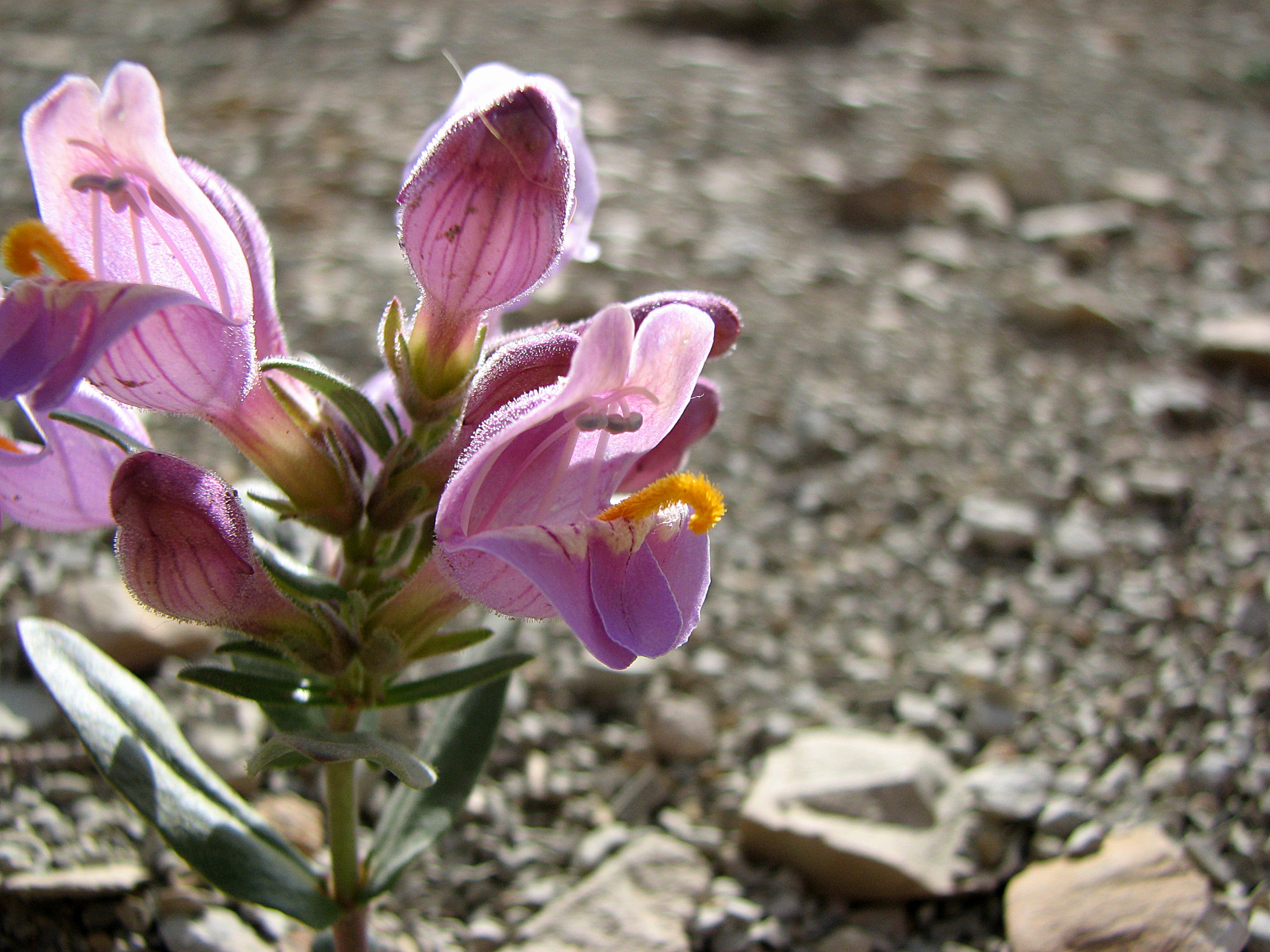
Penstemon grahamii, Graham's Penstemon, an endemic species to the Uinta Basin.

The Uinta Basin has a variety of endemic plants, including:

- Aquilegia barnebyi, Oil Shale Columbine
- Aquilegia micrantha var. grahamii, Graham's Columbine
- Astragalus hamiltonii, Hamilton's Milkvetch
- Astragalus lutosus, Dragon Milkvetch
- Astragalus saurinus, Dinosaur Milkvetch
- Cirsium barnebyi, Barneby's Thistle
- Cryptantha barnebyi, Oilshale Cryptantha
- Cymopterus duchesnensis, Uinta Basin Springparsley
- Ericameria × uintahensis, Uinta Rabbitbrush
- Eriogonum brevicaule var. viridulum, Clay Hill Buckwheat
- Lepidium huber
- Mentzelia goodrichii, Goodrich's Blazingstar
- Penstemon fremontii, Fremont Penstemon
- Penstemon goodrichii, Lapoint Penstemon
- Penstemon grahamii, Graham's Penstemon
- Schoenocrambe suffrutescens, Shrubby Mustardreed

== See also ==
- Billie Untermann
