= Ericameria × uintahensis =

Uinta rabbitbrush
- In the southeastern Uinta Basin in Utah

Scientific classification
- Kingdom: Plantae
- Clade: Tracheophytes
- Clade: Angiosperms
- Clade: Eudicots
- Clade: Asterids
- Order: Asterales
- Family: Asteraceae
- Genus: Ericameria
- Species: E. × uintahensis

Binomial name
- Ericameria × uintahensis (L. C. Anderson) G. L. Nesom & G. I. Baird

Synonyms
- Chrysothamnus nauseosus subsp. uintahensis L.C.Anderson; Chrysothamnus nauseosus var. uintahensis (L.C.Anderson) S.L.Welsh

Hybrid species of flowering plant

Ericameria × uintahensis, commonly known as the Uinta rabbitbrush, is a rare, stable hybrid of rabbitbrush found only in the Uinta Basin in Utah. It is a hybrid of Ericameria nauseosa × Ericameria parryi. It blooms from August through October in badlands and along road cuts below 1,800 m (6,000 ft) of elevation. The plant is superficially similar to Tetradymia canescens, with whitish leaves and clustered flowers at the end of the branches.

Flowers and leaves
