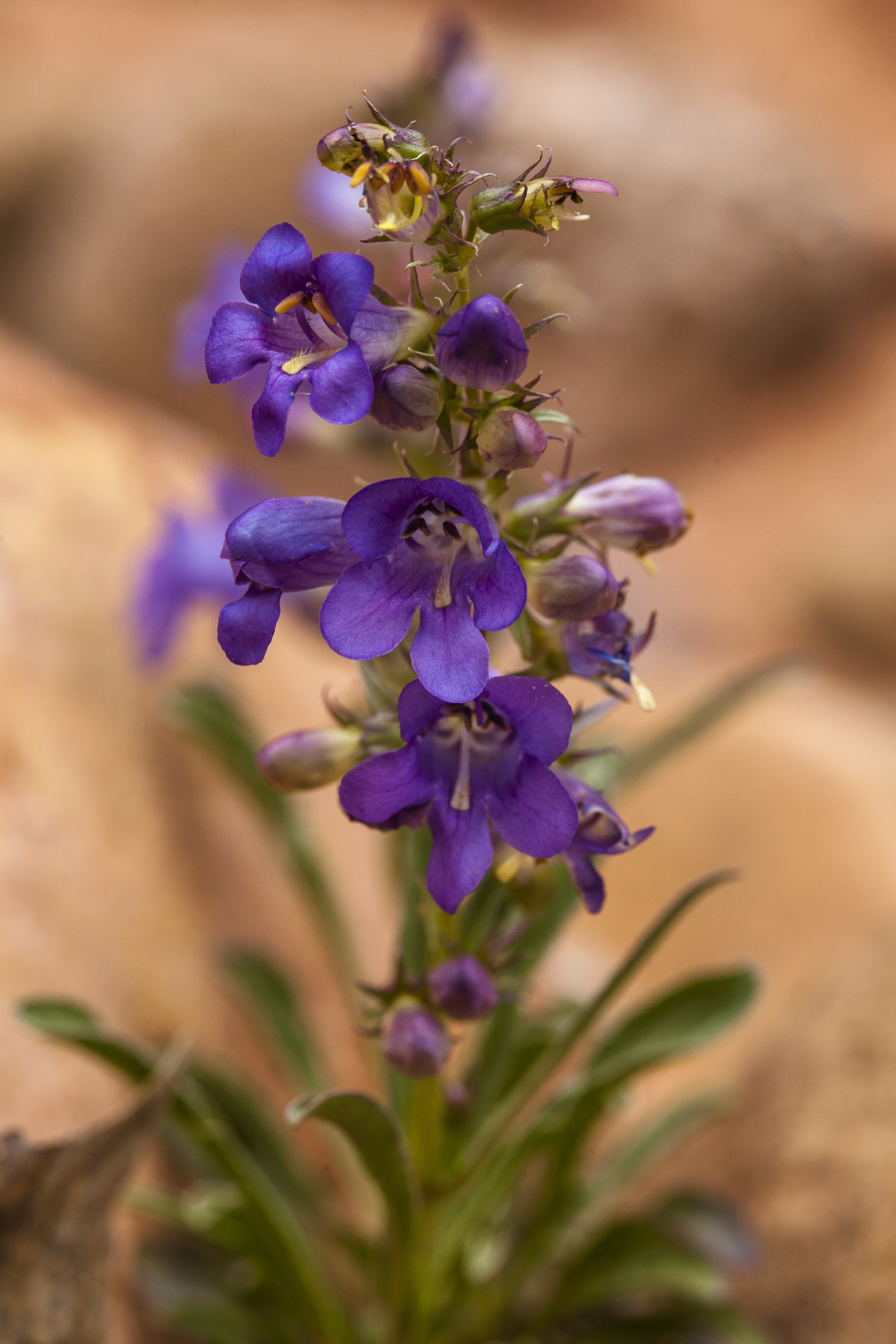

Conservation status
- Secure (NatureServe)

Scientific classification
- Kingdom: Plantae
- Clade: Tracheophytes
- Clade: Angiosperms
- Clade: Eudicots
- Clade: Asterids
- Order: Lamiales
- Family: Plantaginaceae
- Genus: Penstemon
- Species: P. cyanocaulis

Binomial name
- Penstemon cyanocaulis Payson

= Penstemon cyanocaulis =

Plant species in the plantain family

Penstemon cyanocaulis, the bluestem penstemon or bluestem beardtongue, is a perennial plant in the plantain family (Plantaginaceae) found in the Colorado Plateau and Canyonlands region of the southwestern United States.

== Description ==
Penstemon cyanocaulis is a herbaceous plant with stems that typically grow 20 to 60 centimeters (8 to 24 in) tall, but on occasion may be just 16 cm (6 in) at full growth. The stems either grow straight upward or out a short distance before growing upwards. The surface of the stems is mostly smooth and hairless, but they may be somewhat puberulent, covered in very short and fine hairs, towards their base. They are also more or less glaucous, covered in natural waxes making it appear blue-green. Each plant may have many stems or only one that grow from a woody caudex with short branches. Underground it has a thick taproot.

=== Leaves ===
The plants have both cauline and basal leaves, ones attached to the stems and those that grow directly from the base of the plant. The edges of its leaves are smooth, but often crisped, having curly edges. The leaves may be leathery or not and also may be either smooth or have fine hairs at the base or just along the midvein. The basal and the lower cauline leaves are usually 5 to 9.5 centimeters in length, but occasionally just three cm. Their width is 1 to 2.8 cm, but usually narrower than 1.5 cm. Their shape ranges from spatulate to oblanceolate, spoon shaped to like a reversed spear point with the widest part past the middle, with a tapered base and a rounded to blunt tip. The stems will have two to four pairs of leaves. The upper leaves are attached directly to the stem where the lower leaves have a narrow petiolar, stalk like, base. The upper leaves also often clasp the stem, somewhat. They are lanceolate to elliptic, spear point shaped to having curved ellipse sides, and 2 to 7.3 cm long. They also can be significantly narrower at 0.4 to 1.5 cm in width.

=== Flower and fruit ===
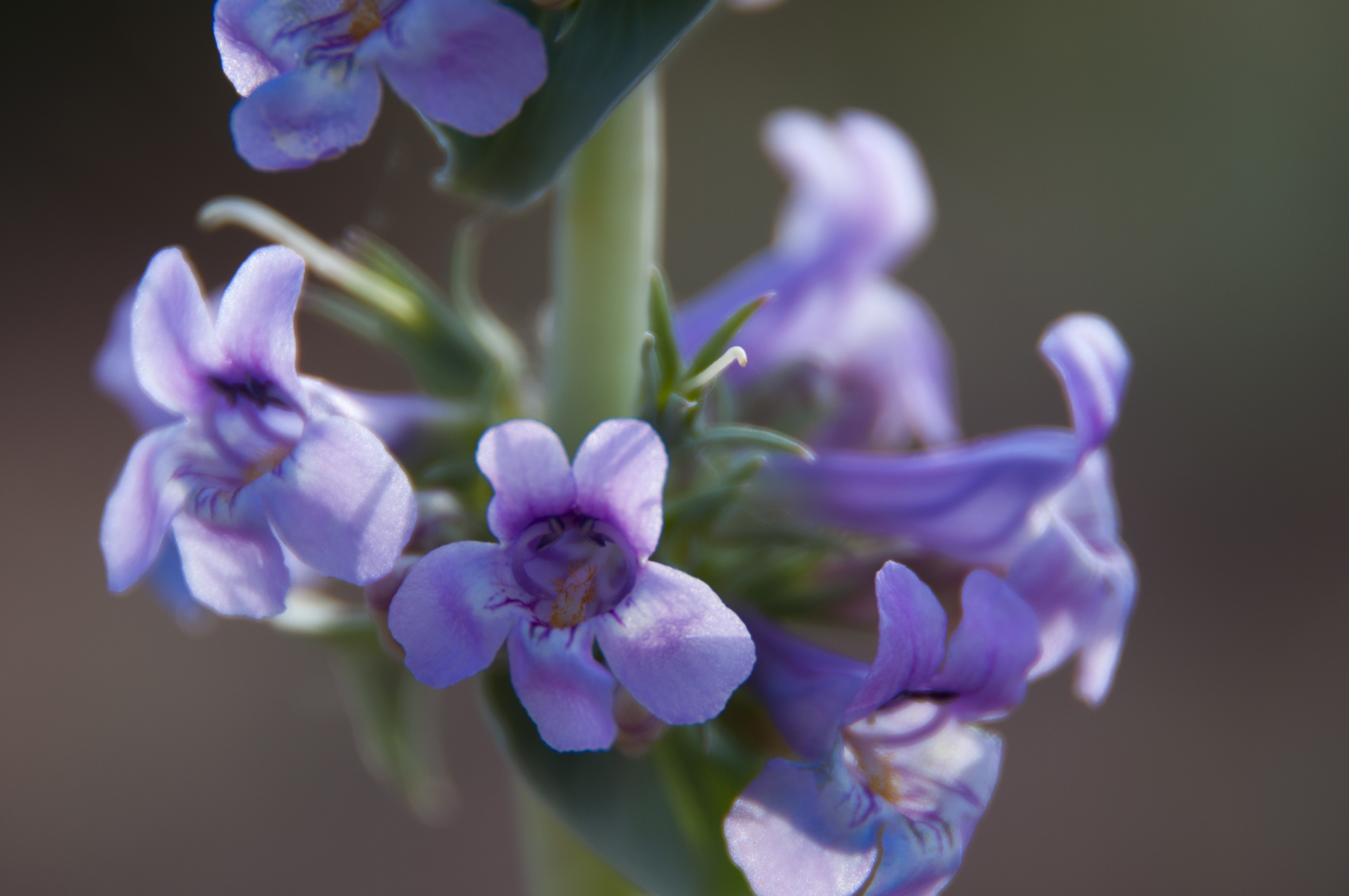
Flowers photographed in, Canyonlands National Park

The inflorescence is the top 4 to 31 centimeters (1.5 to 12 in) of each stem. They will have five to twelve groups of flowers each with a pair of bracts underneath it. Each group will have a pair of cymes with one to five flowers. The flowers all face in one direction or nearly in one direction away from the inflorescence. The flowers are tubular and two lipped, the upper divided into two lobes and the lower with three. Their color may be blue or violet with darker violet nectar guide lines and measure 1.4 to 2 centimeters long. The staminode reaches the flower's opening and is covered in yellow-golden hairs towards its end. Blooming may start as early as April or continue as late as July.

Fruits are woody capsules that measure six to ten millimeters long.

Penstemon cyanocaulis is very similar to Penstemon strictiformis, which grows to the south. The bluestem penstemon can be distinguished by its broader leaves with leaf edges that are more wavy.

== Taxonomy ==
Penstemon cyanocaulis was scientifically described and named by the botanist Edwin Blake Payson in 1915. It has no synonyms or varieties.

=== Names ===
The species name, cyanocaulis, is a compound of cyan and caul meaning blue stem, referring to the stem color. Similarly in English it is known as bluestem penstemon or bluestem beardtongue.

== Habitat and range ==
The range of the species extends from west central Colorado across the border into five counties in eastern Utah. In Utah they are found in the Canyon Lands, on slopes in the La Sal Mountains, and mesas nearby or in Dead Horse Point State Park. In addition they grow at the edge of the desert on the north of Wasatch Plateau and the western side of Tavaputs Plateau. In Colorado it is only found in the western parts of Mesa and Montrose counties and some parts of San Miguel County. The elevation range of the species starts at 1,300 meters (4,300 ft) and reaches 2,700 meters (8,900 ft).

Plants grow in sandy soils and on rocky slopes. It can be found in blackbrush scrub, pinyon juniper woodland, and mountain bush communities.

=== Conservation ===
The conservation organization NatureServe evaluated Penstemon cyanocaulis in 1984 and rated it as secure (G5). They also evaluated it at the state level in Colorado and rated it vulnerable (S3).

== Ecology ==
It is pollinated by bees and other insects.

== See also ==
List of Penstemon species
