= Raven Ridge =

Sedimentary rock exposure in Colorado and Utah, U.S.

Coordinates: 40°11′22″N 109°03′53″W

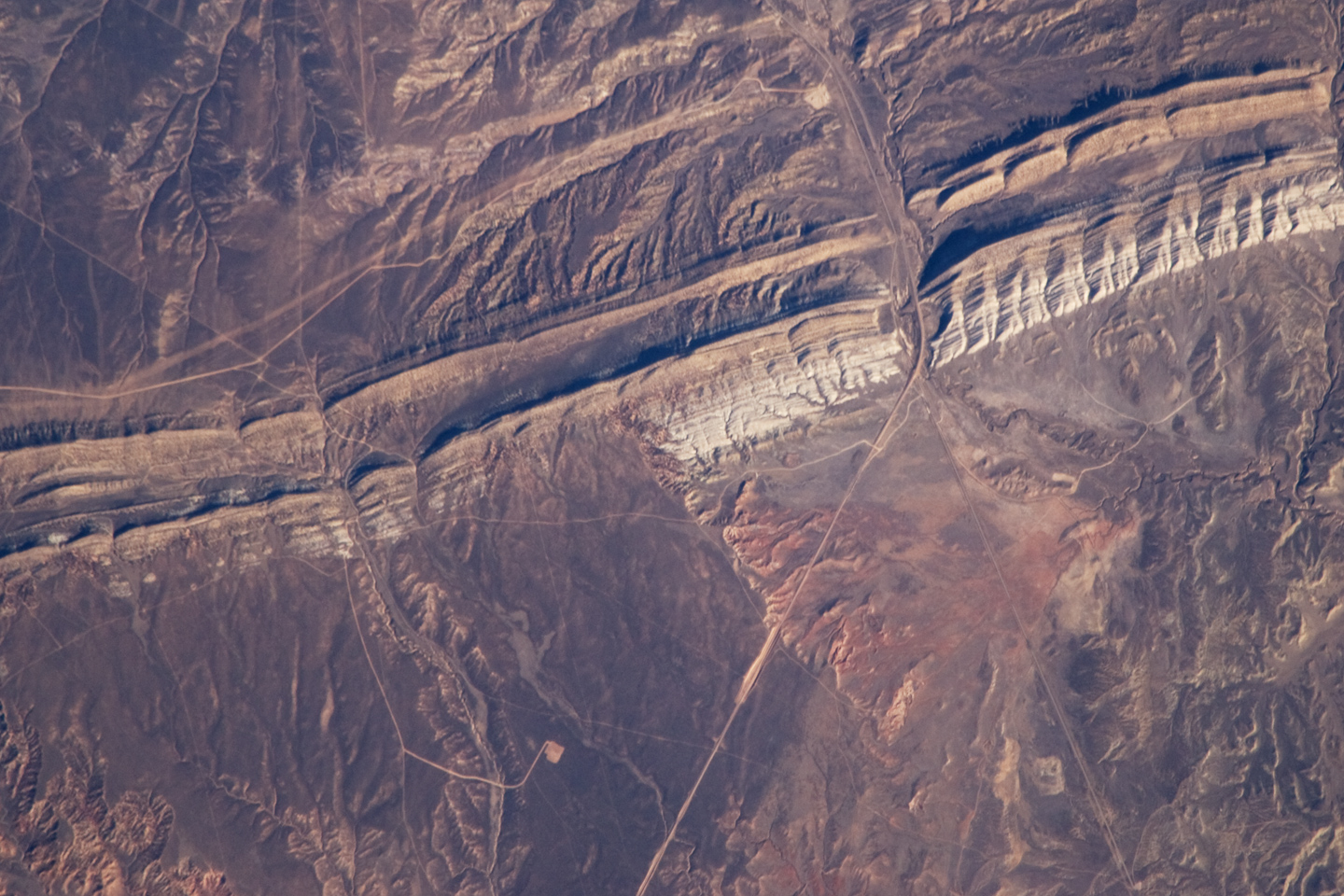
Raven Ridge. NASA satellite photo, 2008.

Raven Ridge is a starkly visible sedimentary rock exposure located in Rio Blanco County, Colorado and Uintah County, Utah, USA. It is managed by the Bureau of Land Management. The ridge contains a diverse selection of rare plants unique to the state of Colorado.

== Geology ==
The Raven Ridge and the adjacent parallel Squaw Ridge are northwest striking rock exposures which provide an opportunity to understand this part of Earth's history. This section through a sequence of rock layers that were deposited between ~53-49 million years ago, has become exposed because of its later tectonic history. The outcrops span the geological time interval that includes the early and middle portions of the Eocene Epoch. During this time, ancestral horses, primates, and rodents, among many other mammal groups, were common at Raven Ridge. At the southern edge of Raven Ridge are found the only available surface coal beds in the area.

The rocks of Raven Ridge were originally deposited on or near a shore line as horizontal sedimentary layers within the Uinta Basin. Uplift and folding associated with the later stages of the Laramide Orogeny subsequently tilted them into a nearly vertical position.

== Plants ==
Raven Ridge is the habitat for eight endemic rare plant species: Penstemon grahamii (Graham's beardtongue), Penstemon albifluvis (White River beardtongue), Astragalus lutosus (Dragon milkvetch), Aquilegia barnebyi (Mancos columbine), Cryptantha rollinsii (Rollins's catseye), Parthenium ligulata (Colorado feverfew), Eriogonum ephedroides (ephedra buckwheat), and Phacelia incana (hoary phacelia). Numerous other plants are found there as well.

== Fossils ==
Found at the summit of the ridge are a multitude of perfectly preserved fossil gastropods.
