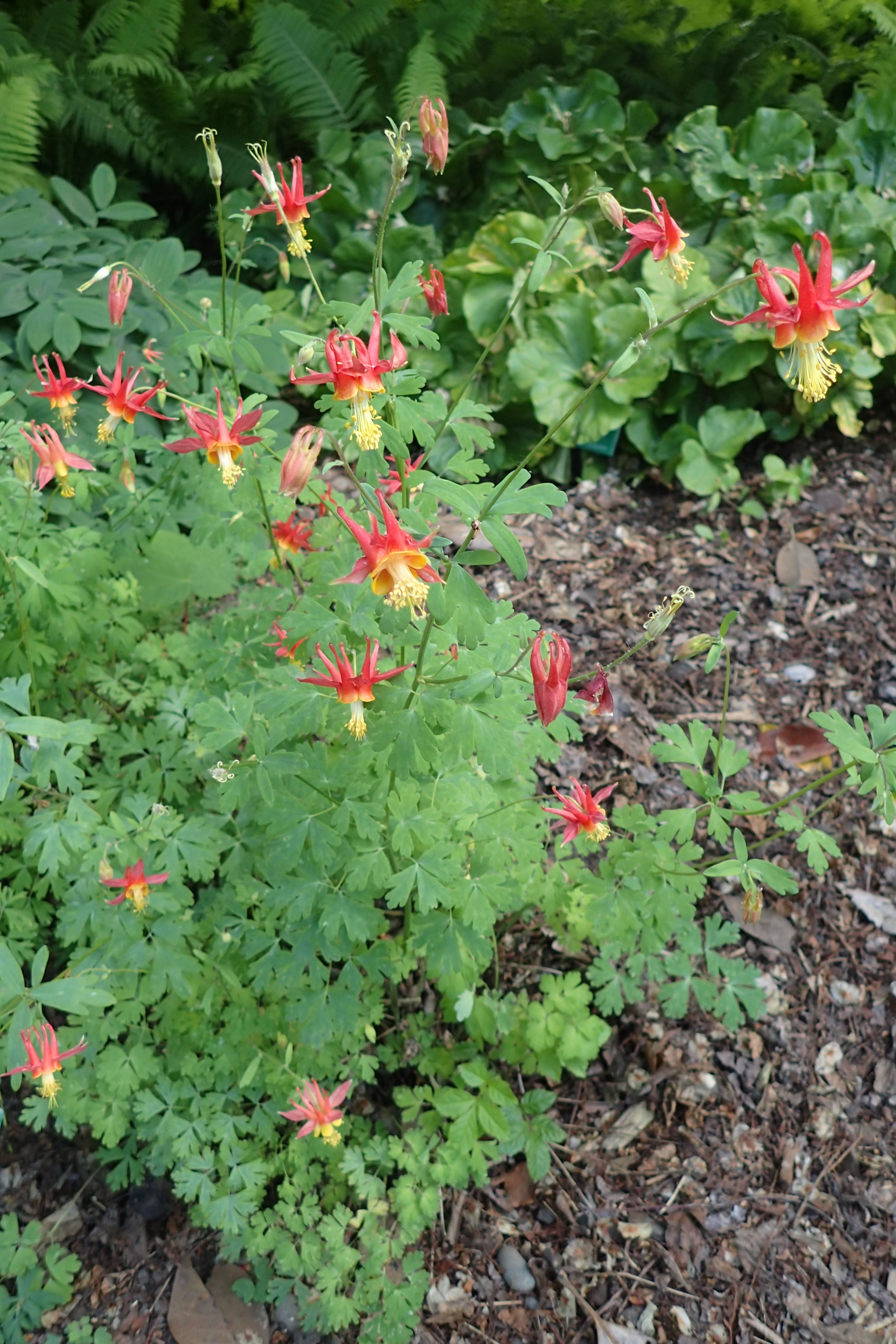

Conservation status
- Apparently Secure (NatureServe)

Scientific classification
- Kingdom: Plantae
- Clade: Tracheophytes
- Clade: Angiosperms
- Clade: Eudicots
- Order: Ranunculales
- Family: Ranunculaceae
- Genus: Aquilegia
- Species: A. barnebyi

Binomial name
- Aquilegia barnebyi Munz

= Aquilegia barnebyi =

Species of flowering plant

Aquilegia barnebyi, commonly known as the oil shale columbine or Barneby's columbine, is a perennial species of flowering plant in the buttercup family, with a native range comprising northeastern Utah and northwestern Colorado in the United States. It is named after Rupert Charles Barneby, who, with Harry Dwight Dillon Ripley, first discovered it in Colorado.

== Description ==
Plants grow 30–80 cm (12–31 in) tall, with a spread of up to 30 in (76 cm). Leaves are compound, as with other species of Aquilegia, and are 5–30 cm (2.0–11.8 in) in diameter. Its nodding flowers have pink sepals, while the petals are yellow with reddish-pink spurs.

== Habitat and distribution ==
Aquilegia barnebyi is endemic to the Uinta Basin (Duchesne and Uintah counties) in Utah, and to Garfield, Gunnison, Montrose, Pitkin, and Rio Blanco counties in Colorado. It grows on moist, exposed oil shale in cliffs and rocky slopes, and in pinyon-juniper woodlands. In the 1980s it was thought to be rare in Utah, and was considered for protection under the Endangered Species Act; as of 2021, it thought to be sufficiently widespread and abundant as not to be at risk of extinction.

== Phylogeny ==
Analysis of chloroplast DNA showed A. barnebyi is closely related to A. coerulea, a species of Aquilegia native to southern Wyoming, Colorado, and northern New Mexico.

== Cultivation ==
Aquilegia barnebyi grows in full sun to part shade, and is suitable for rock gardens. It is drought tolerant, but is not tolerant of salty conditions. Aquilegia 'Firelight' is a cultivar that has been selected for shorter stems and ombre yellow–pink flowers.
