= Billie Untermann =

American geologist (1906-1973)

- Born: 1906
- Died: 1973 (aged 66–67)
- Education: University of California, Berkeley
- Known for: Understanding and recognition of the Uintah Basin
- Spouse: Ernest Untermann
- Scientific career
- Fields: Geology

Billie Untermann (1906–1973) was a geologist who had a significant contribution to the understanding and recognition of the Uintah Basin. She was the single author of the text "The Uinta Basin—Past and Present." This text highlighted the history of the Uinta Basin, which is a stretch of land in Utah which was first colonized 15,000-20,000 years ago. She received her B.A. in geology in 1929 and later an M.A. at the University of California, Berkeley in 1934. She discovered and assembled many dinosaur skeletons, which were a popular attraction at the Utah Field House of Natural History, to which she was a museum technician. She eventually become its director.

Along with her husband Ernest Untermann they published a popular text "Geology of Dinosaur National Monument". Her works were instrumental in fostering tourism in Vernal.
