= Fantasy Canyon =

Canyon in Uintah County, Utah, United States

Coordinates: 40°03′25.5″N 109°23′33.8″W

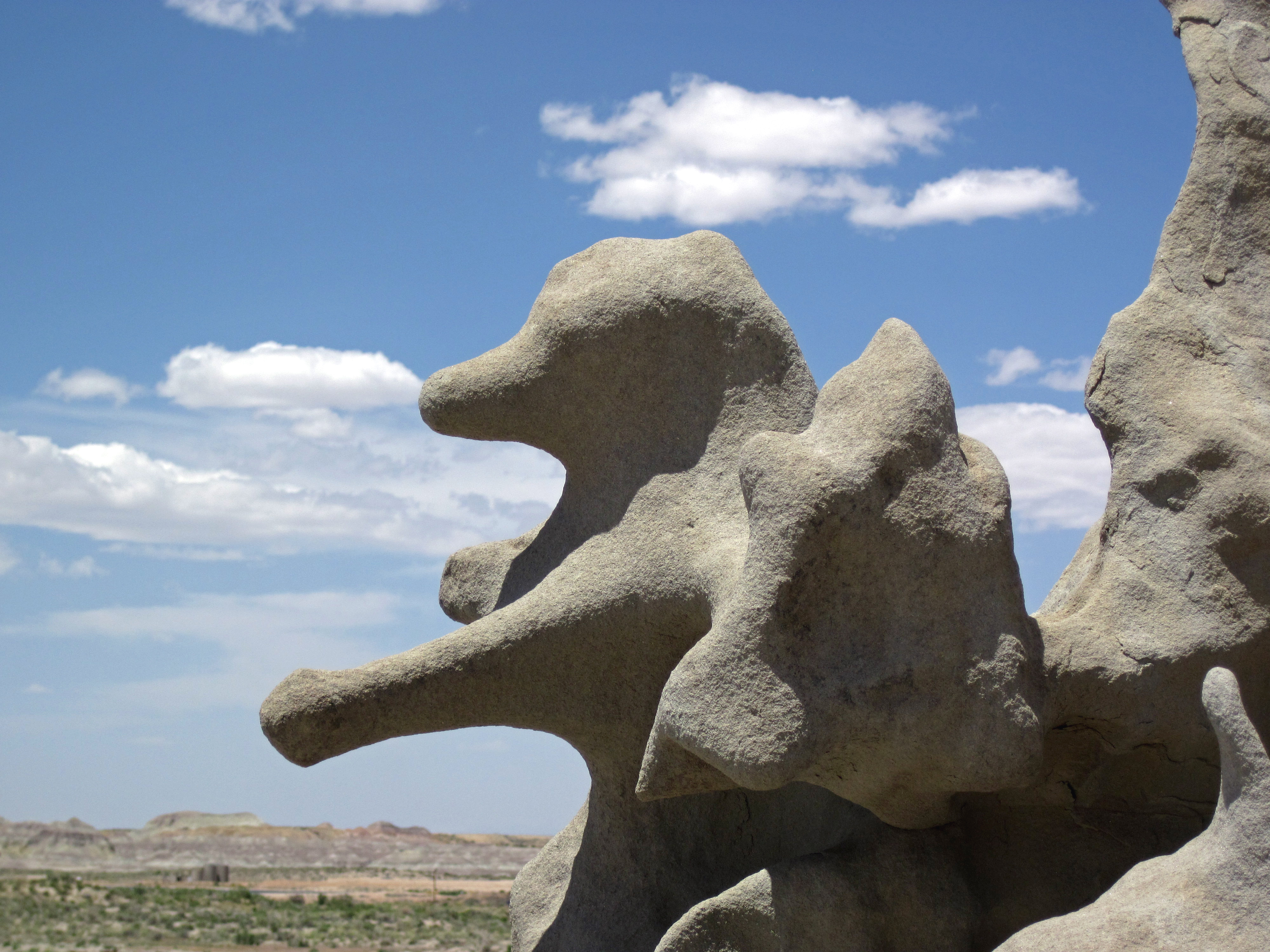
Bear? A closeup in Fantasy Canyon, Utah, June 2012

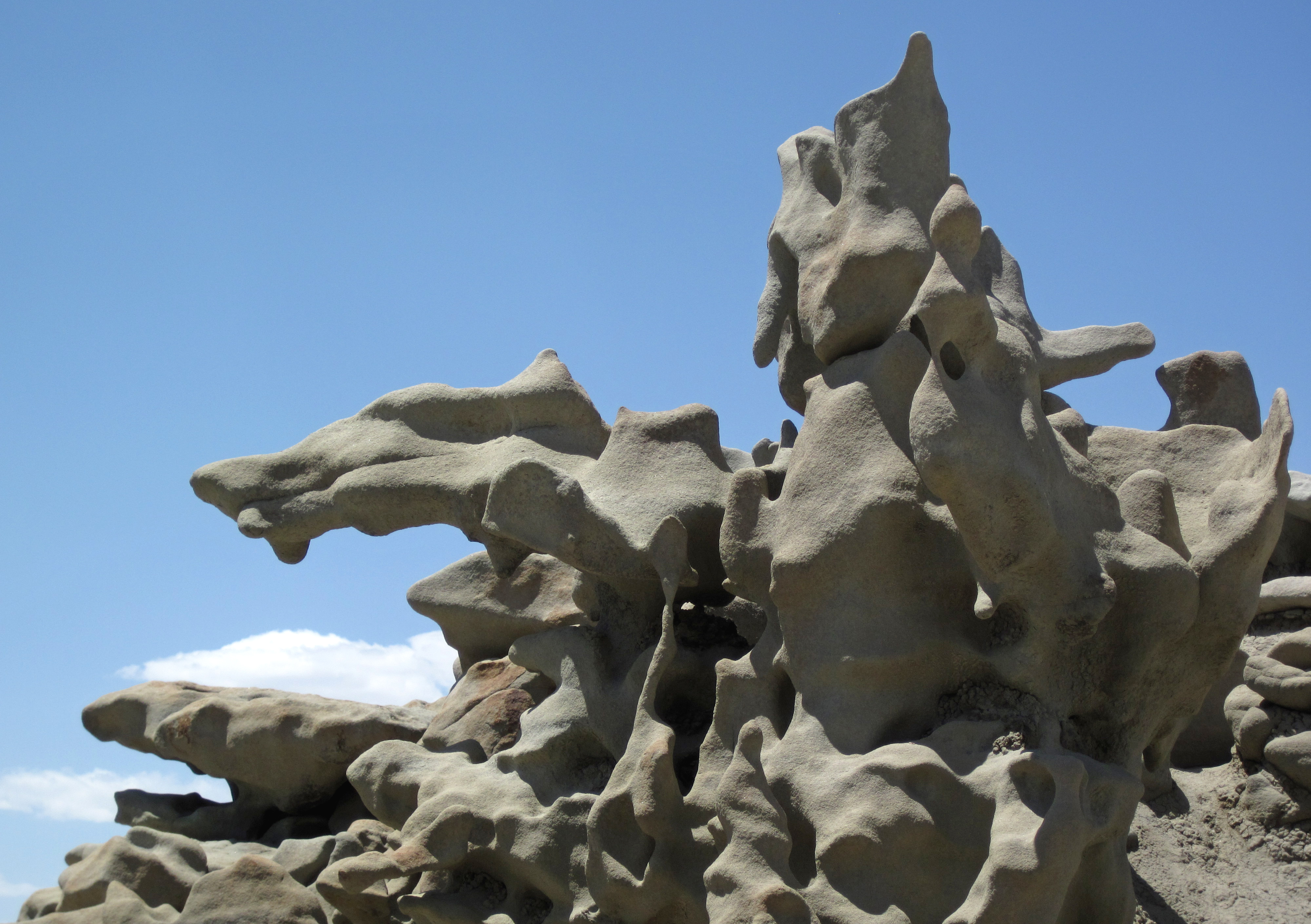
Chaotic rockforms in Fantasy Canyon, June 2012

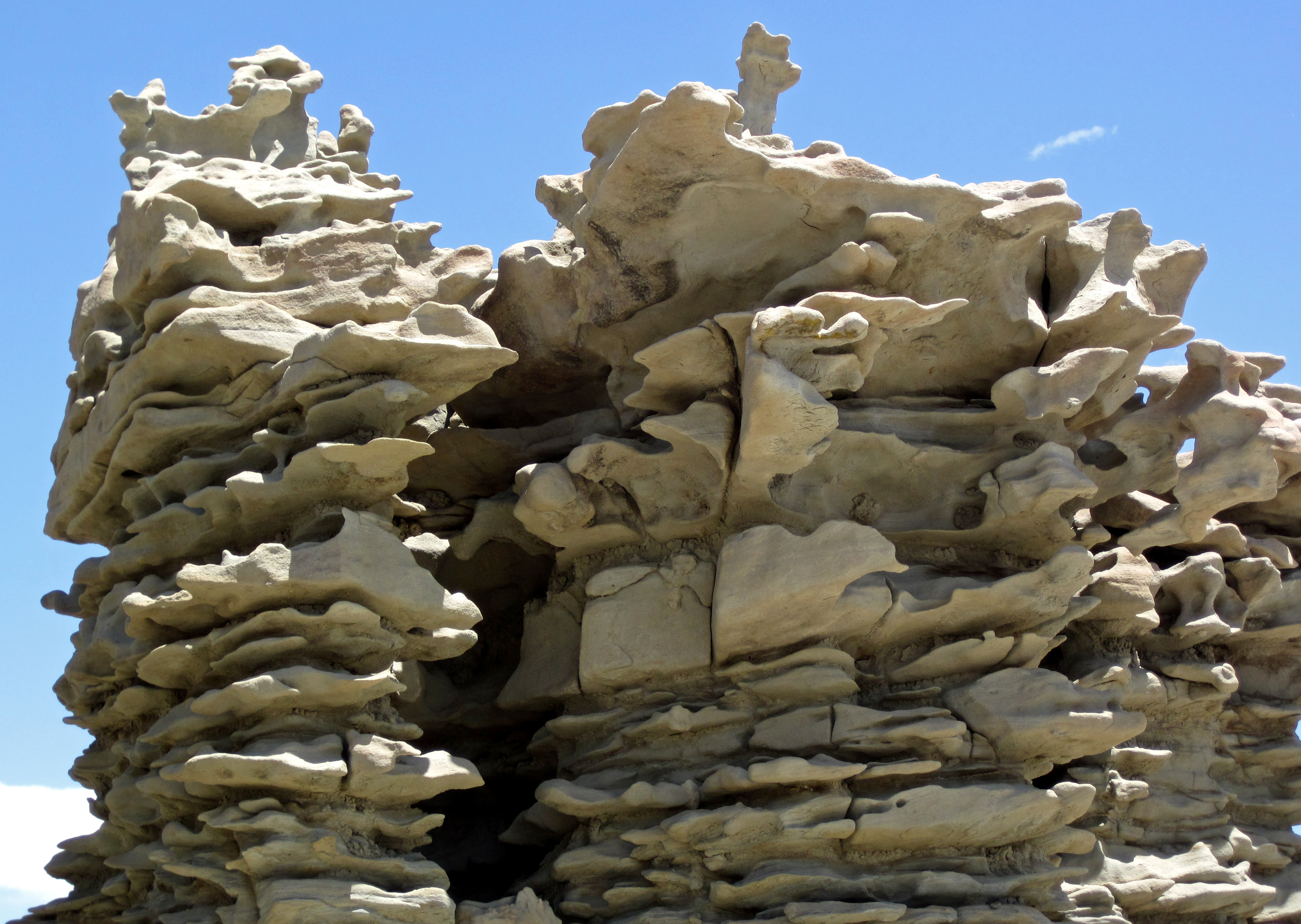
Differentially cemented and eroded sandstone in Fantasy Canyon, Utah, June 2012

Fantasy Canyon is a 10-acre (40,000 m^{2}) canyon containing unusual rock formations that were created through erosion and weathering. It is located about 27 miles (43 km) south of Vernal, in Uintah County, Utah, United States. Fantasy Canyon is managed by the Bureau of Land Management and is only accessible via the Fantasy Canyon Trail.

== Description ==
Even though the area is only about 10 acres (40,000 m^{2}) in size, it contains some of the most unusual geologic features in the world. The site was officially documented by early explorer and paleontologist Earl Douglass, who recorded the area by other names such as "The Devil's Playground" and "Hades Pit." He published photographs of this area in a 1909 publication called The Columbian Magazine.

The canyon is accessed by the 0.6-mile (0.97 km) Fantasy Canyon Trail, also known as the Fantasy Canyon Loop trail.

== Geology ==
The rocks of Fantasy Canyon, quartzose sandstones, were deposited during the Eocene Epoch. They date from around 38 to 50 million years ago. During the geologic period, the Uinta Basin was occupied by a large lake called Lake Uinta. The lake extended 120 miles (190 km) west to Heber City, 30 miles (48 km) east to Rangely, Colorado, south to the Book Cliff Divide, north to the Uinta Mountains, and was about a zero point five miles (0.80 km) deep.

Stratigraphy: member C, Uinta Formation, Eocene.

Fantasy Canyon is along the east shore of what was once Lake Uinta, where the sediments eroded from the surrounding high lands. Sediments were deposited and the once loose sands, silts, and clays were forged into sandstone and shale. Because of different rates of weathering, the more durable sandstone remained while the more easily weathered siltstone and shale washed away, yielding this spectacular scenery. Today's geologic formations of Fantasy Canyon will eventually give way to weather and then topple and erode into sand, but new formations will appear as the topsoil washes away. Because the delicate formations are so fragile the area is referred to as "Nature's China Shop." Names have been assigned to some of the rock formations, which resemble bleached-out coral, gargoyles, and stalagmites. Many of the rock clusters are highly fragile. The "teapot formation" collapsed in 2006.

== Mineralization ==
There are black ribbons of coal-like material along the small washes on the trail or as horizontal stripes in the rocks. This magnetic material is called magnetite (iron oxide).

There are inch-wide, black-colored, subvertical, northwest-southeast trending gilsonite dikes that have intruded the rocks at Fantasy Canyon. Gilsonite, named after U.S. Marshall Samuel H. Gilson, is a type of asphaltite-solidified hydrocarbon. Gilsonite was discovered in the early 1860s. Starting in the mid-1880s, Gilson promoted the material as a waterproof coating for wooden pilings, as an insulation for wire cable, and as a unique varnish.

== Fossils ==
The Eocene-aged Uinta Formation is fossiliferous. It contains widely scattered bones, mostly mammals, which roamed the Basin during the Eocene. Fossilized turtle shells are visible in the area.

== See also ==
- List of canyons and gorges in Utah
