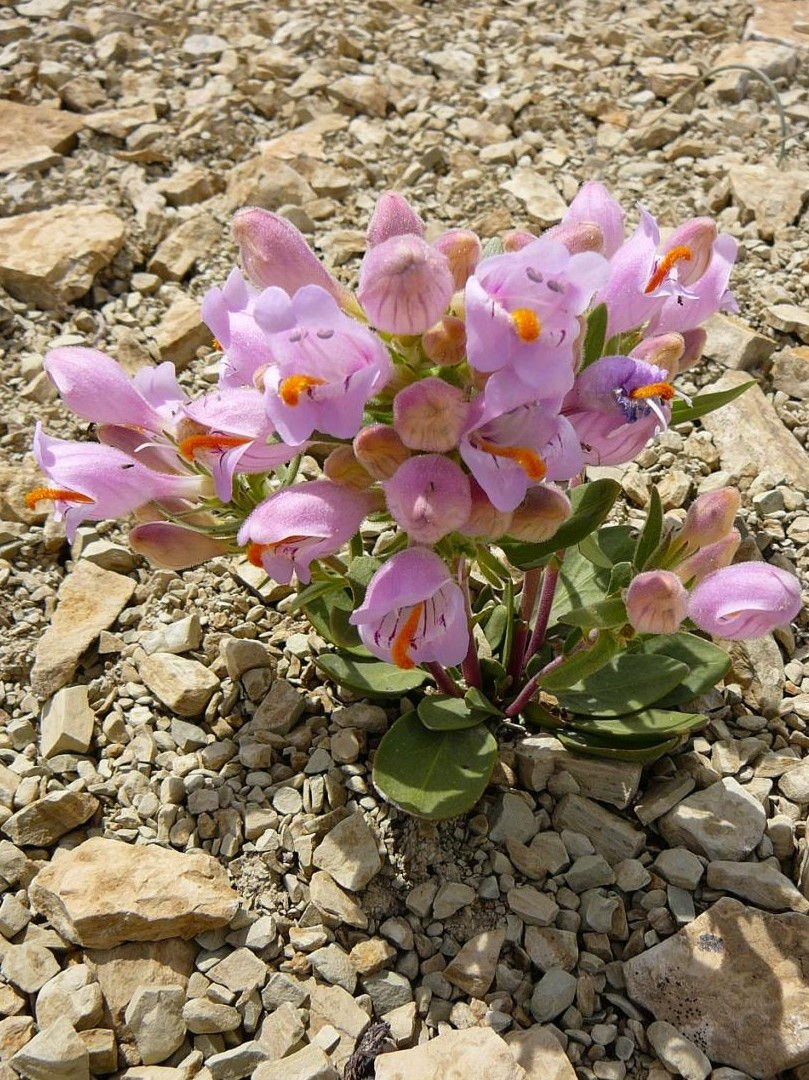

Conservation status
- Imperiled (NatureServe)

Scientific classification
- Kingdom: Plantae
- Clade: Tracheophytes
- Clade: Angiosperms
- Clade: Eudicots
- Clade: Asterids
- Order: Lamiales
- Family: Plantaginaceae
- Genus: Penstemon
- Species: P. grahamii

Binomial name
- Penstemon grahamii D.D.Keck

= Penstemon grahamii =

Species of flowering plant

Penstemon grahamii, known by the common names Uinta Basin beardtongue and Graham's beardtongue, is a species of flowering plant in the plantain family. It is native to Utah and Colorado in the United States.

This perennial herb produces one or more stems reaching up to about 20 centimeters tall. They are hairy, and in the inflorescence, glandular. The leaves are thick, leathery, and dark green to grayish in color. The basal leaves narrow toward the stem, and the upper leaves clasp the stem. The tubular flowers are between 3 and 4 centimeters long and pink to lavender in color with reddish nectar guides in the throat. The yellow, bearded staminode protrudes from the mouth of the flower. Blooming occurs in May and June.

This species is limited to calcareous shale originating from the Green River Formation in northeastern Utah and adjacent Rio Blanco County, Colorado. It grows in desert shrubland and pinyon-juniper woodland habitat.

Much of the terrain occupied by the plant contains oil shale, a valuable source of petroleum. The United States Fish and Wildlife Service proposed listing the plant with threatened status in 2006 when it appeared that extensive petroleum exploration could endanger the plant. The Service sought data from scientists, as well as from the Bureau of Land Management, which oversees 60% of the plant's habitat and leases land for petroleum exploration. The data provided by the BLM convinced the USFWS not to list the plant, and the proposal was withdrawn. The Union of Concerned Scientists then exposed the BLM's data as "misleading", stating "the plant does not have all the protections that the best available science indicates that it needs."
