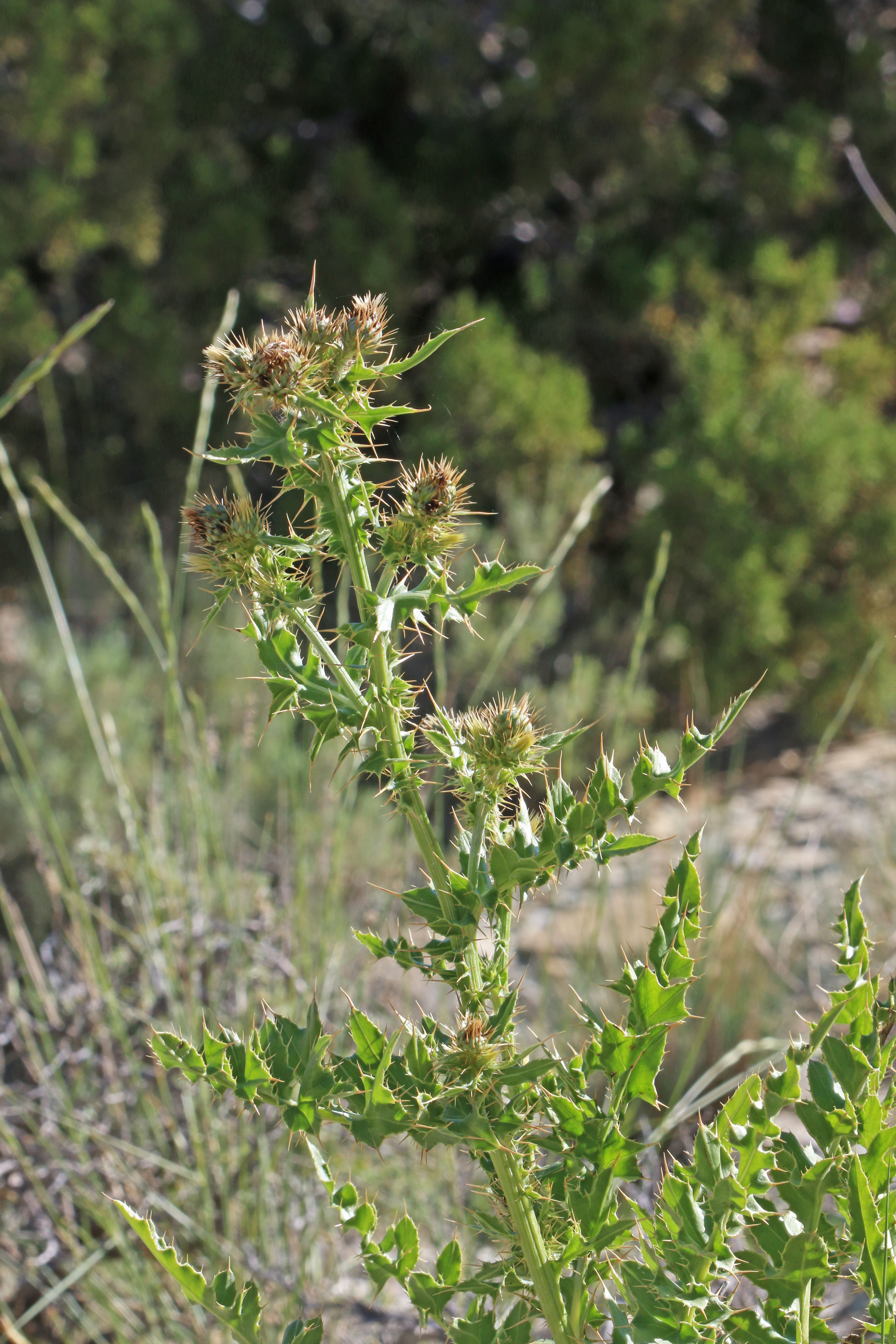

Conservation status
- Vulnerable (NatureServe)

Scientific classification
- Kingdom: Plantae
- Clade: Tracheophytes
- Clade: Angiosperms
- Clade: Eudicots
- Clade: Asterids
- Order: Asterales
- Family: Asteraceae
- Genus: Cirsium
- Species: C. barnebyi

Binomial name
- Cirsium barnebyi S.L. Welsh & Neese

= Cirsium barnebyi =

Species of thistle

Cirsium barnebyi, or Barneby's thistle, is a North American plant species native to the Rocky Mountains of the western United States. It grows in juniper woodlands, sagebrush scrub, etc., at elevations of 1,600–2,600 m (5,200–8,500 ft). It is reported from six counties in three states: Rio Blanco and Garfield Counties, Colorado; Uintah, Carbon and Duchesne Counties, Utah; and Carbon County, Wyoming.

Cirsium barnebyi is a sparsely-branched perennial herb up to 60 cm (24 in) tall, with a woody taproot. Leaves are oblong to elliptic, up to 35 cm (14 in) long, undulate (wavy), lobed with sharp spines along the edges. Flower heads 1-20, borne at the top of the plant or on the tips of the branches. The phyllaries (modified leaves around the base of the heads) bear sharp spines. Flowers are lavender to pinkish-purple.

== Gallery ==
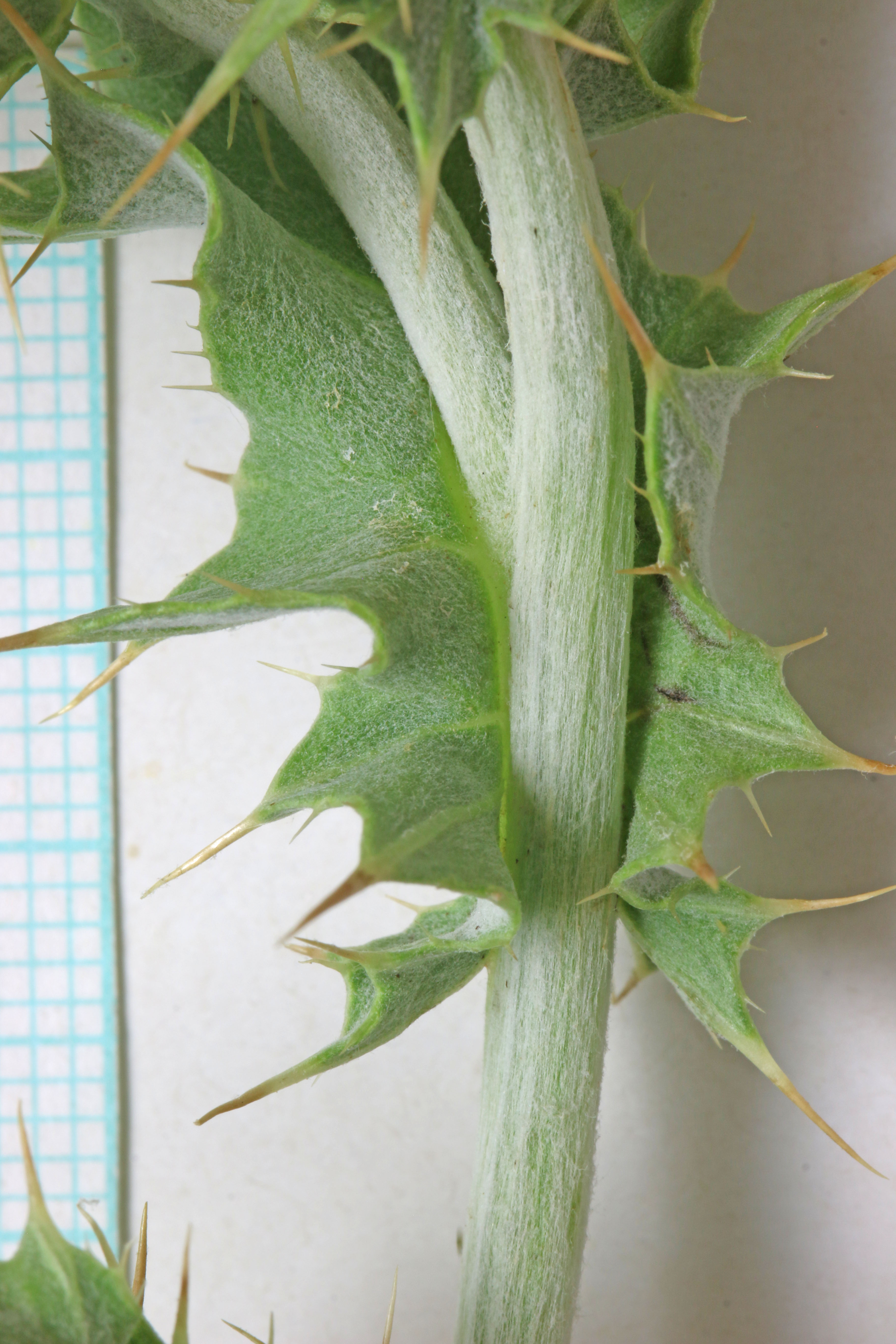
Leaf base

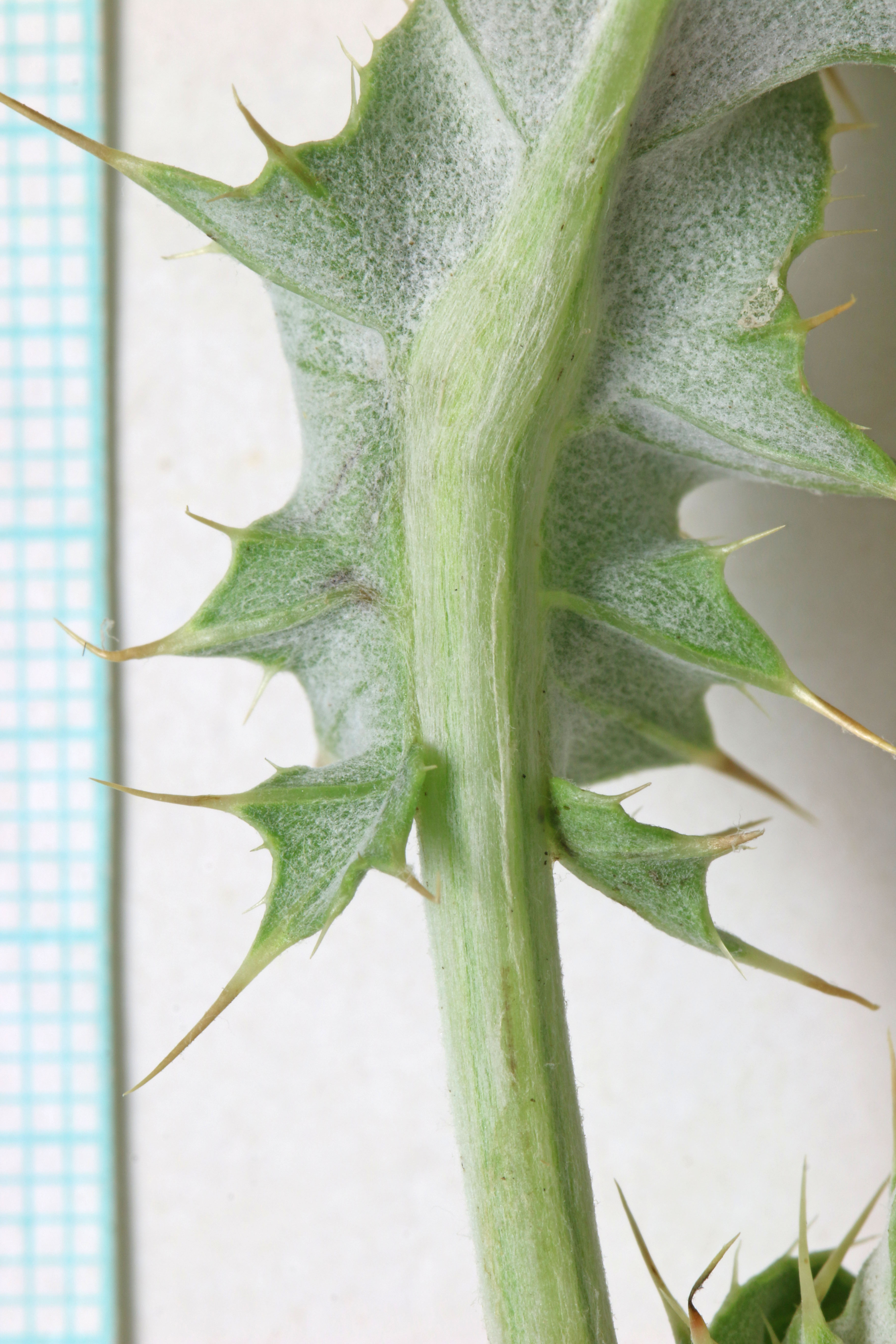
Leaf underside
