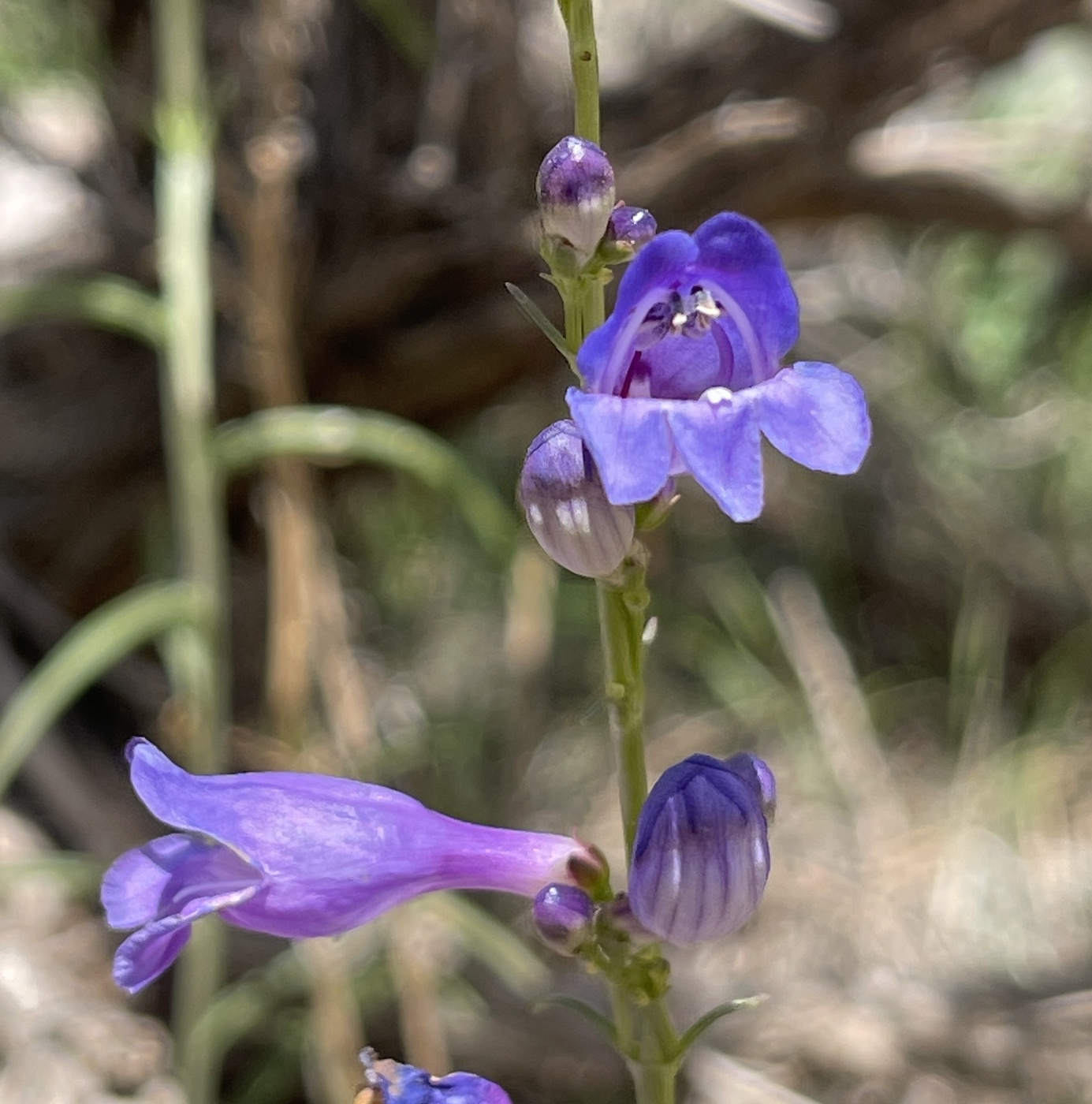
- In San Juan County, Utah

Conservation status
- Vulnerable (NatureServe)

Scientific classification
- Kingdom: Plantae
- Clade: Tracheophytes
- Clade: Angiosperms
- Clade: Eudicots
- Clade: Asterids
- Order: Lamiales
- Family: Plantaginaceae
- Genus: Penstemon
- Species: P. strictiformis

Binomial name
- Penstemon strictiformis Rydb.

Synonyms
- Penstemon strictus subsp. strictoformis

= Penstemon strictiformis =

Plant species in the veronica family

Penstemon strictiformis, also known as Mancos penstemon, is a species of penstemon in the veronica family. They are found only around the Four Corners region where the states of Colorado, New Mexico, Arizona, and Utah meet. They have pastel blue to purple flowers.

== Description ==
Mancos penstemon is a short-lived perennial plant with one or more herbaceous stems when mature. It can range in height from 11 to 70 centimeters (4.5 to 27.5 in), but is more typically 16 to 55 cm (6.5 to 21.5 in). The stems are hairless, but not glaucous, and grow straight upwards or outwards before curving to upright from a woody, branched caudex.

Plants will have both basal leaves, those attached directly to the base of the plant, and cauline leaves, ones that are attached to the stems. The basal leaves and low down on the stems measure 6 to 15 centimeters (2.4 to 5.9 in), but usually are not longer than 9 cm (3.5 in). However, they are just 5 to 12 millimeters wide. Their shape is lanceolate to oblanceolate, shaped like the head of a spear or reversed, with a tapering base that is attached directly to the plant without a leaf stem. The stems will have three to five pairs of leaves, the upper ones measuring 1.8–8 cm (0.7–3.1 in) wide and 3–18 mm in width. All leaves are hairless and are not glaucous, but can be more or less leathery in texture. They have edges without teeth or lobes, but can infrequently be somewhat curly.

The flowers in the inflorescence all face one direction, or nearly so, and are blue-lavender, light blue, or light purple in color. The sepal lobes are egg shaped to spear shaped. The flowers are 19 to 32 millimeters long and hairless both inside and out and do not have nectar guidelines. The throat of the flower can expand gradually or abruptly and is not constricted at the mouth. The staminode does not extend out of the mouth of the flower, measuring 8 to 15 mm long, and is sparsely to moderately covered in yellow or white hairs.

They are very similar in appearance to the Rocky Mountain penstemon (Penstemon strictus), but smaller both in the size of the whole plant and also with smaller leaves and flowers.

== Taxonomy ==
Penstemon strictiformis was scientifically described and named by the botanist Per Axel Rydberg in 1904. It is part of the genus Penstemon in the Plantaginaceae family. It was reclassified as a subspecies of Penstemon strictus by David D. Keck in 1939, however this name is not generally accepted by other botanists and Penstemon strictiformis is an accepted species according to Plants of the World Online.

=== Names ===
Penstemon strictiformis is known by the common name Mancos penstemon.

== Range and habitat ==
Mancos penstemon is native to the Four Corners region of the western United States in the states of Colorado, Utah, New Mexico, and Arizona. It is recorded as growing by the NRCS PLANTS database in four counties in northwest New Mexico, Santa Fe, Rio Arriba, McKinley, and San Juan. In Arizona it is known to occur in just Navajo and Apache counties. While it found in just San Juan County, Utah. Similarly, it is only known from Montezuma County, Colorado in the southwest corner of the state. It can be found at elevations of 1,700 to 2,400 meters (5,600 to 7,900 ft).

This species is grows in juniper and pinyon–juniper woodlands.

=== Conservation ===
The Mancos penstemon has not been evaluated by NatureServe since 1998. At that time they rated it as vulnerable (G3) at the global level. The reason for this rating is the limited range of the species without information about how common populations are in its range. They also rate it as vulnerable (S3) in Colorado and critically imperiled (S1) in Utah, but have not evaluated populations in New Mexico or Arizona.

== Cultivation ==
Mancos penstemon is grown in gardens, though it is not nearly as common as Rocky Mountain penstemon. They are more drought tolerant than Rocky Mountain penstemon.
