= Soldier Creek Dam =

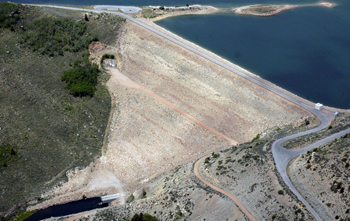
- Interactive map of Soldier Creek Dam
- Location: Wasatch County, Utah, United States
- Coordinates: 40°08′12″N 111°01′38″W
- Construction began: 1970
- Opening date: 1974
- Owner: U.S. Bureau of Reclamation

Dam and spillways
- Type of dam: Earthfill
- Impounds: Strawberry River
- Height: 272 ft (83 m)
- Length: 1,290 ft (390 m)
- Elevation at crest: 7,612 ft (2,320 m)

Reservoir
- Creates: Strawberry Reservoir
- Total capacity: 1,127,610 acre⋅ft (1.39089 km^{3})
- Catchment area: 170 mi^{2} (440 km^{2})
- Surface area: 17,300 acres (7,000 ha)

Soldier Creek Dam is an earthen dam on the Strawberry River, located within the Uinta National Forest in southern Wasatch County, Utah, United States.

== Description ==
The dam forms Strawberry Reservoir and is a principal feature of the Strawberry Valley Project, part of the Bonneville Unit of the Central Utah Project. The dam and reservoir were built and operated by the United States Bureau of Reclamation (USBR).

Constructed between 1970 and 1974, the dam replaced the earlier Strawberry Dam, built slightly upstream of the current site from 1911 to 1913. The new dam increased the storage capacity of Strawberry Reservoir from 283,000 acre-feet (0.349 km^{3}) to more than 1,120,000 acre-feet (1.38 km^{3}). The primary purpose of the dam is to store flows from the upper Strawberry River, as well as water diverted from eight tributaries of the Duchesne River, for diversion through the Strawberry Tunnel to supplement water supplies in the Utah Valley. Water from the Strawberry Tunnel eventually outlets into Sixth Water Canyon, the Diamond Fork (stream) and finally the Spanish Fork (river) before flowing into Utah Lake.

Soldier Creek Dam is a zoned earthfill embankment 272 feet (83 m) high and 1,290 feet (390 m) long, with a structural volume of 3,206,000 cubic yards (2,451,000 m^{3}). Water releases from the dam are controlled by outlet works with a bypass capacity of 2,830 cu ft/s (80 m^{3}/s). The dam controls runoff from a drainage area of 170 square miles (440 km^{2}).

== See also ==
- List of dams and reservoirs in Utah
