= Strawberry, Utah =

Unincorporated community in the state of Utah, United States

- Unincorporated community
- Location of Strawberry within the State of Utah Strawberry (the United States)
- Coordinates: 40°09′17.0″N 110°34′33.9″W
- Country: United States
- State: Utah
- County: Duchesne
- Time zone: UTC-7 (Mountain (MST))
  - Summer (DST): UTC-6 (MDT)

Strawberry is an unincorporated community in western Duchesne County, Utah, United States. Most of the inhabitants live along the Strawberry River between the Strawberry River pinnacles and Starvation Reservoir west of the city of Duchesne, the county seat of Duchesne County.

== History ==
Historical population
Census	Pop.	Note	%±
1920	183		—
1930	123		−32.8%
1940	89		−27.6%
1950	95		6.7%
Source: U.S. Census Bureau

1880-1905 In the 1880s, the hydrocabron Elaterite was discovered in several small canyons around Strawberry. In 1893 Judge J.T. McConnell of Salt Lake City secured a lease through Major Myton, the (Uintah) Indian Agent, and the same lease was approved by the Secretary of the Interior. Judge McConnell joined Raven mining company in 1899 and was granted two years to prospect and register all mining claims and a 10-year lease to mine the properties. In 1901 Raven had filed on 640 acres in Lake and Sam's canyons. A road was constructed from the old Fort Duchesne road at Rabbit gulch south and into the main canyon where the west end of liberty bridge sits today. The road followed Strawberry canyon up and forked at Skytzy canyon and then continued on to the mines in Sam's Canyon. Raven Mining company started commercial mining in 1899. The mines functioned for 30+ years and the miners lived around the mine sites and were mostly seasonal.

In 1900 A.M. Murdock of Heber City, approached Major Myton of the Uintah Indian reservation to purchase grazing permits for his cattle. He was given grazing permits in the upper Strawberry river area. Dave Murdock, brother of A.M. Murdock, had secured a contract to provide beef to the Ute tribe at Fort Duchesne. In the fall of 1904 they brought the herd out of the high grazing areas and made it to the river bottoms which is now covered by Starvation reservoir. Very heavy snows stranded the herd. With no feed the entire herd died. Dave Murdock named the area "Starvation Flats" from this experience.

1905-1910 In 1905 the Uintah Indian reservation was opened by the federal government to homesteaders. The land in the river bottoms of the Strawberry river was very desirable because of the semi-arid nature of the Uintah Basin. The first pioneers into the area started clearing the river bottoms of the thick underbrush of cottonwood and willows. Around 1911 two communities had developed, one in the flats between the main canyon and Rabbit Gulch, that had been known as "Starvation", five miles west of Duchesne and "Upper Strawberry" that sits in a wider part of the canyon four miles further west. Although both communities were located on the Strawberry river and only four miles apart.

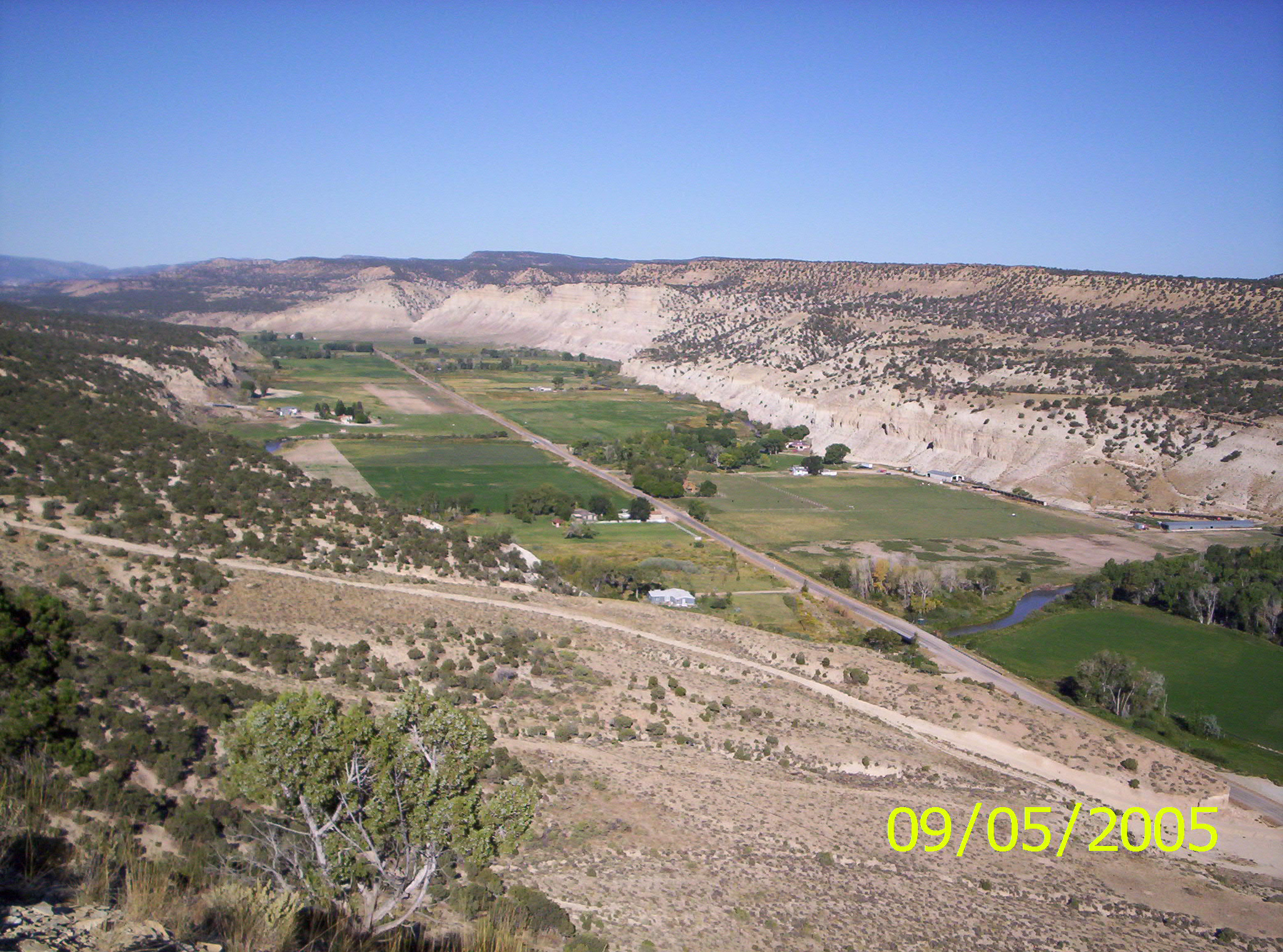
Looking west on the old "Riverside"

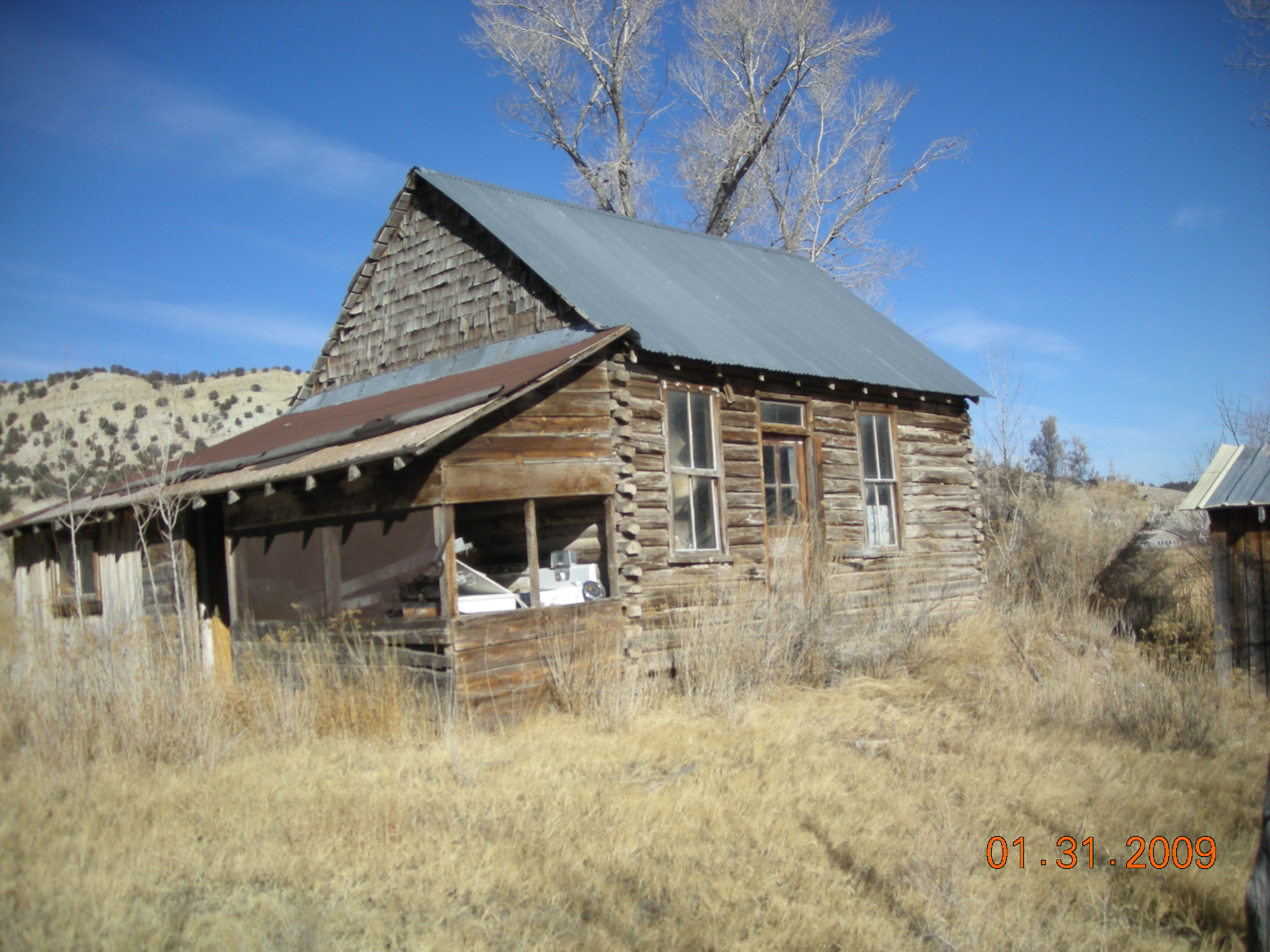
Riverside School, Main part built in 1912

1899–present, Upper Strawberry Although the farm land was very limited the community grew. The residents that did not own their own land worked as farm hands, ranch help, and miners. A.M. Murdock had a large cattle ranch in the upper part of the community that employed a number of people. Raven Mining Company owned a number of Elaterite mines in Skytzy, Dry, Lindley, and Sam's Canyon that employed a number of workers also. January 1, 1921, The residents in Upper Strawberry decided to change the name of the community to better identify themselves to the area residents. The name chosen was Riverside. The School Civic club presented a petition to the school board requesting the name of the school be changed from Strawberry No. 2 to Riverside. The school building acted as the community center and hosted church meetings, frequent dances, and activities. In the fall of 1920 the community had become frustrated with not getting bridges built across the river. They solicited the help of R.M. Pope and A.M. Murdock, who both had business interests in the area, for financial help in building the bridges. Six volunteers from the community agreed to work for half wages and the two bridges were built and completed within a couple months. This allowed for auto travel all the way through the community. Eventually the mines closed down and the big farms sold out. In the 1930s the CCC came in and replaced the original bridges with heavier cable support bridges. As the roads improved and the commute to the community of Duchesne became reasonable the Riverside School closed down. The community eventually lost its identity as Riverside and became a bedroom community of Duchesne. In 1952 high waters along the river flooded the canyon and washed out the CCC bridges and a couple of houses. The community spent the summer completely isolated until the county built new bridges in the fall. 1952 also brought the first power lines into the canyon. Before that some of the farmers used wind turbines and batteries for lighting. Phone service was brought in by Uintah Basin telephone in 1978. Pressurized irrigation water services were built for the lower end of the canyon in 2004. When you hear someone say "I live in Strawberry", the old community of Riverside is where they live.

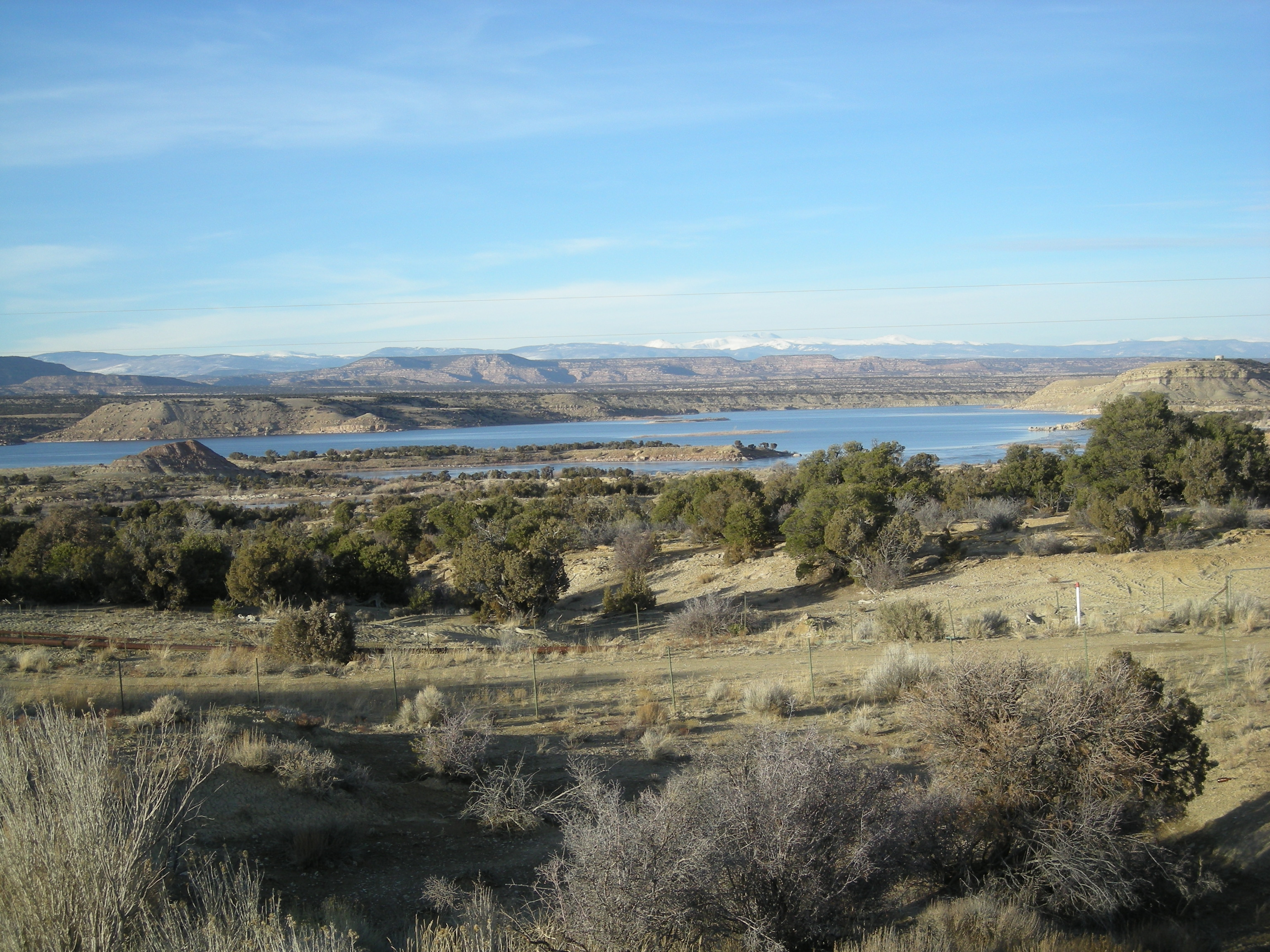
Looking across Starvation now covered by the reservoir

1911-1970, Starvation/Lower Strawberry The community of Starvation was named after Starvation flats, a wide area of the valley where Rabbit Gulch and the Strawberry river met. The community became a very good place to gather sheep in the spring for shearing. In the spring of 1911 some 60,000 sheep were sheared in new corrals that had been built. Starvation also had the advantage of the main road into Heber ran through the middle of the community. In April 1915 a post office was established in Starvation and called Strawberry. The first post mistress was Mrs. Vaughn Jolley. The first school in Starvation was built around 1911 and called the Strawberry school. On July 26, 1922 the school house burned to the ground from the sparks left by campers Bishop Ivie rebuilt the Strawberry school and had it back up and running by Sept 28 1923. A small cemetery was built to service the residents on a plateau south-west of the community. In 1924 the school board closed down the school and bused the students into Duchesne School. Victory Highway was built through the middle of the community but in 1970 all the land was bought by the Bureau of Reclamation to make way for Starvation Reservoir. US-40 was re-routed to the south past the cemetery and over the freedom bridge that passes over the canyon were the most southern end of the community was. The community is now gone and any remnants are under water.

== Geography ==
Strawberry sits in the river bottom of an ancient sea bed. The cliffs lining the canyon walls are made of sedimentary layers of shell. Strawberry is surrounding by Oil and Gas wells. Elaterite bubbles up like tar from the ground in areas along the river. In one location in the canyon natural gases bubble up into a spring and the associated foam can be lit on fire. Some of the springs in the area are saturated with alkaline and can be observed by the white deposits on the cliff ledges of the canyon walls.
