= Central Utah Project =

US federal water project

The Central Utah Project is a United States federal water project that was authorized for construction under the Colorado River Storage Project Act of April 11, 1956, as a participating project. In general, the Central Utah Project develops a portion of Utah's share of the yield of the Colorado River, as set out in the Colorado River Compact of 1922.

The Central Utah Project was authorized under the Colorado River Storage Project Act (CRSPA) (Public Law 84-485) on April 11, 1956, as a participating project of the Colorado River Storage Project to help meet Utah's long-term water needs.

As originally planned and authorized, the Central Utah Project consisted of six units or sub-projects: the Bonneville Unit, the Jensen Unit, the Vernal Unit, the Uinta Unit, the Upalco Unit, and Ute Indian Unit. The largest and most complex is the Bonneville Unit, which diverts water from the Uinta Basin, a part of the Colorado River Basin, to the Lake Bonneville Basin. The other units were designed to provide for development of local water supplies in the Uinta Basin.

The Central Utah Project develops water for irrigation, municipal, and industrial use; stream flows; and power generation. The project also provides recreation, fish and wildlife, flood control, water conservation, and water quality benefits.

Construction progress on the Central Utah Project proceeded slowly because of: the complexity of the project; complex environmental analyses; and inadequate and sporadic Federal funding. The slow progress prompted state and local officials to ask Congress to empower the Central Utah Water Conservancy District to complete the planning and construction of the remaining portion of the CUP, specifically the Bonneville Unit.

== Central Utah Project Completion Act ==
The Central Utah Project Completion Act (CUPCA) enacted on October 30, 1992, removed responsibility for completing the Central Utah Project, a federal water project, from the United States Bureau of Reclamation. For the first time in history, Congress designated a local entity (the Central Utah Water Conservancy District) as the planning and construction entity for a major Federal water project.

Construction progress on the Bonneville Unit has been slow because of the complexity of the project, the need for environmental analyses required by the National Environmental Policy Act of 1969, and inadequate federal funding. By the early 1990s, the slow progress prompted state and local officials to ask Congress to empower the Central Utah Water Conservancy District to complete the planning and the construction of the remaining portions of the Central Utah Project, including the Bonneville Unit. The Central Utah Water Conservancy District is a water conservancy district organized under the laws of the State of Utah, representing local water users in a ten-county district.

Congress responded to local concerns by enacting the Central Utah Project Completion Act on October 30, 1992. In the Central Utah Project Completion Act, Congress provided the direction for completing the Central Utah Project under a partnership among the Central Utah Water Conservancy District, the United States Department of the Interior, and the Utah Reclamation Mitigation and Conservation Commission, a federal commission created by the Central Utah Project Completion Act. The Central Utah Project Completion Act removed administrative responsibility for the Central Utah Project completion from the United States Bureau of Reclamation, placing it under the Office of the Secretary of the Interior. As a result, the Central Utah Project Completion Act Office, a branch of the Office of the Assistant Secretary for Water and Science located in Provo, Utah, administers the Central Utah Project Completion Act and the completion of the Central Utah Project. That is:

- Construction of the remainder of the Central Utah Project became the responsibility of the local water district—the Central Utah Water Conservancy District
- The Central Utah Project Completion Act established the Utah Reclamation Mitigation and Conservation Commission to oversee facilities to mitigate for the environmental effects of the Central Utah Project; and
- The Central Utah Project Completion Act placed responsibility for oversight of the project with the Secretary of the United States Department of the Interior.

=== Key Elements ===
- Water for the Future – The Central Utah Project Completion Act authorizes sufficient Federal funds to complete the Central Utah Project. The construction of CUP facilities provides water for Utah's future—including the future of the Uinta Basin. The Uinta Basin Replacement Project is a key element of the construction authorized under Central Utah Project Completion Act.
- Recreation Opportunities – Central Utah Project facilities provide a range of recreational opportunities.
- Fiscal Responsibility – The Central Utah Project Completion Act created a cost-sharing environment under which local funds augment federal funding in the planning and construction of Central Utah Project features—which engenders additional fiscal responsibility.
- Environmental Commitments – The Central Utah Project Completion Act created the Utah Reclamation Mitigation and Conservation Commission to coordinate and plan mitigation measures to meet environmental mitigation and conservation measures (including environmental commitments that preceded the Central Utah Project Completion Act). The Central Utah Project Completion Act also includes provisions for maintaining steam flows at prescribed minimum rates for the benefit of aquatic and riparian habitat.
- Water Conservation – The Central Utah Project Completion Act authorizes substantial funding for the planning and implementation of water conservation measures and projects.
- Local Development – The Central Utah Project Completion Act provides funding for local water development projects in areas that do not benefit directly from the Central Utah Project.
- Ute Indian Rights Settlement – CUPCA encourages the Northern Ute Tribe to quantify by compact its federal reserved water rights. It also settle long-outstanding claims against the United States arising out of the construction of the CUP by authorizing substantial funds to compensate the Ute Tribe for construction projects not undertaken by the United States. These funds provide for agricultural development, fish and wildlife enhancement, recreation improvement, and economic development.

=== Title II ===
Title II of the Central Utah Project Completion Act:

- Authorized the District to plan and construct the remaining project features
- Provided additional project ceiling to complete the project

•*Authorized the construction of the Uinta Basin Replacement Project, the Wasatch County Water Efficiency Project, and the Daniels Replacement Project

- Authorized funding for development of local water projects
- Established benchmarks for water conservation and authorized funding to assist in meeting those benchmarks, *Placed the oversight of the project completion under the Office of the Secretary of the Interior
- Authorized Reclamation to provide technical assistance.

=== Title III ===
Title III of the Central Utah Project Completion Act created the Utah Reclamation Mitigation and Conservation Commission and gave it responsibility for coordinating and planning mitigation measures, administering funding that had been previously authorized for environmental mitigation, and administering funding authorized for mitigation under the Central Utah Project Completion Act.

=== Title IV ===
Title IV of the Central Utah Project Completion Act lays out the mechanism for funding for the Utah Reclamation Mitigation and Conservation Commission.

=== Title V ===
Title V of the Central Utah Project Completion Act contains the Ute Indian Rights Settlement. In 1965, the Ute Tribe of the Uintah and Ouray Agency agreed to allow the Bureau of Reclamation to divert a portion of its water for Bonneville Unit water supply. In exchange, the Bureau of Reclamation agreed to plan and construct the Uintah, Upalco, and Ute Indian Units of the CUP to provide storage of the Tribe's water. The settlement compensates the Tribe for Reclamation's failure to meet its 1965 construction obligations. Under the settlement, the Northern Tribe received $49.0 million for agricultural development, $29.5 million for recreation and fish and wildlife enhancement, and $125 million for economic development.

== Units ==
As noted above, the Central Utah Project, as originally planned and authorized, consisted of six units or sub-projects: the Bonneville Unit, the Jensen Unit, the Vernal Unit, the Uintah Unit, the Upalco Unit, and the Ute Indian Unit.

=== Bonneville Unit ===
The Bonneville Unit is in central and northeastern Utah and provides water for the following counties: Salt Lake County, Utah County, Wasatch County, Summit County, and Duchesne County. Bonneville Unit water is developed by collecting and storing excess flows of several streams (principally tributaries to the Duchesne River), purchasing water rights, using part of the existing water supply in Utah Lake, and using project return flows and high flows entering Utah Lake.

The Bonneville Unit includes features that facilitate a trans-basin diversion of water from the Uinta Basin to the Bonneville Basin and development of local water resources in both basins. The completed Bonneville Unit will deliver a permanent supply of 42,000 acre-feet (52,000,000 m^{3}) of irrigation water and 157,750 acre-feet (194,580,000 m^{3}) of municipal and industrial water. It will provide sufficient stream flow to maintain fisheries in various streams in the Bonneville Unit area. It will also provide flood control, recreation, project power, leased power, and fish and wildlife improvements.

The Bonneville Unit is divided into six systems: the Starvation Collection System, in the Uinta Basin; the Strawberry Aqueduct and Collection System; in the Uinta Basin; the Municipal and Industrial System, in the Provo River Basin; the Ute Indian Tribal Development, in the Duchesne River Basin; the Diamond Fork System, in Diamond Fork Canyon; and the Utah Lake System, in Diamond Fork Canyon; Spanish Fork Canyon; and Utah Valley.

==== Starvation Collection System ====
The Starvation Collection System was completed in 1970. The system provides water for irrigation and municipal and industrial use, flood control, recreation, and fish and wildlife benefits in the Duchesne County area of the Uinta Basin. Water storage is provided by the 167,310-acre-foot (206,370,000 m^{3}) Starvation Reservoir, located on the Strawberry River, just above its confluence with the Duchesne River. Starvation Reservoir is filled by winter and spring flows of the Duchesne and Strawberry Rivers. Duchesne River water is diverted by Knight Diversion Dam and conveyed to the reservoir through the Starvation Feeder Conduit.

Starvation Reservoir provides a benefit to irrigators along the Duchesne River in the form of water delivery in the late summer and fall when streamflows typically decline below the levels that are needed for irrigation diversion. Water stored in Starvation Reservoir provides 24,400 acre-feet (30,100,000 m^{3}) of irrigation water and 500 acre-feet (620,000 m^{3}) of municipal and industrial water for use in the Uinta Basin. Starvation Reservoir provides an average of approximately 43,000 acre-feet (53,000,000 m^{3}) of water annually to irrigators to replace water diverted in the Strawberry Aqueduct and Collection System to Strawberry Reservoir. The reservoir provides fishery benefits and public recreation.

==== Strawberry Aqueduct and Collection System ====
The Strawberry Aqueduct and Collection System, completed in the late 1980s, diverts part of the flows of Rock Creek and eight other tributaries of the Duchesne River and conveys the diverted flows through the 36.8-mile-long (59.2 km) Strawberry Aqueduct to Strawberry Reservoir. Upper Stillwater Reservoir, with a capacity of 32,009 acre-feet (39,483,000 m^{3}), serves as a regulating reservoir at the head of the Strawberry Aqueduct to provide temporary storage during the high runoff period for later diversion to the aqueduct and storage in Strawberry Reservoir. Currant Creek Reservoir, with a total capacity of 15,671 acre-feet (19,330,000 m^{3}), diverts Currant Creek and five tributaries into the Strawberry Aqueduct. The Strawberry Aqueduct and Collection System provides 44,400 acre-feet (54,800,000 m^{3}) of instream flows for fishery mitigation purposes annually. The capacity of Strawberry Reservoir was enlarged from 273,000 acre-feet (337,000,000 m^{3}) to 1,106,500 acre-feet (1.3648×10^{9} m^{3}) by the construction of Soldier Creek Dam on the Strawberry River. Some of the water stored in the reservoir is released to the Strawberry River to provide fishery flows, but most of the stored water is for trans-basin diversion to the Bonneville Basin. In addition to water supply, the Strawberry Aqueduct and Collection System provides flood control, recreation, and fish and wildlife benefits.

==== Municipal and Industrial System ====
The Bonneville Unit Municipal and Industrial System provides municipal and industrial water to Salt Lake, Utah, and Wasatch Counties and supplemental irrigation water to Wasatch and Summit Counties. The system provides flood control, recreation, and fish and wildlife benefits. Jordanelle Dam (363,354 acre-feet (448,191,000 m^{3}), completed in 1994), near Heber City, is the major feature. Provo River flow that historically flowed into Utah Lake is stored in Jordanelle Reservoir and in Deer Creek Reservoir. Utah Lake water originating from the Provo River would be replaced by Bonneville Unit return flows to the lake, water rights previously acquired by the District in Utah Lake, direct releases of water from Strawberry Reservoir to Utah Lake, and flows that are surplus to Utah Lake rights.

The municipal and industrial water for northern Utah County (20,000 acre-feet (25,000,000 m^{3}) per year) and Salt Lake County (70,000 acre-feet (86,000,000 m^{3}) per year) is released from Jordanelle Reservoir or diverted under direct flow water rights and then rediverted from the Provo River into the Olmsted Flowline. From that diversion, the water is conveyed to the Salt Lake County area by the 38-mile-long (61 km) Jordan Aqueduct and to northern Utah County through the 14-mile-long (23 km) Alpine Aqueduct. Water for use in Wasatch County is released from Jordanelle Reservoir for delivery by local irrigation canals, current secondary municipal and industrial systems, and a future municipal and industrial treated water system. Water for use in Summit County is provided from Washington, Trial, and Lost Lakes in the headwaters of the Provo River or directly from the Provo River, both facilitated through an exchange with storage in Jordanelle Reservoir.

In 1999, the Central Utah Project Completion Act Office initiated a request for proposals for a Lease of Power Privilege on Jordanelle Dam. A Lease of Power Privilege is a partnership among public and private entities to provide for the non-federal generation of power on Reclamation facilities. Such leases are authorized under the Town Sites and Power Development Act of 1906 (43 U.S.C. 522) and the Reclamation Project Act of 1939 (43 U.S.C. 485h(c)). A Lease of Power Privilege is an alternative to the development of federal hydropower and grants the lessee the right to use, consistently with project purposes, water power head and storage for non-federal electric power generation and sale by the lessee.

By a process of requesting and reviewing proposals, the Central Utah Project Completion Act Office and the Western Area Power Administration selected the Central Utah Water Conservancy District and Heber Light & Power as joint potential lessees for power development at Jordanelle Dam. The Central Utah Project Completion Act Office and the lessees executed a lease agreement in 2005, after the approval of the environmental assessment for the project. Construction of the turbines and generators began in late 2005, and construction of the building began in late 2006. The project is expected to be fully operational by summer of 2008.

==== Diamond Fork System ====
After completion of the ULS, the Diamond Fork System will allow for the full trans-basin diversion of Bonneville Unit water from Strawberry Reservoir in the Colorado River drainage basin to Spanish Fork Canyon in the Bonneville Basin. The Diamond Fork System protects the Diamond Fork Creek and Sixth Water Creek riparian areas from damaging high flows. The Diamond Fork System was constructed in three main phases. The Bureau of Reclamation constructed the first phase; the Central Utah Water Conservancy District constructed the second and third phases under the Central Utah Project Completion Act. The first phase included the Syar Tunnel Inlet, the Syar Tunnel, the Sixth Water Aqueduct, and the Sixth Water Flow Control Structure, which together form a continuous 7.3-mile (11.7 km) conduit from Strawberry Reservoir to Sixth Water Creek and now discharges water into Sixth Water Creek. The second phase included the Diamond Fork Pipeline from Monks Hollow downstream to the mouth of Diamond Fork Creek. The third phase, now completed, bad a tunnel connection to the Sixth Water Shaft and Flow Control Structure, Tanner Ridge Tunnel, Upper Diamond Fork Pipeline, Upper Diamond Fork Flow Control Structure, connection to Upper Diamond Fork Tunnel, Upper Diamond Fork Tunnel, and connection to the Diamond Fork Pipeline. Flow control structures are located at Sixth Water Creek, Upper Diamond Fork Creek, and at Monks Hollow. The 19.8-mile-long (31.9 km) conduit will convey Bonneville Unit water and Strawberry Valley Project water to the mouth of Diamond Fork Canyon. The Diamond Fork System will remove a portion of the Strawberry Valley Project irrigation flows that were historically conveyed down Sixth Water Creek and Diamond Fork Creek. In-stream flows specified in the Central Utah Project Completion Act will be released into Sixth Water Creek and lower Diamond Fork Creek to enhance fisheries in these streams.

==== Ute Indian Tribal Development ====
The purpose of the Ute Indian Tribal Development Project is to mitigate stream-related fish and wildlife losses on Indian lands and other specific fish and wildlife losses associated with the Bonneville Unit. Bottle Hollow Reservoir was constructed to compensate the tribe for economic losses associated with stream fishing on the portion of Rock Creek located on the Uintah and Ouray Indian Reservation. With a surface area of 420 acres (1.7 km^{2}), the reservoir provides fishing opportunities, wildlife habitat, and a basis for recreation-oriented enterprises to provide additional employment and income for tribal members. The Lower Duchesne River Wetlands Mitigation Project, currently being planned by the Utah Reclamation Mitigation and Conservation Commission, the Central Utah Project Completion Act Office and the Ute Tribe, will create, restore, and otherwise enhance riparian wetland habitats along the Duchesne River as partial mitigation for the Bonneville Unit. The project has been planned in conjunction with the tribe and is intended to fulfill longstanding commitments to mitigate for impacts on wetland-wildlife habitats that arise from construction and operation of the Strawberry Aqueduct and Collection System and to provide additional wetland/wildlife mitigation to the tribe. Originally proposed in 1965, the project has undergone recent planning revisions and a final EIS will be published in 2008.

==== Utah Lake System ====
The Utah Lake System (ULS) is the final phase of the Bonneville Unit. On September 30, 2004, the Central Utah Project Completion Act Office filed the Utah Lake System Final Environmental Impact Statement l, and on December 22, 2004, the Assistant Secretary for Water and Science signed the Utah Lake System Record of Decision. The district completed the final planning document (the Supplement to the 1988 Definite Plan Report for the Bonneville Unit) l, which was approved by the Central Utah Project Completion Act Office and Reclamation on November 19, 2004. Contracts for implementation of the ULS have been negotiated and were executed on March 15, 2005. Construction of the ULS began in 2007.

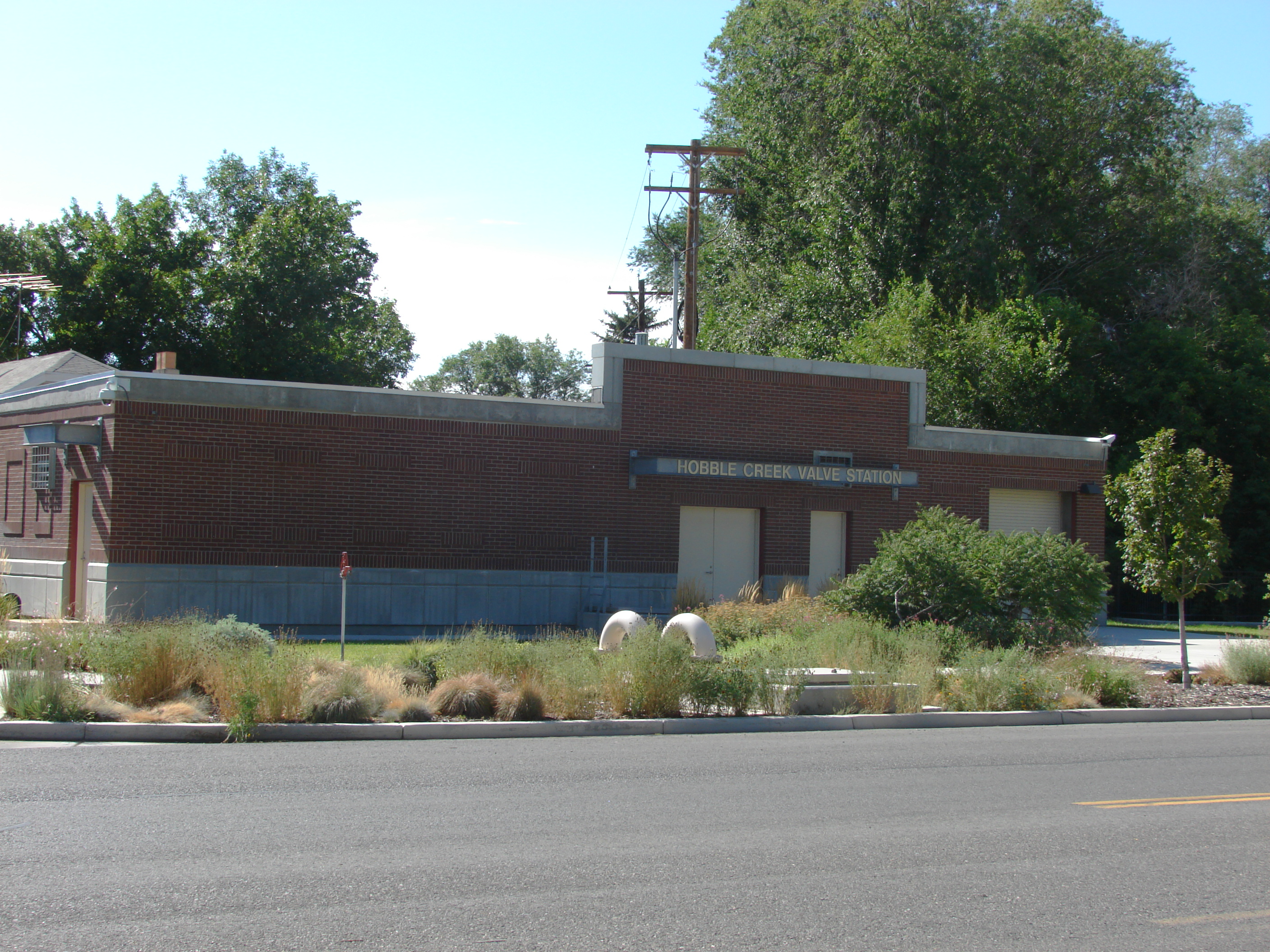
The Hobble Creek Valve Station along the Mapleton Springville Pipeline in Springville, July 2015

The Utah Lake System includes the following features:

- Sixth Water Powerplant and Transmission Line
- Upper Diamond Fork Powerplant and Underground Transmission Cable
- Spanish Fork River Flow Control Structure (already constructed)
- Spanish Fork Canyon Pipeline
- Spanish Fork–Santaquin Pipeline
- Santaquin–Mona Reservoir Pipeline
- Mapleton–Springville Lateral Pipeline
- Spanish Fork–Provo Reservoir Canal Pipeline

These features will deliver Utah Lake System municipal and industrial secondary water to southern Utah County cities; deliver water to Hobble Creek to provide June sucker spawning flows and supplemental flow during other times of the year, deliver water for supplemental flow in the lower Provo River, deliver municipal and industrial raw water to the Provo Reservoir Canal and the Jordan Aqueduct for conveyance to water treatment plants in Salt Lake County, and generate electric power incident to water deliveries at two hydropower plants. The proposed Sixth Water Powerplant will have a capacity of 45 MWh and the proposed Upper Diamond Fork Powerplant will have a capacity of 5 MWh. The Spanish Fork Canyon Pipeline and Spanish Fork–Santaquin Pipeline will convey up to 10,200 acre-feet (12,600,000 m^{3}) of SVP irrigation water shares of south Utah County municipalities through the new ULS pipelines when space is available.

The Utah Lake System yield includes 30,000 acre-feet (37,000,000 m^{3}) of municipal and industrial water that will be delivered into Salt Lake County;30,000 acre-feet (37,000,000 m^{3}) of municipal and industrial water that will be delivered to south Utah County municipalities, which will assign about 3,000 acre-feet (3,700,000 m^{3}) to the Central Utah Project Completion Act Office for in-stream flows; and 40,310 acre-feet (49,720,000 m^{3}), minus conveyance losses, which will be delivered to Utah Lake for exchange to Jordanelle Reservoir under the Municipal and Industrial System. Of the 40,310 acre-feet (49,720,000 m^{3}), about 16,273 acre-feet (20,072,000 m^{3}) would be released down the Spanish Fork River during the winter months, an average of 16,000 acre-feet (20,000,000 m^{3}) would be conveyed through new pipelines to the lower Provo River to assist in meeting in-stream flows, and about 8,037 acre-feet (9,913,000 m^{3}) would be conveyed to Hobble Creek to assist in the recovery of the June sucker, an endangered fish indigenous to Utah Lake.

=== Jensen Unit ===
The Jensen Unit, in Uintah County in northeastern Utah, serves Ashley Valley and the area that extends east of the valley to the Green River. The Jensen Unit, as originally planned, was intended to develop about 22,600 acre-feet (27,900,000 m^{3}) of water annually: 18,000 acre-feet (22,000,000 m^{3}) for municipal and industrial use and 4,600 acre-feet (5,700,000 m^{3}) for irrigation; 444 acres (180 ha) agricultural acres receive a full irrigation water supply and 3,640 acres (1,470 ha) receive a supplemental water supply. The Uintah Water Conservancy District operates the Jensen Unit.

Initial planning for the Jensen Unit in the 1970s anticipated full-scale oil shale production was imminent, requiring large amounts of municipal and industrial water. For that reason, the Jensen Unit water supply was skewed to municipal and industrial water development. The development of 12,000 acre-feet (15,000,000 m^{3}) of municipal and industrial water required the construction of the Burns Bench Pumping Plant. By the time that the dam and aqueduct were nearing completion, it was clear the oil shale production would not begin for some time. As a result, the Burns Bench Pumping Plant was not constructed, reducing the Jensen Unit municipal and industrial water supply to 6,000 acre-feet (7,400,000 m^{3}).

Of the 6,000-acre-foot (7,400,000 m^{3}) municipal and industrial project water supply, the local water users could use only 2,000 acre-feet (2,500,000 m^{3}). In Section 203 (g) of the Central Utah Project Completion Act, Congress instructed the Department of the Interior to enter into a contract to reduce the municipal and industrial repayment obligation to 2,000 acre-feet (2,500,000 m^{3}) and to describe the procedure for future marketing of the remaining municipal and industrial water. Congress also doubled the size of the conservation pool in Red Fleet Reservoir to 4,000 acre-feet (4,900,000 m^{3}). The expanded conservation pool reduced the yield of the reservoir by 700 acre-feet (860,000 m^{3}) and thereby reduced the unmarketed municipal and industrial supply to 3,300 acre-feet (4,100,000 m^{3}).

In the 1990s, Reclamation discovered that irrigation drains constructed as part of the project were delivering unacceptable levels of selenium to Stewart Lake. In 1999, Reclamation committed 780 acre-feet (960,000 m^{3}) of the unmarketed municipal and industrial supply from the reservoir to Stewart Lake for mitigation purposes, which left an available unmarketed municipal and industrial supply of 2,520 acre-feet (3,110,000 m^{3}).

In recent years, oil production in the area has boomed, and oil shale production is approaching feasibility. Accordingly, water user interest in contracting for the remaining unmarketed municipal and industrial supply and the constructing the Burns Bench Pumping Plant has renewed.

The Jensen Unit, as constructed, consists of the Red Fleet Dam and Reservoir, the Tyzack Pumping Plant and Aqueduct, and the irrigation drains.

==== Red Fleet Dam and Reservoir ====
Construction of Red Fleet Dam and Reservoir began in 1977 and was completed in 1980. About 10 miles (16 km) northeast of Vernal, Utah, the dam is zoned earthfill with a structural height of 144 feet (44 m) above the bed of Big Brush Creek. The crest length is 1,670 feet (510 m) long and 30 feet (9.1 m) wide. Red Fleet Reservoir has a total capacity of 26,000 acre-feet (32,000,000 m^{3}), of which 24,000 acre-feet (30,000,000 m^{3}) is active storage. The reservoir has a surface area of 521 acres (2.11 km^{2}) at the normal water surface elevation of 5,608.2 feet (1,709.4 m).

==== Tyzack Pumping Plant and Aqueduct ====
Tyzack Pumping Plant, near the downstream end of the outlet works of Red Fleet Dam, delivers water from the Red Fleet Reservoir through the discharge line to Ashley Valley Treatment Plant. It is designed to pump up to an average of 18,000 acre-feet (22,000,000 m^{3}) annually. The aqueduct is a pressurized pipe extending 11.7 miles (18.8 km) from the pumping plant to Ashley Creek. Construction of both the pumping plant and the aqueduct were completed in 1983.

==== Irrigation drains ====
Drainage facilities were constructed for about 700 acres (2.8 km^{2}) of project land. The construction consists of 6.17 miles (9.93 km) of drains including 1.4 miles (2.3 km) of open outlet drains and 4.7 miles (7.6 km) of closed lateral drains. All drains have a design depth of about 10 feet (3.0 m). The land requiring drains was identified as either drainage-deficient at the time of investigation or likely to develop deficiencies after, the project's development.

=== Vernal Unit ===
The Vernal Unit is located near Vernal, in the Ashley Valley of northeastern Utah. The Vernal Unit provides a supplemental water supply for the irrigation of about 14,781 acres (59.82 km^{2}) as well as 1,600 acre-feet (2,000,000 m^{3}) of municipal and industrial water for the communities of Vernal, Naples, and Maeser. Construction of the Vernal Unit began in 1959 and was completed in 1963. The Uintah Water Conservancy District operates the Vernal Unit.

The Vernal Unit consists of Steinaker Dam and Reservoir and various diversion and conveyance facilities, including the Thornburgh Diversion Dam, the Steinaker Feeder Canal, and the Steinaker Service Canal.

==== Steinaker Dam and Reservoir ====
Flows of Ashley Creek are stored by Steinaker Dam, which was constructed off l-stream in Steinaker Draw. The dam is a zoned earthfill structure with a height of 162 feet (49 m), a crest length of 1,997 feet (609 m), and a volume of 1,892,000 cubic yards. Steinaker Reservoir has a total capacity of 38,173 acre-feet (47,086,000 m^{3}) and a surface area of 820 acres (3.3 km^{2}). In 1993, Steinaker Dam and Reservoir began modifications to comply with the Safety of Dams requirements. The modifications included excavating the clay foundation material downstream of the toe of the dam. Dam modification was completed in September 1994. The construction resulted in a stability berm at the downstream toe.

==== Diversion and Carriage Facilities ====
The Thornburgh Diversion Dam diverts water from Ashley Creek and conveys it eastward to the Steinaker Reservoir by the 2.8-mile (4.5 km) Steinaker Feeder Canal. Reservoir water is released to Steinaker Service Canal and conveyed south 11.6 miles (18.7 km) to existing canals and ditches.

=== Uintah and Upalco Units ===
Section 203(a) of the Central Utah Project Completion Act provided for the construction of the Uinta Basin Replacement Project to replace, in part, the Uintah and Upalco Units, which have never been constructed. The Central Utah Water Conservancy District completed the construction of the primary features of the Uintah Basin Replacement Project in 2006.

Also, Public Law 107-366, enacted December 19, 2002, deauthorized the Uintah and Upalco Units, transferring the authorization to the Bonneville Unit for construction of the Uintah Basin Replacement Project, Utah Lake System, and other Central Utah Project Completion Act purposes.

=== Ute Indian Unit ===
The Ute Indian Unit included a pipeline from Flaming Gorge Dam and Reservoir to the Uinta Basin. Because of both engineering and environmental challenges, the Ute Indian Unit was never constructed. Under the provisions of the Ute Indian Rights Settlement, the United States settled with the Ute Tribe of the Uinta and Ouray Reservation for its failure to complete the Ute Indian Unit.

== Recreation facilities ==
The reservoirs constructed as part of the Central Utah Project offer recreation opportunities.

=== Bonneville Unit ===
==== Jordanelle Dam and Reservoir ====
Jordanelle Reservoir is the newest reservoir, constructed in the 1980s. There are two main developed recreation areas, Hailstone and Rock Cliff. Hailstone is a large campground and day-use area on the west side of the reservoir. It is the side that experiences the most intensive use, including walk-in and RV camping, motorized boating, personal watercraft launch area, three group use pavilions, 41 family picnic sites, and a marina store and restaurant. It is the favored location for boaters and RV campers. Rock Cliff Nature Center, along the Upper Provo River, includes a wetlands boardwalk and interpretive walk, walk-in camping, picnicking, river fishing, and bird watching in the riparian corridor. It offers visitors a quieter experience than Hailstone.

Recreation and public use at Jordanelle Reservoir is managed by the Utah Division of State Parks under an agreement with Reclamation. Jordanelle offers ongoing interpretive programs for school-aged children as well as nature hikes and boating safety programs throughout the recreation season.

Utah State Parks reconstructed and expanded the boat ramp at Rock Cliff in 2004. Additional parking was also installed to accommodate the increasing numbers of visitors. The Rock Cliff Nature Center received a Conservation Assessment Program (CAP) grant from the Institute of Museum and Library Services and Heritage Preservation. The nature center will use funds and CAP expertise to identify conservation needs of its collection and to recommend ways to improve collection conditions.

==== Soldier Creek Dam and Strawberry Reservoir ====
The Strawberry Dam and Reservoir were enlarged in the 1980s under CRSPA authority, before the enactment of CUPCA. As part of Reclamation's commitment to provide recreation opportunities, new facilities were built. There are four main developed areas: Strawberry Bay, Soldier Creek, Renegade Point, and Aspen Grove.

- Strawberry Bay features 345 campsites. The picnic areas have shelters, l and there are evening interpretive programs available in the summer. There is an interpretive trail from the visitor center. A fish-cleaning station is available near the reservoir. In the winter, there are groomed snowmobile trails and ice fishing access. There are also a gas station, restaurant, a grocery store, and an amphitheater.

Renegade Point has 66 campsites and a trail from the campground leads to the eastern arm of the reservoir or south along Poison Ridge to Big Springs.

- Soldier Creek has 166 camp sites and 3 group picnic areas, some with shelters. Day use fishing is available on the northern and eastern sides of the lake, and there is a scenic overlook for those who wish to make a loop drive.
- Aspen Grove features 52 campsites"and a trail follows the shoreline back to the main part of the reservoir and Renegade Point. There are day-use areas nearby, along the Strawberry River and at Soldier Creek, near the dam. There is also a small marina store and fish cleaning station here.

Recreation management at Strawberry Reservoir is under the jurisdiction of the US Forest Service, Uinta National Forest. The managed recreation season is May to October and there is high use on holidays, and weekends. Ice fishing is very popular during the winter months. Available fish species include rainbow and cutthroat trout. Strawberry Reservoir is considered by many to be Utah's premier trout fishing lake.

==== Starvation Dam and Reservoir ====
Fred Hayes State Park at Starvation (formerly known as Starvation State Park) was established in 1972, two years after construction of the dam. The Utah Division of State Parks manages recreation at the reservoir under agreement with Reclamation. Facilities include 54 recreational vehicle (RV) sites (without utilities), 20 tent sites, group camp sites, a group day-use pavilion, RV waste disposal, showers, drinking water, modern restrooms, and vault toilets in more remote areas. There is an annual walleye fishing tournament that has become quite popular, with trophy fish being caught each year. The park and the reservoir offer numerous coves, remote beaches and unusually-blue water, which is actually the reflection of the sky. Off-road vehicle use is allowed in some areas; however, visitors should consult with State Park employees on areas that are open to use.

==== Currant Creek Dam and Reservoir ====
Currant Creek Reservoir is a high-elevation lake within a forest setting. Development began in 1977 with the construction of an earth-fill dam, and the reservoir finished filling in 1982. The reservoir shoreline is 85 percent under the jurisdiction of the US Forest Service, with the remaining 15 percent being private with restricted access. Recreation management at Currant Creek is also under the jurisdiction of the US Forest Service, Uinta National Forest.

There is a campground at the reservoir, with 49 campsites, tent sites, picnic areas, swimming, toilets, and a boat ramp. Winter access is restricted, and as the canyon is not plowed.

==== Upper Stillwater Dam and Reservoir ====
Upper Stillwater Reservoir is another high-mountain reservoir that has one main campground, Rock Creek. The reservoir serves as a popular trailhead into the High Uintas Wilderness Area, with the boundary only one mile north of the dam, near the high water line for the reservoir. Recreation management is under the jurisdiction of the U.S. Forest Service, Ashley National Forest. The managed recreation season is from June to September with high use on holidays and weekends. Available fish species include rainbow, brown, and brook trout.

=== Jensen Unit ===
==== Red Fleet Dam and Reservoir ====
Red Fleet Reservoir, near Vernal, Utah, is the principal feature of the Jensen Unit. Recreation management at Red Fleet Reservoir is performed by the Utah Division of State Parks, under an agreement with Reclamation. Facilities include a small sandy beach, boat launching ramp, two modern rest rooms, 29 campsites, 32 covered picnic tables, and fish cleaning and sewage disposal stations. A dinosaur track way, dating back 200 million years, was discovered on the east side of the reservoir.

=== Vernal Unit - Steinaker Dam and Reservoir ===
Steinaker Reservoir near Vernal, is the principal feature of the Vernal Unit. Recreation at Steinaker Reservoir is managed by the Utah Division of State Parks under an agreement with Reclamation. The park was opened to the public in 1964. Sandy beaches, swimming, boating, and waterskiing top the list of activities. Year-round fishing is for rainbow trout and largemouth bass.

Facilities include a boat launching ramp, modern restrooms, sewage disposal station, 31 individual campsites, and two group-use pavilions. An accessibility evaluation has been completed at Steinaker Reservoir.
