= Elaterite =

Naturally-occurring brown elastic substance

Elaterite, also known as aeonite, elasticite, elastic bitumen, or mineral caoutchouc, is a brown, often sticky, hydrocarbon. First discovered at Castleton, Derbyshire, in England, elaterite is naturally occurring but not considered a distinct mineral, but rather a form of bitumen. It has sometimes been confused with coorongite, found in Australia, but it has been determined that the origins of the two substances differ.

Elaterite was historically used for waterproofing and in some paints or varnishes, and is of interest in amateur geology because of its unusual characteristics.

== History and etymology ==
Elaterite was first discovered at Castleton in Derbyshire, England.

The origin of the name elaterite lies in the Greek word ελατηρ, meaning "pine", so named as it was assumed to have formed from the resin in pine trees. It is or has also been known as aeonite, elasticite, elastic bitumen, or mineral caoutchouc.

== Description ==
The substance varies somewhat in consistency, being sometimes soft, elastic and sticky, like India rubber, and occasionally hard and brittle. It is usually dark brown in colour and slightly translucent.

It is not considered to be a mineral species.

Although coorongite is of a very similar composition to elaterite, it is not the same substance nor of the same origin.

== Occurrence in nature ==
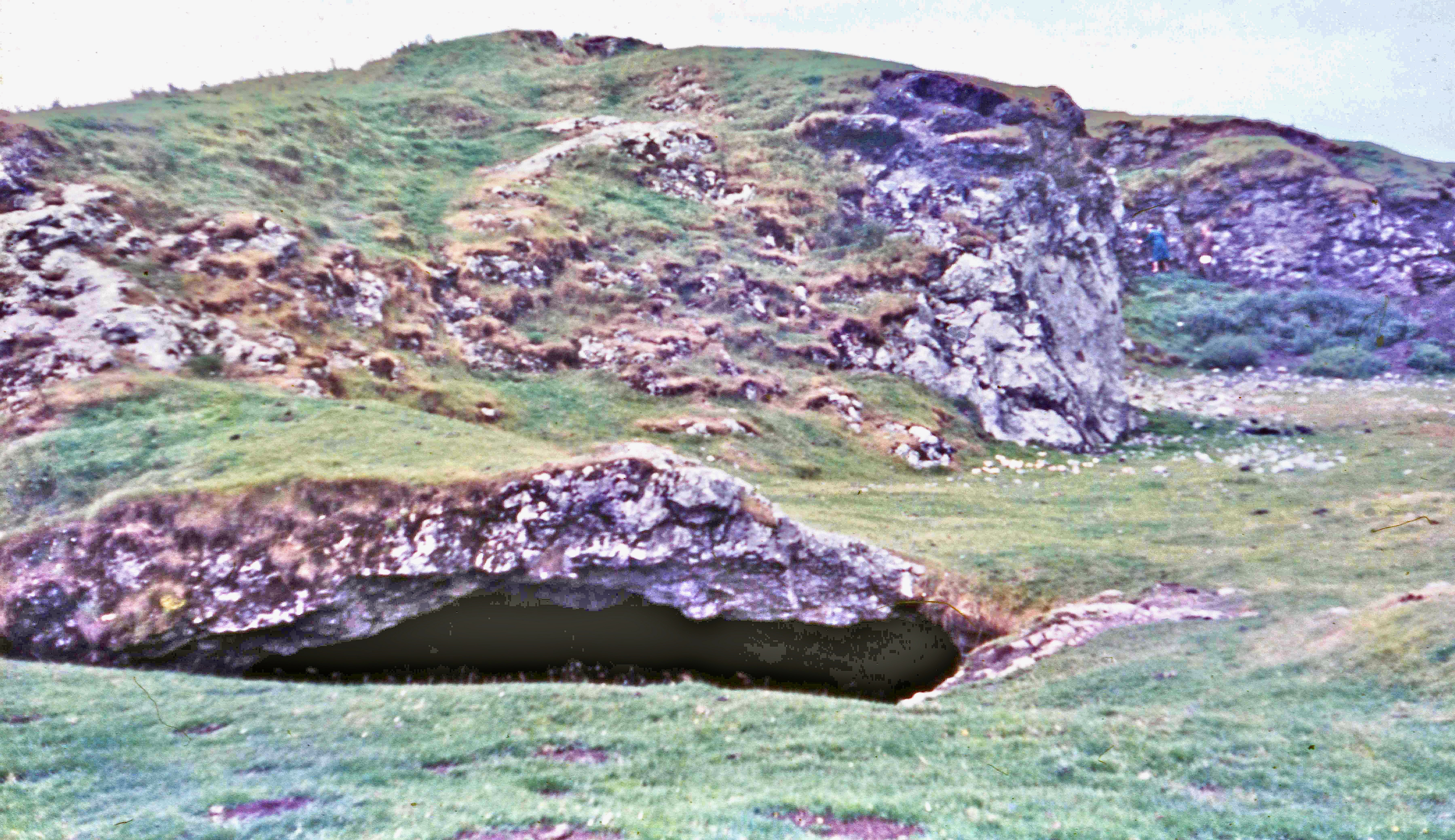
Cave and elaterite, Windy Knoll quarry

- Castleton, Derbyshire: Elaterite can be found beside the Windy Knoll Cave and the lead mines of Odin in Derbyshire, England, UK.
- Strawberry, Utah, US: Elaterite can be found in the Indian Canyon, Sams Canyon, Dry Fork, and Lake canyon, as well as in tributaries of the Strawberry River in Duchesne County. It occurs in vertical veins 1–22 in (25–559 mm) wide, 2–200 ft (0.61–60.96 m) high, and a maximum length of 3.25 mi (5.23 km).
- Nantes, France
- Two locations in Bolivia: Gallofa mine in Colquechaca Municipality and Animas-Chocaya in Atocha Municipality
- Besner Mine, Henvey Township, Ontario, Canada
- Lime Rock, Rhode Island, Connecticut, US
