= Uinta Basin Replacement Project =

In Section 203(a) of the Central Utah Project Completion Act, the United States Congress authorized a federally authorized and funded replacement project to replace the Uinta and Upalco Units of the Central Utah Project (CUP) which were not constructed. The replacement project is the Uinta Basin Replacement Project (UBRP). The UBRP will provide: 2,500 acre-feet (3,100,000 m^{3}) of irrigation water; 3,000 acre-feet (3,700,000 m^{3}) of municipal and industrial water; reduced wilderness impacts; increased instream flows; and improved recreation. Design work began in 2002. Construction began in 2004 and is anticipated to be completed in 2011. The Central Utah Water Conservancy District is responsible for construction. The United States Department of the Interior oversees funding and compliance with law and environmental regulation.

== Description of the Uinta Basin ==
The Uinta Mountains are the only major mountain range running east to west in North America. The Uinta Basin lies to the south of the Uinta Mountains and is fed by creeks and rivers flowing south from those mountains. Many of the principal rivers (Strawberry River, Currant Creek, Rock Creek, Lake Fork River, and Uinta River) flow into the Duchesne River which feeds the Green River—a tributary of the Colorado River.

The basin is the location of the Ute Tribe of the Uinta and Ouray Reservation (Tribe) which is commonly referred to as the Northern Ute Tribe, as well as the cities of Duchesne, Roosevelt, and Vernal. When oil prices are sufficiently high to overcome the cost of transportation to areas outside the basin, the area's oil industry roars to life (as it has in the past two years). Ordinarily, agriculture (chiefly cattle operations) is the lifeblood of the basin economy; and, in the basin, irrigation is the lifeblood of agriculture. Wilderness designation protects much of the Uinta Mountains. The mountains and associated streams are an important ecological resource.

== Water Development in the Uinta Basin ==
Interests competing for Uinta Basin water include: non-Indian irrigators, the Tribe, the cities, the oil industry, and the natural environment. All water development in the basin has been intended to serve one or more of these interests.

The UBRP is founded on and entwined with other water development in the basin. Key stages in that development are the establishment of the Northern Ute Reservation, homesteading and early water development, the Uinta Indian Irrigation Project, the Moon Lake Project, the CUP as originally planned (with the Uinta and Upalco Units), and the current UBRP.

- The Northern Ute Reservation — The Northern Ute Reservation was established in 1861 and tribal water rights associated with the creation of the reservation share that filing date. To date, the Tribe has not fully asserted its water right claims. An adjudication of Uinta Basin water rights begun by the Utah state engineer in 1956 was placed in abeyance while the Tribe, the State of Utah, and the Secretary of the Interior negotiated a water rights compact. These negotiations, in one form or another, have continued for over forty years, although progress toward agreement has occurred since 2007.
- Homesteading and Early Water Development — The reservation was opened for homesteading by non-Indians in 1905. During the early decades of the twentieth century, both Indian and non-Indian irrigation systems were constructed, including the construction of the High Mountain Lakes.
- The Uinta Indian Irrigation Project - The principal Indian irrigation project in the Basin is the Uinta Indian Irrigation Project. The Bureau of Indian Affairs (BIA) designed and constructed this project. By 1935, it was irrigating over 77,000 acres (310 km^{2}) of Indian land. Today, the UIIP continues to serve Indian and non-Indian irrigators in the Lake Fork drainage and elsewhere in the Basin. It continues to be owned and operated by BIA.
- The Moon Lake Project - In the 1930s, the Bureau of Reclamation designed and constructed the Moon Lake Project on the Lake Fork River. The Association operates and maintains the Moon Lake Project on behalf of the Bureau of Reclamation and will operate and maintain the enlarged Big Sand Wash Dam and Reservoir.
- The Central Utah Project –

In 1956, congress created the Colorado River Storage Project, authorizing the CUP (as well as other Reclamation projects). The CUP provided for the trans-basin diversion of Uinta Basin water to the Wasatch Front. The Wasatch Front is the most populous area of Utah and includes Provo and Salt Lake City. The project mitigated for the trans-basin diversion by creating the Uinta and Upalco Units. These units would have provided new storage in the Uinta Basin—on the Uinta and Lake Fork Rivers respectively.

For a variety of reasons, the Uinta and Upalco Units were never constructed. Section 203 (a) of the Central Utah Project Completion Act authorized funding for UBRP—a project intended to provide similar benefits, in some measure, to those that were promised by the units that were not constructed. Originally, the UBRP project planned under the authority of Section 203 (a) was to serve both Indian and non-Indian needs using Indian and non-Indian water. Although planning continued for several years, the Tribe withdrew its support at the eleventh hour—as contracts were being executed. The departure of the Tribe made a reformulation of the plan necessary. Eventually, a scaled-down version was developed. The scaled-down project intentionally avoided interference with tribal water rights, lands, and interests.

The Central Utah Water Conservancy District (District) is the sponsor and entity responsible for repayment of the federal obligation associated with the Bonneville Unit of the CUP and UBRP.

== Stages ==
Each stage in the Uinta Basin water development brought with it new water facilities. Each stage served a different bundle of water right interests and a different set of constituents. The result is a complex layering of economic interests, water rights, land ownership, management objectives, and politics.

Perhaps nowhere in the Basin is this layering and the accompanying actual and potential conflict more focused than the Lake Fork River. The river begins in the High Uintas Wilderness area and feeds thirteen small, high-elevation lakes-turned-reservoirs (High Mountain Lakes). It then provides early-priority Tribe flow rights though a portion of the UIIP, feeds Reclamation's Moon Lake Project (serving non-Indian irrigators), and provides additional irrigation water by exchange with Starvation Reservoir (a CUP feature). Because it diverts Lake Fork River water, integrating UBRP into this already complex and contentious water environment was difficult and problematic.

The Feasibility Study and Environmental Assessment for UBRP were published in 2001. As a partial replacement for the Uinta and Upalco Units, UBRP is intended to serve the following purposes: stabilizing the aging and unsafe High Mountain Lakes on the Lake Fork River drainage and restoring ecological values compatible with the High Uintas Wilderness; providing replacement water for the late season irrigation water stored in the High Mountain Lakes; providing 3,000 acre-feet (3,700,000 m^{3}) of water per year to Roosevelt City for municipal and industrial (M&I) purposes; providing 2,500 acre-feet (3,100,000 m^{3}) of water per year to Lake Fork River irrigators; facilitating improved water resources management and water conservation in the Uinta Basin by increasing water efficiency, enhancing beneficial use, and developing water storage; and enhancing environmental, fish, wildlife, and recreation resources.

The project purposes are to be accomplished by construction (or upgrade) of the following facilities.

- High Mountain Lakes — The stabilization of the thirteen High Mountain Lakes will eliminate the reservoir storage and will return the lakes to their natural levels. As a result, flows originating in the High Mountain Lakes’ watersheds will return to natural hydraulic runoff patterns and thereby restore fishery and recreational resources in the High Mountain Lakes. In addition, the wilderness impacts associated with operation and maintenance of the High Mountain Lakes will be eliminated.
- Big Sand Wash Diversion and Feeder Pipeline — Construction of the Big Sand Wash Diversion and Feeder Pipeline has been completed. The Diversion diverts flows from the Lake Fork River into the Feeder Pipeline. The Feeder Pipeline transports the water to Big Sand Wash Reservoir—an existing off-stream reservoir that is being enlarged as part of the project.
- Enlarged Big Sand Wash Reservoir — The enlargement of the Big Sand Wash Reservoir (by raising the level of the dam and associated dikes and saddle dams) will provide additional water storage capacity and regulation capability. The enlarged reservoir will allow for the storage of water that had been stored in the High Mountain Lakes. This transfer also results in improved instream flow in certain reaches of the Lake Fork River and its principal tributary—the Yellowstone River. The water stored in the enlarged reservoir will serve irrigation and M&I purposes. Increasing the height of the new dam is being accomplished by removing about two-thirds of the downstream side of the old dam, excavating a new keyway immediately downstream of the remaining structure, constructing the new dam, and integrating the remnants of the old dam into the upstream fill of the new, taller structure.
- Big Sand Wash – Roosevelt Pipeline — The Big Sand Wash – Roosevelt Pipeline will deliver project M&I water to Roosevelt, Utah as well as project irrigation water to the lower portions of Lake Fork drainage systems.

== External references ==
Media related to Uintah Basin at Wikimedia Commons
