= Strawberry Reservoir =

Reservoir in Wasatch County, Utah, U.S.

- Location within Utah Location within the United States
- Location: Uintah and Ouray Indian Reservation; Wasatch County, Utah, U.S.
- Coordinates: 40°10′28″N 111°07′36″W
- Type: Reservoir
- Basin countries: United States
- Built: 1972
- Max. length: 10.6 miles (17.1 km)
- Surface area: 17,164 acres (6,946 ha)
- Average depth: 200 feet (61 m)
- Max. depth: 200 ft (61 m)
- Water volume: 1,106,500 acre⋅ft (1.3648 km^{3})
- Surface elevation: 7,612 ft (2,320 m)
- Website: www.recreation.gov/camping/campgrounds/231932

Strawberry Reservoir is a large reservoir in the U.S. state of Utah, located on the Strawberry River. It is Utah's most popular fishery, receiving over 1.5 million angling hours annually and is part of the Blue Ribbon Fisheries program. Game fish in the reservoir include sterilized rainbow trout, bear lake cutthroat trout, kokanee salmon and crayfish. It is located 23 miles (37 km) southeast of Heber, Utah on U.S. Route 40. The reservoir is situated in Strawberry Valley. This valley is normally part of the Colorado River drainage. The dam was constructed to divert water into Utah Valley.

Strawberry Reservoir was the 2006 recipient of the American Fisheries Society's outstanding sport fish development/restoration Project of the Year award.

== Soldier Creek Dam ==
Soldier Creek Dam is an earthen dam, 272 feet (83 m) tall and 1,290 feet (390 m) long at its crest, completed in 1972 as an irrigation project of the United States Bureau of Reclamation, a major element of the extensive Central Utah Project. The original Strawberry Dam was constructed by the Bureau in 1913, about eight miles upstream of the current location, then deliberately breached in 1985. The 1972 Soldier Creek Dam expanded the capacity of Strawberry Reservoir from 283,000 acre⋅ft (349,000,000 m^{3}) to a maximum capacity of 1,106,500 acre⋅ft (1.3648×10^{9} m^{3}) and a total surface area of some 17,164 acres (6,946 ha).

== History ==
Strawberry Reservoir was poisoned with a rotenone treatment (chemically treated) in 1990 to kill all aquatic life in the lake in attempt to get rid of perceived trash fish, specifically the Utah chub. Shortly after replanting the fish, Utah Chub began to appear. The DWR (Division of Wildlife Resources) found that the Bonneville Cutthroat trout (Bear Lake Strain) was a very aggressive chub-eating fish. The DWR has used the Cutthroat trout to keep the number of Chub down in the lake. The fishing and angling regulations for Strawberry are very strict regarding the possession, release and quantity of Native Cutthroat an angler is allowed to keep.

As of 2008 all Cutthroat between 15 inches (380 mm) to 22 inches (560 mm) in length are required to be released back into the water, regardless of the health of the fish. However, anglers are continually encouraged to voluntarily release all cutthroat trout, regardless of size. Additionally, the 2021 DWR regulations for the waterbody indicate that "Any trout with cutthroat characteristics (not necessarily jaw slashing) is considered to be a cutthroat trout."

Kokanee salmon were first introduced to Strawberry Reservoir in 1937 from eggs received from the state of Idaho, specifically from Pend Oreille Lake. Strawberry proved to be excellent areas for kokanee, and they have been re-stocked and re-introduced after every rotenone treatment that Strawberry has seen.

Clearing of the banks of the reservoir's major tributary, the Strawberry River, over the course of the 20th century for grazing purposes has caused naturally occurring phosphorus to become washed into the river and deposited in levels unhealthy to wildlife in the reservoir. An extensive restoration program to re-plant grasses and trees along the banks of the entire river was expected to be completed in 2010. However, the project did not reach completion until 2019. The USFS will continue to monitor the area for weeds and weed treatments will continue, as needed. To improve sage grouse nesting and brood-rearing habitats, these areas will be accessed and treatments will be proposed where appropriate. Grazing will still be allowed where it is currently in place.

== Climate ==
Strawberry Divide is a nearby weather station.

Climate data for Strawberry Divide, Utah, 2004–2020 normals: 8123ft (2476m)
Month	Jan	Feb	Mar	Apr	May	Jun	Jul	Aug	Sep	Oct	Nov	Dec	Year
Mean daily maximum °F (°C)	33.6 (0.9)	34.8 (1.6)	42.8 (6.0)	48.2 (9.0)	56.5 (13.6)	67.5 (19.7)	74.9 (23.8)	72.8 (22.7)	64.9 (18.3)	51.9 (11.1)	41.9 (5.5)	32.2 (0.1)	51.8 (11.0)
Daily mean °F (°C)	25.6 (−3.6)	26.7 (−2.9)	33.7 (0.9)	38.7 (3.7)	46.7 (8.2)	56.1 (13.4)	63.4 (17.4)	61.4 (16.3)	54.0 (12.2)	43.1 (6.2)	33.9 (1.1)	24.8 (−4.0)	42.3 (5.7)
Mean daily minimum °F (°C)	17.7 (−7.9)	18.6 (−7.4)	24.6 (−4.1)	29.1 (−1.6)	37.0 (2.8)	44.7 (7.1)	51.9 (11.1)	50.1 (10.1)	43.2 (6.2)	34.2 (1.2)	25.8 (−3.4)	17.4 (−8.1)	32.9 (0.5)
Average precipitation inches (mm)	3.69 (94)	3.33 (85)	2.61 (66)	2.37 (60)	1.94 (49)	1.22 (31)	1.11 (28)	1.61 (41)	1.99 (51)	2.41 (61)	2.68 (68)	3.51 (89)	28.47 (723)
Source 1: XMACIS2
Source 2: NOAA (Precipitation)

== Major fishing areas ==
Strawberry Reservoir contains four major fishing areas. The largest, at 64 percent of the reservoir's volume, is the Strawberry Basin, which includes the original 8,400-acre (34 km^{2}) Reservoir. The Meadows, located at the southern end of the reservoir south of the Indian Creek Dike, fills a valley of the lower Indian Creek Drainage. Soldier Creek Basin, the deepest fishing area, includes the old Soldier Creek Reservoir, and contains Stinking Springs and Soldier Creek Bay. The Narrows lies between Strawberry and Soldier Creek and includes the drainage channels of the Strawberry River and Indian Creek.

== Aquatic life ==
- Bonneville cutthroat trout (Bear Lake Strain) - Oncorhynchus clarki utah
- Rainbow trout - Oncorhynchus mykiss
- Kokanee salmon - Oncorhynchus nerka
- Crayfish (commonly called Crawdads)
- Utah chub - Gila atraria
