= Strawberry Valley Project =

United States federal reclamation project in Utah

The Strawberry Valley Project was an early project planned and constructed by the Reclamation Service in the Uinta Basin of Utah. Reclamation approved the project in 1905, and in 1908 the project became the first for the Service to generate hydropower. The project is also notable for its interbasin transfer of water, from the Uinta Basin in the Colorado River major watershed to the Bonneville Basin in the Great Basin major watershed, accomplished through the four-mile long Strawberry Tunnel.

== History ==
In 1879, Mormon settlers in the town of Daniel began constructing a diversion from the headwaters of the Strawberry River over the ridge, marking a precursor to the Strawberry Valley Project, despite having no legal right to the water. The Reclamation Service began drafting plans in 1903 for a reservoir on the Strawberry River that would transfer water to Utah County. Anticipating that the Uintah and Ouray Reservation would be allotted soon, Reclamation successfully lobbied to have land set apart for the reservoir when the reservation was opened. The reservation was allotted in 1905, and the Strawberry Valley Project gained approval later that same year, with construction beginning in 1906. In 1910, Congress forced a sale of project lands, reimbursing $1.25 an acre for 56,858.51 acres.

Completed in 1922, the project delivered irrigation water to 25,000 acres of land. Agriculture in southern Utah Valley, as a result of the transfer of water, developed considerably, particularly with regard to sugar beets. The Strawberry Valley Project would go on to form the basis for the Bonneville Unit, authorized in 1968, of the Central Utah Project.

Strawberry Dam is constructed of earthen fill, and the reservoir has a capacity of 298,000 acre-feet.
