= Steinaker State Park =

State park in Uintah County, Utah, United States

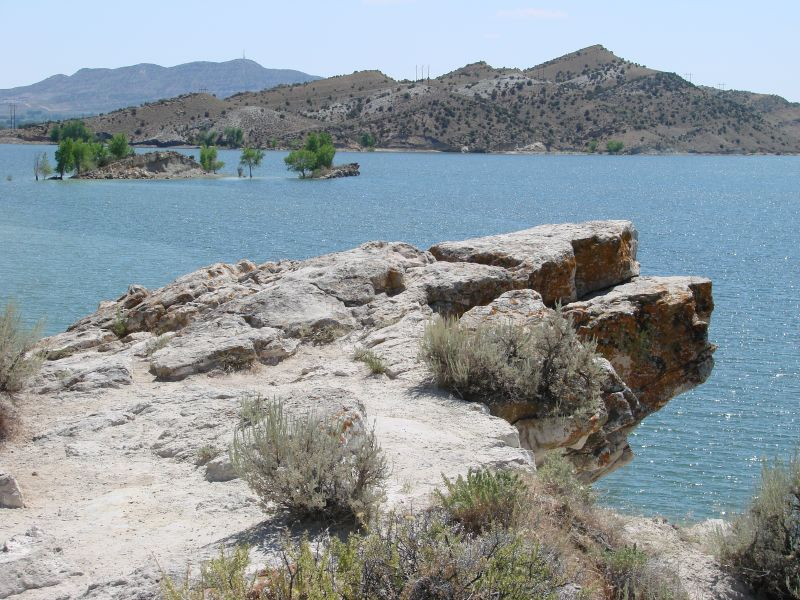
- Steinaker Dam and Reservoir

- Location within Utah Location within the United States
- Interactive map of Steinaker State Park
- Location: Uintah County, Utah, United States
- Coordinates: 40°31′3″N 109°31′49″W
- Area: 2,283 acres (924 ha)
- Elevation: 5,500 ft (1,700 m)
- Opened: 1964
- Operator: Utah State Parks
- Visitors: 74,779 (in 2025)
- Website: Official website

Steinaker State Park is a state park and reservoir in Uintah County, Utah, United States, located 7 miles (11 km) north of Vernal.

Steinaker State Park opened to the public in 1964. It lies at an elevation of 5,500 feet (1,700 m) in northeastern Utah, south of the Uinta Mountains. The climate is arid with hot summers and cold winters. Plant life at the park includes juniper, cacti, and sagebrush. Wildlife includes badgers, bobcats, coyotes, deer, and rabbits. Birds include golden eagles, hawks, bluebirds, vultures, owls, and osprey.

Steinaker State Park is named for John Steinaker, a member of a pioneer family of the region.

== Park facilities ==
Steinaker is popular for swimming, fishing, boating, and waterskiing. Year-round park facilities include a sand beach, boat launching ramp, restrooms, 31 RV campsites, two group-use pavilions, and sewage disposal, and fish cleaning stations.

== Steinaker Dam ==
Steinaker Dam (40°30′12″N 109°33′10″W) is a 162-foot-high (49 m), 1,997-foot-long (609 m) earthfill dam. The reservoir is fed by Ashley Creek and is part of the CUP-Vernal Unit project. It was constructed between 1959 and 1962.
