= Fred Hayes State Park at Starvation =

State park in Duchesne County, Utah, United States

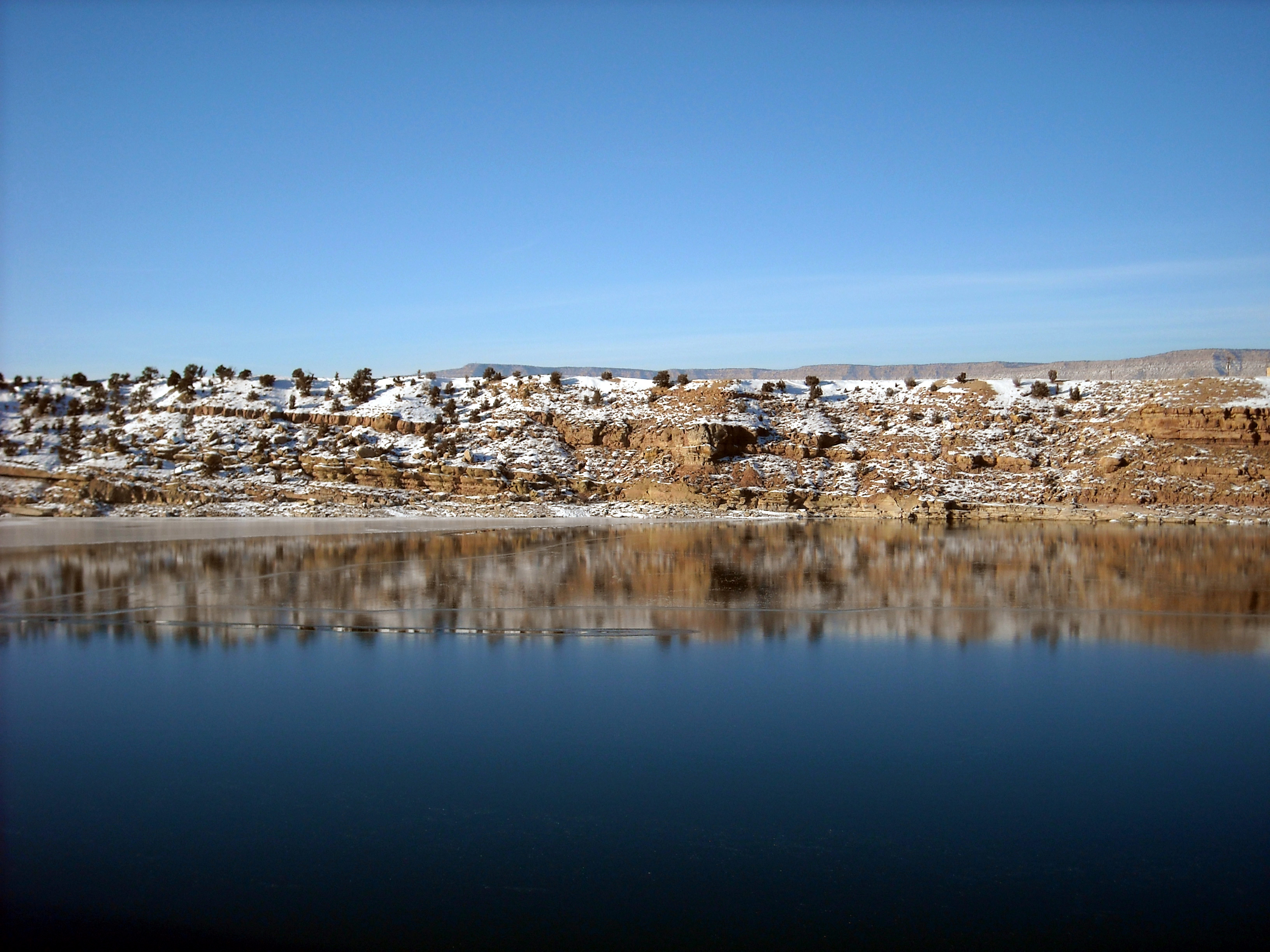

- Location within Utah Location within the United States
- Interactive map of Fred Hayes State Park at Starvation
- Location: Duchesne County, Utah, United States
- Coordinates: 40°12′10″N 110°26′50″W
- Area: 3,500 acres (1,400 ha)
- Elevation: 5,900 ft (1,800 m)
- Opened: 1972
- Operator: Utah State Parks
- Visitors: 150,908 (in 2025)
- Website: Official website
- Utah State Parks

Fred Hayes State Park at Starvation (formerly Starvation State Park) is a state park in Duchesne County, Utah, United States, featuring the 3,495-acre (1,414 ha) Starvation Reservoir. The park is 4 miles (6.4 km) northwest of the city of Duchesne.

== Facilities ==
The 3,500-acre (1,400 ha) Starvation Reservoir is open year-round, and is popular for fishing and boating. It lies at an elevation of 5,712 feet (1,741 m). Established in 1972, the marina features a 54-unit RV campground along with developed and primitive camping, rental cabins, boat ramp and dock, a sand beach, restrooms, showers, a group-use pavilion, sewage disposal, and fish cleaning stations. Primitive camping is allowed in designated areas around the perimeter of the reservoir for a fee. OHVs are only allowed at Knight Hollow Campground. County-owned dirt roads are open (including the road from Knight Hollow to the town of Duchesne) in the nearby area.

== History ==
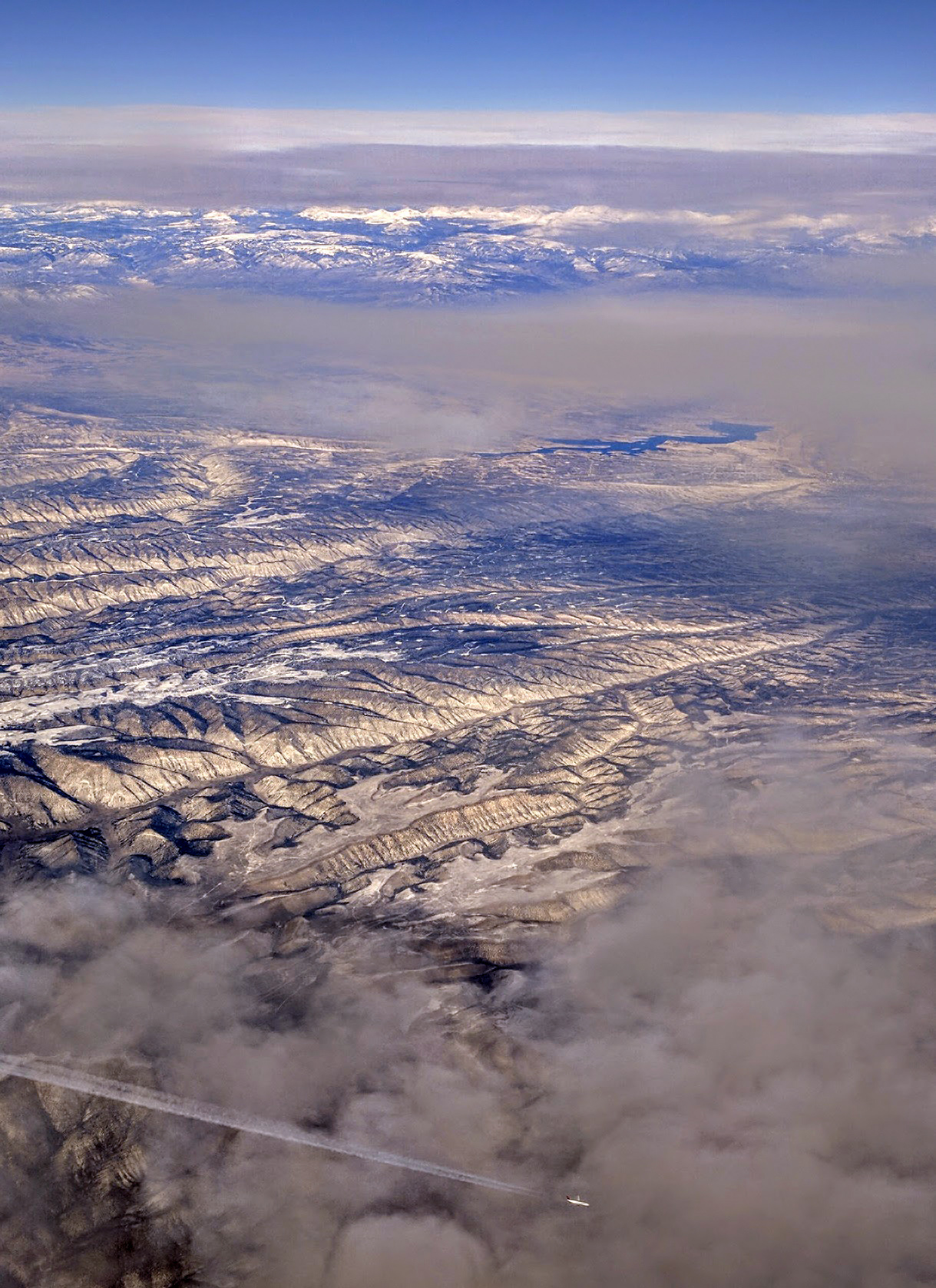
Aerial view of the region south of the park, with Starvation Reservoir visible near the top, November 2017. Oil and oil shale drilling platforms dot the landscape.

There are various narratives explaining the name "Starvation". Orson Mott recounted the most credible story. In 1900, A.M. Murdock of Heber city, approached Major Myton of the Uintah Indian reservation to purchase grazing permits for his cattle. He was given grazing permits in the upper Strawberry river area. Dave Murdock, brother of Al Murdock, had secured a contract to provide beef to the Ute tribe at Fort Duchesne. In the fall of 1904 they brought the herd out of the high grazing areas and made it to the river bottoms which is now covered by Starvation reservoir. Very heavy snows stranded the herd. With no feed the entire herd died. Dave Murdock named the area "Starvation Flats" from this experience.

Another account describes a group of fur trappers stranded in harsh winter conditions who survived by stealing a local Native American cache of food, which resulted in their starvation. Another account tells the opposite story, with the Indians doing the stealing and the trappers starving. A third story involves a local rancher who attempted to graze livestock in the area, and they all starved. Yet another explanation for the name involves settlers in the early 1900s trying to survive along the banks of the Strawberry River, in the area now occupied by the reservoir. These settlers dealt with near-starvation in a hostile environment. Winters in the area are long and cold, and their livestock often died. The area's short growing season was hindered by floods, hail, early frost and other problems. These settlers could have nicknamed the area Starvation.

In 2019 the park (which had previously been named the Starvation State Park) was officially renamed the Fred Hayes State Park at Starvation. Hayes had been the director of the Utah Division of Parks and Recreation (now known as the Utah Division of State Parks) from 2012 until he died unexpectedly in early March 2018.

== Fishing ==
Encompassing nearly 3,500 surface acres, the reservoir is part of Fred Hayes State Park at Starvation and is known for its scenic high-desert landscape and diverse fishery. Anglers are drawn to its waters for a chance to catch a variety of species, including walleye, smallmouth bass, rainbow trout, and brown trout. Starvation Reservoir is especially renowned for its trophy walleye and hosts multiple fishing tournaments throughout the year. The reservoir’s clear waters and relatively low fishing pressure make it a favored spot for both casual anglers and seasoned sportsmen. State biologists stocked kokanee salmon at Starvation Reservoir in 2016, as an experiment to see if it would be possible to establish a population of the landlocked salmon at the lake. These efforts proved unsuccessful, and the efforts with kokanee were abandoned in 2025.

== Starvation Dam ==
The Starvation Dam (40°11′25″N 110°26′38″W) is a 210-foot-high (64 m), 3,070-foot-long (940 m) earthfill dam. The reservoir is fed by the Strawberry River in the Uinta Basin, and is part of the Central Utah Project – Bonneville Unit. It was constructed in 1970.

== See also ==
- List of Utah State Parks
