= Red Fleet State Park =

State park in Utah, United States

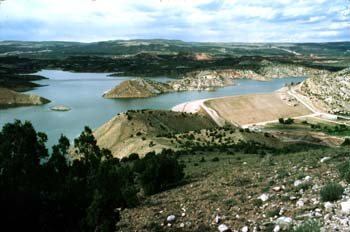

- Location within Utah Location within the United States
- Interactive map of Red Fleet State Park
- Location: Uintah County, Utah, United States
- Coordinates: 40°34′56″N 109°25′56″W
- Area: 1,963 acres (794 ha)
- Elevation: 5,500 ft (1,700 m)
- Opened: 1988
- Operator: Utah State Parks
- Visitors: 45,583 (in 2025)
- Website: Official website
- Utah State Parks

Red Fleet State Park is a state park of Utah, United States, featuring a 750-acre (300 ha) reservoir and a fossil trackway of dinosaur footprints. The park is located 10 miles (16 km) north of Vernal.

== Features ==
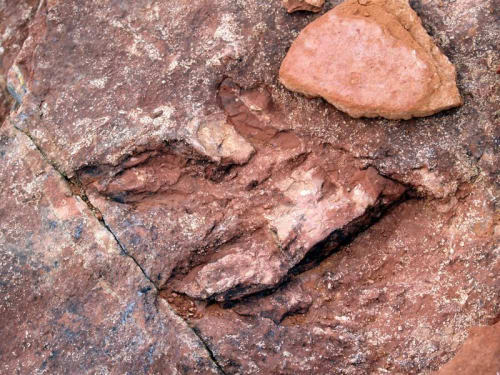
Probable Dilophosaurus footprint on the trackway

Red Fleet State Park lies at an elevation of 5,500 feet (1,700 m) in northeastern Utah, immediately south of the Uinta Mountains. The climate is arid, with hot summers and cold winters. Surrounded by red slick rock formations, the park got its name from three large Navajo sandstone outcrops that look like a fleet of ships as they jut up from the reservoir.

Plant life at the park includes juniper, various cacti, and sagebrush.

Wildlife includes badgers, bobcat, coyote, deer, and rabbit. Birds include golden eagles, hawks, bluebirds, vultures, owls, and osprey.

== Facilities ==
Year-round park facilities include a sand beach, boat launching ramp, restrooms, RV campsites, a picnic area, sewage disposal, and fish cleaning stations. Recently a dinosaur trackway dating back 200 million years was discovered in the area.

== Red Fleet Dam ==
The Red Fleet Dam is a 161-foot-high (49 m), 1,670-foot-long (510 m) earthfill dam. The reservoir is fed by Big Bush Creek and is part of the CUP-Jensen Unit project. It was constructed in 1980.
