= Strawberry River (Utah) =

Coordinates: 40°09′42″N 110°23′19″W

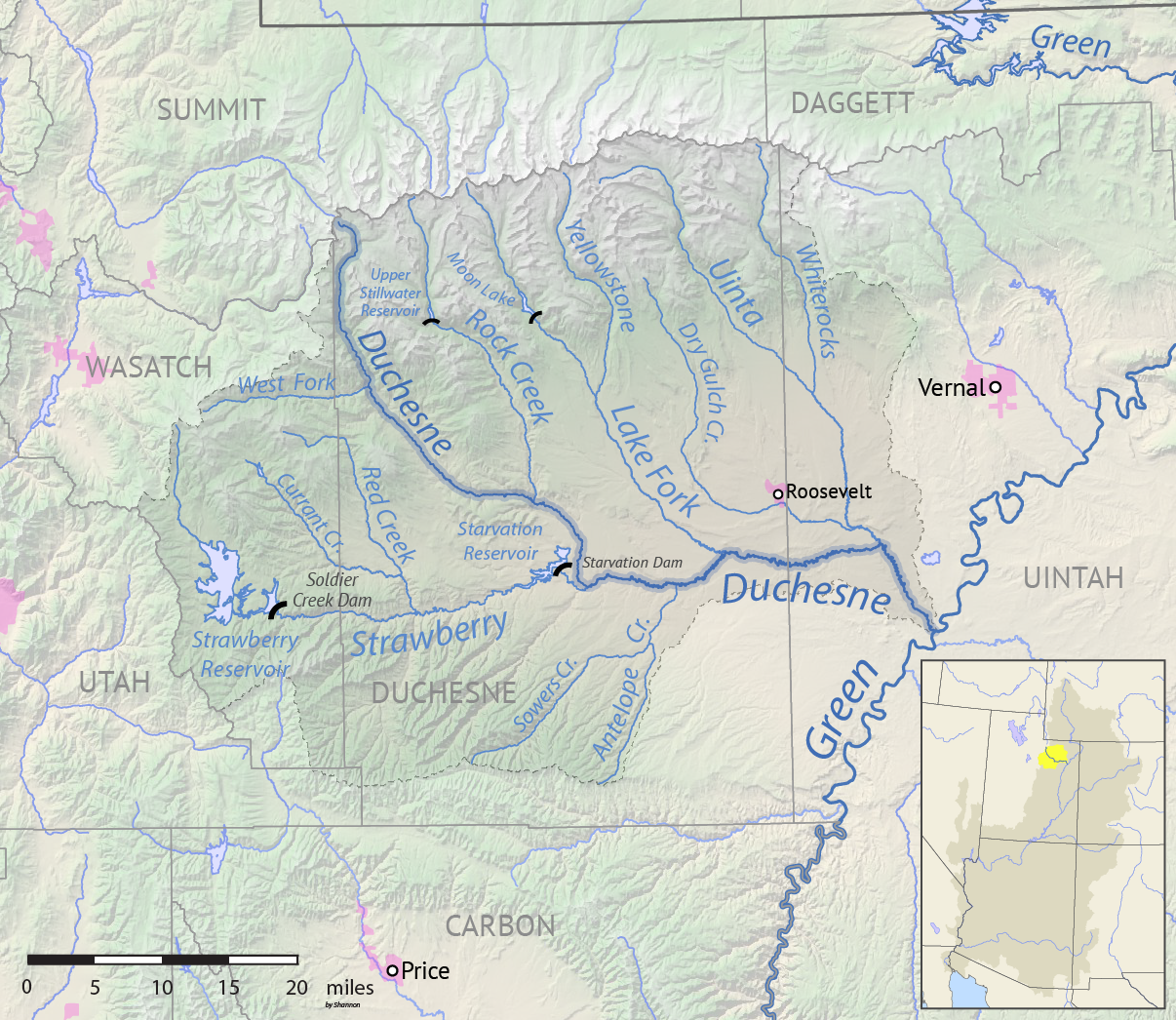
Map of the Duchesne drainage basin, with the Strawberry River at left

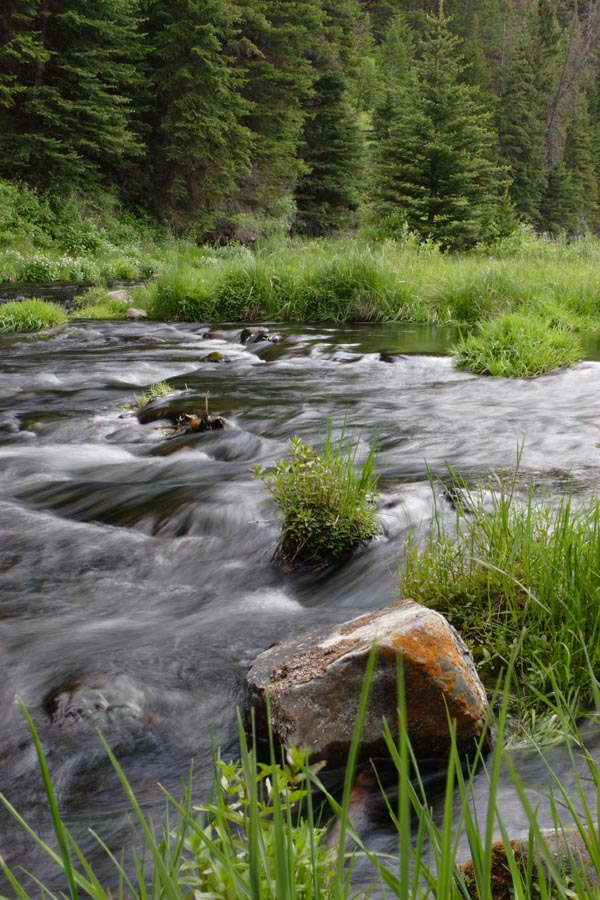
The Strawberry River below Soldier Creek Dam

The Strawberry River is an 18-mile (29 km) river located in eastern Utah, United States.

== Description ==
Strawberry River's headwaters is located in the Wasatch Mountains of the western Uintah Basin. The river flows south into Strawberry Reservoir, then through Soldier Creek Dam.

The first 8 miles (13 km) below Soldier Creek Dam is owned by the U.S. Bureau of Reclamation, and is one of Utah's most productive brown and cutthroat trout fisheries, and was one of the first waters in Utah to be designated a Quality Fishing Stream. This part of the river can only be accessed by a trail that runs along the north bank. No motorized vehicles are allowed. 12 miles (19 km) below Soldier Creek Dam, the river runs by the Strawberry Pinnacles (sedimentary formations), where it is joined by the tributaries Avintaquin Creek and Red Creek. The narrow canyon the river runs through is characterized by high cliffs and dense foliage.

The river is impounded in the Starvation Reservoir within the Fred Hayes State Park at Starvation. After exiting the reservoir the stream joins the Duchesne River east of the town of Duchesne.

During extremely cold winters, areas of the river have frozen solid, causing the river to overflow its banks and flood the canyon floor. This happened in 1983 and 2000.

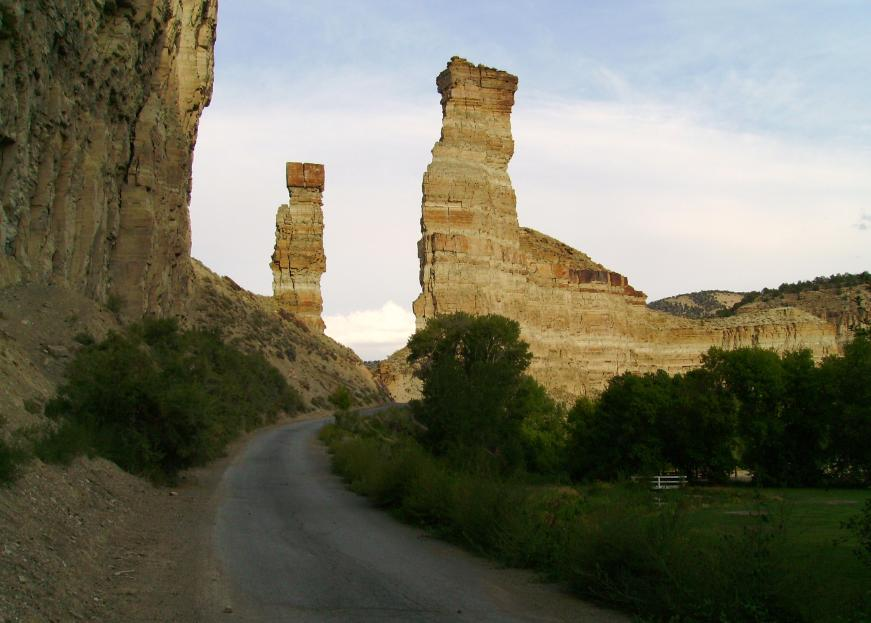
Strawberry Pinnacles

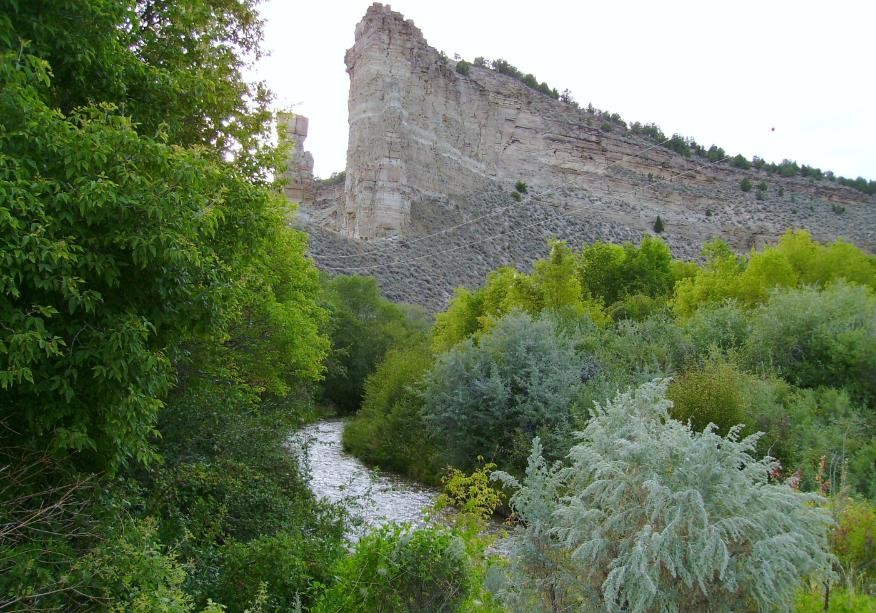
River North of Pinnacles

== See also ==
- List of rivers of Utah
